= William Douglas (British Army officer, born 1858) =

British Army general

Major-General Sir William Douglas KCMG CB DSO
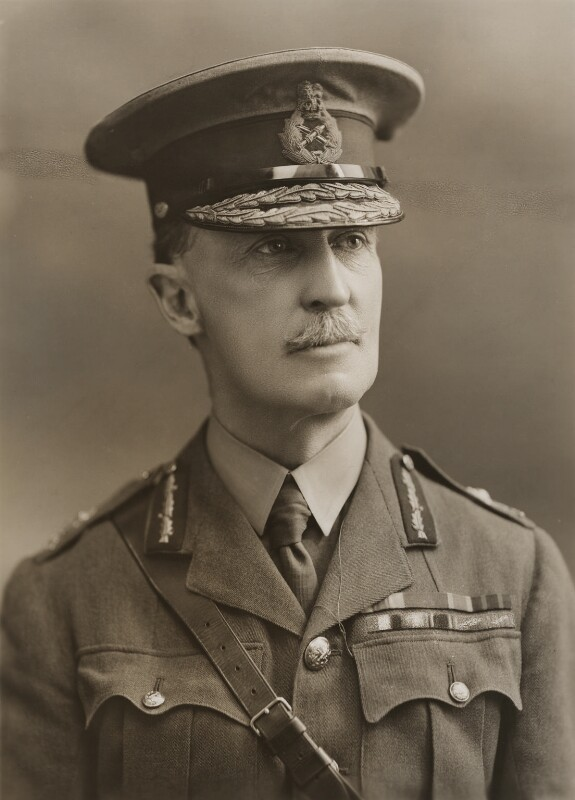
- Douglas in 1917
- Born: 13 August 1858
- Died: 2 November 1920 (aged 62)
- Relatives: General Sir Charles Douglas
- Military career
- Allegiance: United Kingdom
- Branch: British Army
- Rank: Major-General
- Unit: Royal Scots
- Commands: 14th Infantry Brigade; East Lancashire Division
- Conflicts: Bechuanaland Expedition; Second Boer War; First World War
- Awards: Knight Commander of the Order of St Michael and St George; Companion of the Order of the Bath; Distinguished Service Order

Major-General Sir William Douglas, KCMG, CB, DSO (13 August 1858 – 2 November 1920) was a British Army officer.

== Military career ==
Douglas was commissioned into the Royal Scots on 30 January 1878.

He succeeded Lieutenant Edward Altham as adjutant on 24 March 1880 and saw action in the Bechuanaland Expedition in 1884, and after attending the Staff College at Camberley from 1896 to 1897, saw action again in the Second Boer War for which he was appointed a Companion of the Distinguished Service Order (DSO).

He was promoted to brevet colonel in February 1904 and was placed on half-pay in December 1904 He later became a staff officer with Irish Command in March 1906 and was appointed a Companion of the Order of the Bath in June 1908.

After having served as a GSO1 of the 6th Division, he was promoted to temporary brigadier general and became commander of the 14th Infantry Brigade in November 1909, taking over from Major General Alexander Thorneycroft.

Promoted to major general in August 1912, he was made general officer commanding (GOC) East Lancashire Division, a Territorial Force formation, in May 1913.

He deployed with his division to Egypt in September 1914, in the opening weeks of the First World War, and commanded it during the Gallipoli campaign in 1915 and for which he was later appointed a Knight Commander of the Order of St Michael and St George. He went on to command the division, numbered the 42nd in 1915, in the Middle Eastern theatre, most notably in the Gallipoli campaign from 1915-1916, before giving up command of the 42nd Division and returning to England in March 1917. He then commanded the Western Reserve Centre.

He retired from the army on 19 August 1919 and died on 2 November 1920.

== Family ==
Douglas married, in December 1885, Ellen Lytcott (a Lady of Grace of St John of Jerusalem), daughter of Samuel Taylor, Crown Solicitor, Barbados.

Military offices
Preceded by Cecil Park	GOC East Lancashire Division; 1913–1917	Succeeded by Bertram Mitford
