= 51st (Westmorland and Cumberland) Field Regiment, Royal Artillery =

51st (Westmorland & Cumberland) Field Regiment, RA 251 (Westmorland & Cumberland Yeomanry) Field Regiment, RA
- Royal Artillery cap badge
- Active: 1920–1961
- Country: United Kingdom
- Branch: Territorial Army
- Role: Field artillery Special operations infantry
- Size: 2–4 Batteries; 1 Chindit column
- Part of: 42nd (East Lancashire) Division; 16th Brigade
- Garrison/HQ: Penrith, Cumbria; Carlisle, Cumbria
- Engagements: Norwegian campaign Battle of Bardia; Siege of Tobruk; Operation Crusader; Second Chindit Expedition

The 51st (Westmorland & Cumberland) Field Regiment, was a Royal Artillery unit of Britain's part-time Territorial Army (TA) formed after World War I from a Yeomanry Cavalry regiment recruited in Cumbria. One of its batteries served in the Norwegian campaign at the beginning of World War II. The regiment then sailed to the Middle East and took part in the Western Desert campaign, including the Siege of Tobruk and Operation Crusader. It was next transferred to Ceylon and later formed a Chindit column in the Burma Campaign. The regiment continued in the postwar TA until 1961.

== Origin ==
The Westmorland and Cumberland Yeomanry (Note: Although many sources use the spelling 'Westmoreland', the Monthly Army List used 'Westmorland' throughout the 20th Century, as preferred by the people of Cumbria.) (WCY) was a cavalry unit of the Territorial Force (TF), which had served in World War I. Before the TF reformed on 7 February 1920 the War Office had decided that only a small number of mounted Yeomanry regiments would be required in future, and the remainder would have to be re-roled, mainly as artillery. Only the 14 senior Yeomanry regiments were retained as horsed cavalry. (Note: Two regiments of Scouts also remained mounted; of the remainder of the Yeomanry regiments 1 became a mounted signals unit, 8 became armoured car companies, and the remainder (27) transferred to the Royal Artillery.) The WCY, 17th in the order of precedence, therefore converted to the Royal Field Artillery (RFA) as 2nd (Cumberland Yeomanry) Army Brigade (Note: In the Royal Artillery prior to 1938 a brigade was a lieutenant-colonel's command consisting of independent batteries 'brigaded' together; it was not comparable with an infantry or cavalry brigade commanded by a brigadier-general. In the Territorials, unlike the Regulars, unit heritage is carried by the brigade/regiment, rather than the battery.) with two batteries and headquarters (HQ) at Penrith. When the TF was reorganised as the Territorial Army in 1921 these were numbered as:

93rd (Westmorland & Cumberland Yeomanry) Army Brigade, RFA

- Brigade HQ at Drill Hall, Penrith
- 369 (Westmorland Yeomanry) Battery
- 370 (Cumberland Yeomanry) Battery

A further reorganisation on 1 June 1923 saw the brigade exchange its number and two Cumberland batteries with 51st (East Lancashire & Cumberland) Brigade, becoming the 51st (Westmorland & Cumberland) Brigade, a four-battery brigade within 42nd (East Lancashire) Division. Before World War I the two Cumberland batteries had constituted the 4th East Lancashire Brigade, Royal Field Artillery (The Cumberland Artillery). (Note: TA divisions were numbered from 42 upwards and their artillery brigades were numbered sequentially, beginning with 51. The 51st (W&C) Brigade was thus the senior field artillery unit of the TA.) Finally, on 1 June 1924 the RFA was subsumed into the RA and its units were termed 'Field Brigades' and 'Field Batteries', giving the following organisation: (Note: From this point the word 'Yeomanry' was dropped from the regimental subtitle until 1953, but not from the two ex-Yeomanry batteries, 369/370. These were always listed ahead of 203/204 because cavalry had higher precedence than artillery.)

51st (Westmorland & Cumberland) Field Brigade, RA

- Brigade HQ at Artillery Drill Hall, Albert Street, Carlisle
- 369 (Westmorland Yeomanry) Field Bty at Artillery Drill Hall, Carlisle
- 370 (Cumberland Yeomanry) Field Bty at Artillery Drill Hall, moving to the Riding School, Carlisle, by 1937
- 203 (Cumberland) Field Bty at Whitehaven
- 204 (Cumberland) Field Bty (Howitzers) at Workington

The establishment of a TA divisional artillery brigade was four 6-gun batteries, three equipped with 18-pounder guns and one with 4.5-inch howitzers, all of World War I patterns. However, the batteries only held four guns in peacetime. The guns and their first-line ammunition wagons were horsedrawn and the battery staffs were mounted. Partial mechanisation was carried out from 1927, but the guns retained iron-tyred wheels until pneumatic tyres began to be introduced just before the outbreak of World War II.

In 1938 the RA modernised its nomenclature and a lieutenant-colonel's command was designated a 'regiment' rather than a 'brigade'; this applied to TA field brigades from 1 November 1938.

The TA was doubled in size after the Munich Crisis, and most regiments formed duplicates. Part of the reorganisation was that field regiments changed from four six-gun batteries to an establishment of two batteries, each of three four-gun troops. For 51st Field Rgt this resulted in:

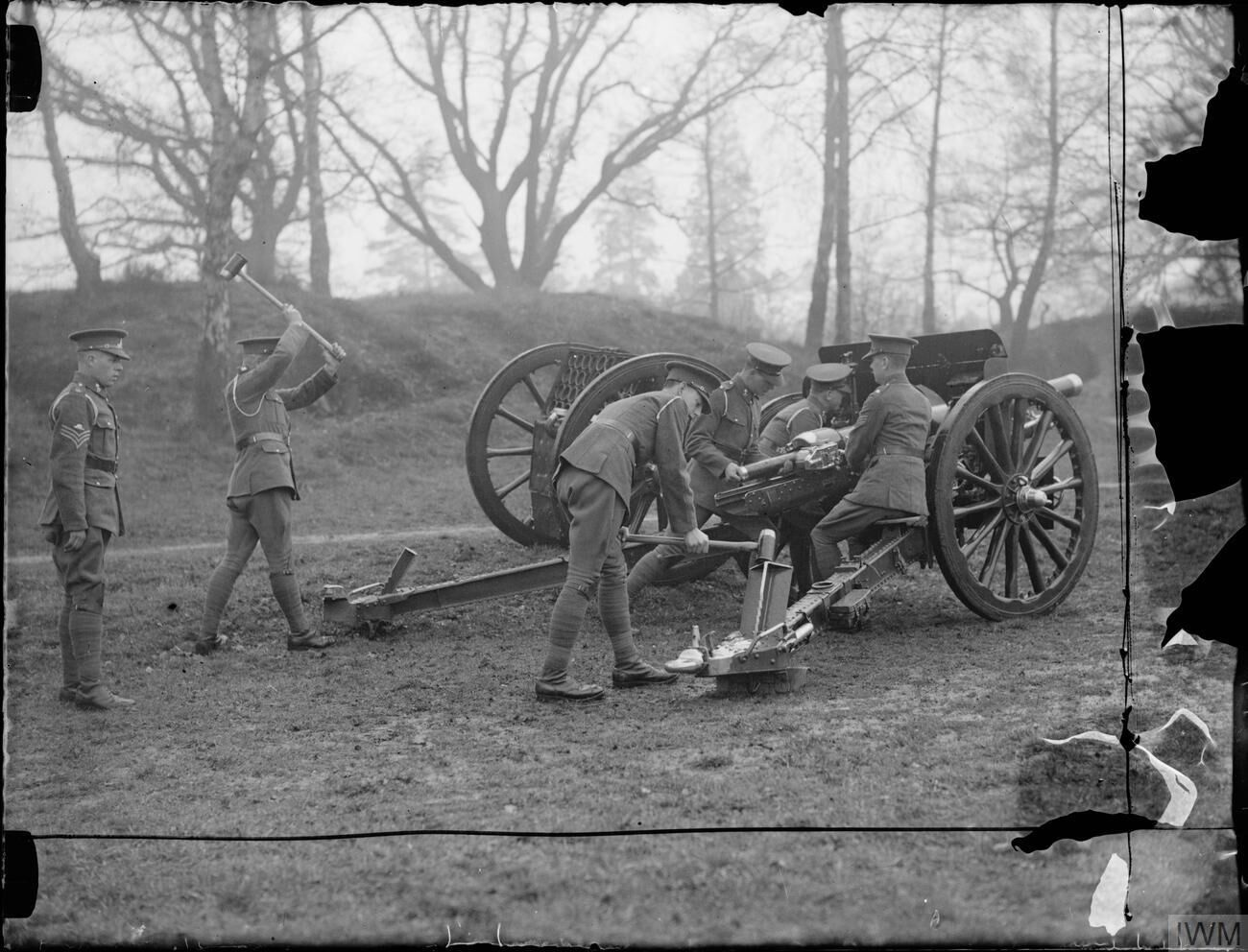
Emplacing an 18-pounder with wooden wheels at the start of World War II

51st (Westmorland & Cumberland) Field Regiment, RA

- Regimental Headquarters (RHQ) at Riding School, Carlisle
- 370 (Cumberland Yeomanry) Field Bty at Riding School, Carlisle
- 203 (Cumberland) Field Bty at Whitehaven

109th Field Regiment, RA

- RHQ at Workington
- 369 (Westmorland Yeomanry) Field Bty at Artillery Drill Hall, Carlisle
- 204 (Cumberland) Field Bty at Workington

== World War II ==
51st (W&C) Field Rgt mobilised with 42nd (East Lancashire) Division on the outbreak of war in September 1939, but left on 10 April 1940, the day before the rest of the division embarked to join the British Expeditionary Force in France.

=== Norway ===
Shortly afterwards 203 Bty, equipped with new Mk II 25-pounder guns, was detached and sent to participate in the Norwegian campaign. It formed part of 'Rupertforce', which sailed from Scapa Flow and began landing at Harstad, north of Narvik, on 15 April. However, it was not until 22 April that the gunners of 203 Bty landed, and another week before the first of their guns arrived on a landing craft. Although a naval bombardment had been tried, movement was greatly hampered by deep snow and no immediate attack was made on the German troops in Narvik. However, at the end of the month a force landed near Håkvik and advanced along the coast road towards Ankenes, from where Narvik could be threatened. Two of 203 Bty's guns were landed on the coast road on 4 May. By 9 May French Chasseurs Alpins had established themselves on the high ground overlooking Narvik and had been joined by another 2-gun section of 203 Bty.

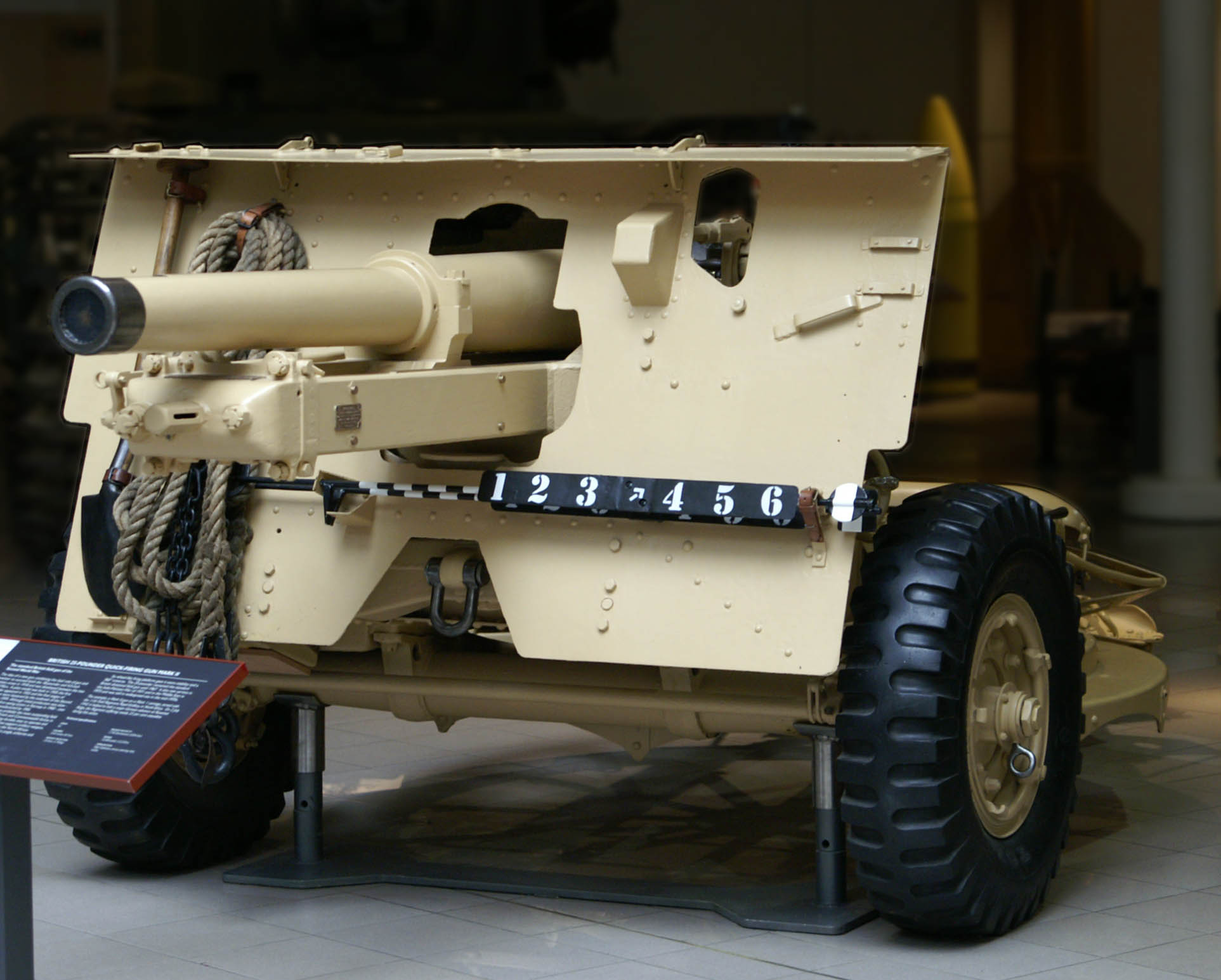
25-Pounder gun howitzer preserved at the Imperial War Museum.

Narvik was attacked by a combined Norwegian, British, French and Polish force on 13 May. The force successfully landed north of the town and began the operation to capture it. By morning on 16 May the British infantry had been withdrawn to reinforce Bodø (see below) leaving only the artillery (including 203 Bty less a troop) supporting the Allied attack on Narvik. The town was captured on 28 May.

Meanwhile, 1st Battalion Scots Guards and a 4-gun Troop of 203 Bty had been sent by sea to Mo i Rana, where they landed on 12 May and took up position at Stein to block German reinforcements approaching from the south. However, their own reinforcements failed to arrive after their troop transport was bombed, and on 17 May the Germans attacked at Stein. The guns were stationed at the rear, but communications along the road from their observers were cut and they could play little part in the action. Supported by a paratroop drop, the Germans pressed on though the short night towards Mo and entered the town at 15.30 o 18 May. The Scots Guards fell back towards Bodø where reinforcements were arriving by small steamships. They took up blocking positions at Krokstrand (21 May) and then Viskikoia (23 May). The field guns could only give limited support because of the loss of their signalling equipment, and the small force was pushed out, but the small force successfully disengaged and got back to Bodø. The exhausted Scots Guards went into reserve and the troop of 203 Bty joined the mixed British–Norwegian force ('Stockforce') defending the approaches at Pothus. Fighting went on throughout 25 May, with both sides using air attacks.

But with the desperate situation that had developed in the Battle of France the government had already decided on 24 May to evacuate the British forces from Norway. On 26 May the British force at Pothus withdrew to Bodø and then withdrew by warship to Borkenes, west of Harstad, where the larger Allied force came from Narvik to await the final evacuation. From 5 to 7 June troopships and smaller steamers embarked men and stores from Hardstad, even bringing away 203 Bty's last six 25-pounders.

The reunited 51st (W&C) Field Rgt joined 46th Division on 30 July 1940 while that formation was refitting in Scottish Command after its return from Dunkirk. The regiment left again on 16 September and embarked for the Middle East.

=== Tobruk ===
By 23 October 51st (W&C) Field Rgt under Lt-Col J.S. Douglas had landed at Suez and went into camp at Beni Yusef camp, just south of the Pyramids, to equip and train for desert warfare. It then moved from Cairo across the Western Desert to Baggush to join 16th British Brigade in Western Desert Force (WDF). By 15 December it was at Sidi Barrani, which 16th Bde had just captured, and then with 16th Bde it reinforced 6th Australian Division for the capture of Bardia. The attack was timed for 05.30 on 3 January 1941, the guns opening fire without previous registration, the targets having been fixed by careful surveying. 51st (W&C) Field Rgt's role was to deal with enemy artillery, and it moved forward three times during the day's fighting to bring enemy batteries under fire. The three-day operation was a major success, almost the entire Italian garrison being killed or captured. Afterwards, 51st (W&C) Field Rgt moved up with 16th Australian Bde for the capture of Tobruk (21–22 January), where it repeated its counter-battery (CB) role. F Troop had two guns hit and several men wounded, but by nightfall on 21 January the regiment was leap-frogging batteries forward with 19th Australian Bde to positions inside the enemy's wire. The port was secured next day with another large 'bag' of prisoners. On 23 January, when it reverted to the command of XIII Corps (as WDF had become), the regiment was some miles south-west of Tobruk, and at the end of the month it had reached Martuba.

XIII Corps had cleared the Italians out of Cyrenaica, but its supply lines were now stretched to their limit, and it had to pause its advance in February. Then the balance shifted: the first troops of the Afrika Korps under Generalleutnant Erwin Rommel began arriving to support the Italians, while British forces had to be diverted to the Greek Campaign. This left Cyrenaica Command in a weak condition. On 28 February at Cyrene 51st (W&C) Field Rgt was ordered to exchange its modern 25-pdrs for the old 18-pdrs and 4.5-inch howitzers of 2/2nd Australian Field Rgt prior to that regiment's departure to Greece.

The Germans began their advance in North Africa on 31 March and soon the British forces in Cyrenaica were being forced back. 51st (W&C) Field Rgt was sent up with 9th Australian Division and by 4 April was fiercely engaged at Tecmis. B Troop of 203 Bty was engaged by German tanks and knocked out three of them suffering a few casualties. 370 Field Bty was with 20th Australian Bde withdrawing to the pass south of Barca. On 6 April 203 Bty withdrew to Gazala, halting to cover 2/48th Australian Battalion, whole B Trp remained as a rearguard. During the night of 9/10 April the regiment entered the Tobruk perimeter. The Germans attacked next morning, met by C and E Trps firing over open sights. E Trp was forced to retire, but C Trp kept firing. They lost two guns, two men killed and 20 wounded. Next day 203 Bty was able to collect 12 25-pounders. German reconnaissance troops probing the defences at Er Regima were 'severely dealt with' by 2/13th Australian Bn and the guns of 51st (W&C) Field Rgt, before the guns were pulled back from the perimeter into Tobruk itself.

Rommel now bypassed Tobruk, leaving it to be besieged while he chased the British back to the Egyptian frontier. 9th Australian Division formed the core of the garrison, but had no artillery of its own. It was supported by HQ Royal Artillery, Tobruk, with five field regiments, including 51st (W&C). The major attack on 13 and 14 April (the 'Easter Battle') was thrown back by the Australian tactics of allowing the enemy tanks through, then destroying their attendant infantry and support units; the unsupported tanks were then destroyed by the few anti-tanks guns and more often by the 25-pounders firing armour-piercing shot. During another failed attack on 16 April Lt-Col Douglas was wounded and command of 51st (W&C) Field Rgt devolved on Major H.M. Ingledew, who handed 307 Bty over to Captain Cavagham, who was himself wounded later that day. Together with Capt Sutcliffe wounded in his observation post (OP), the regiment had lost 10 officers. After these setback the Germans surrounding Tobruk settled down for a formal siege.

During the siege the garrison of Tobruk endured almost constant shelling and bombing, but carried out an aggressive defence. From 29 April to 3 May Rommel tried again to take the port but was beaten back, largely by the artillery. 51st (W&C) Field Rgt's two batteries were supporting the 10 miles (16 km) frontage of 26th Australian Bde, with OPs on the perimeter and a mobile Forward Observation Officer (FOO). It was Capt Clapham in 51st (W&C) Field Rgt's OP that brought down the concentrated fire that defeated the attack on 29 April RHQ was alongside 26th Bde HQ, and 203 Bty was linked to the neighbouring B/O Bty of 1st Regiment Royal Horse Artillery (RHQ); 203 Battery kept two of its 4.5s well forward. Bombardier J. Reardon continued to man and fire his gun single-handed after being wounded; he was later awarded the Military Medal.

The siege continued. Supplies and reinforcements were brought into the port at night by the 'Tobruk Ferry Service' of fast naval vessels. On 31 May Lt-Col P.H.J. Tuck, who had been appointed to the command after the wounding of Lt-Col Douglas, exchanged with Lt-Col A.G. Matthew of 104th (Essex Yeomanry) Rgt, RHA. During August the Tobruk Ferry Service began bringing in replacement units and withdrawing some of those that had been in Tobruk from the first. On 20 August 51st (W&C) Field Rgt was relieved by a Polish Carpathian Artillery Regiment and sailed for Alexandria. However, the regiment was not rested: it was back in the front line with 1st South African Brigade at Mersa Matruh on 27 August.

=== Operation Crusader ===
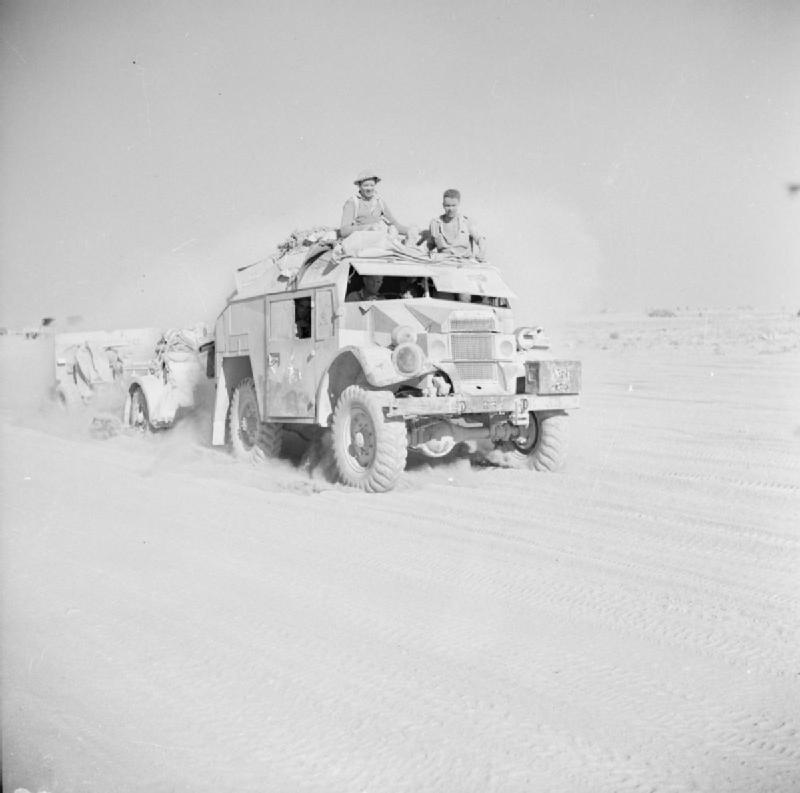
25-pounder and Quad tractor moving up to the front in the Western Desert.

Eighth Army was being formed in the Western Desert to carry out an autumn offensive to relieve Tobruk and drive the Axis out of Cyrenaica: Operation Crusader. Its troops were reinforced and reorganised accordingly. 51st (W&C) Field Rgt left 1st SA Bde on the frontier on 16 September and went back to the Nile Delta to link up with 4th SA Bde. The field artillery now had sufficient 25-pdrs and Quad gun tractors. Since the end of 1940 the RA had been producing enough battery staffs to begin the process of changing regiments from a two-battery to a three-battery organisation. (Three 8-gun batteries were easier to handle, and it meant that each infantry battalion in a brigade could be closely associated with its own battery.) The number 437 had been assigned to 51st (W&C) Field Rgt for its third battery, but the regiment did not finally form it until 16 October 1941.

At the start of 'Crusader', while 4th SA Bde was in army reserve, 203 Bty with 12 guns (still organised as one battery) was assigned to 7th Support Group of 7th Armoured Division, commanded by Brigadier 'Jock' Campbell. Eighth Army began its advance on 18 November and fighting was confused. On 21 November 7th Support Gp was ordered to attack northwards with 7th Armoured Bde from Sidi Rezegh airfield to secure a ridge overlooking the main east–west track and meet the breakout from Tobruk. Just before the attack was due to start, enemy tanks were seen approaching from the rear. While some of the tank units turned to meet this threat, 7th Support Gp's northward attack was partially successful, but casualties were heavy from the Axis artillery on the escarpment further north. The Support Gp's guns also became drawn into the short-range fighting against the Panzers advancing from the south. But at the end of the day the group was holding the vital ground. Next morning the British guns drove off two attacks in some of the bitterest fighting of the whole campaign, but a flank attack at last light forced 7th Support Gp to withdraw, and the artillery pulled out troop by troop after firing at short range on the advancing 21st Panzer Division . The survivors of the Support Gp withdrew behind the South Africans.

Next day (23 November) Rommel turned the Afrika Korps south-east and made a dash for the Egyptian frontier. On the way 15th Panzer Division cut straight through 7th Support Gp's position, scattering its vehicles. One large enemy column was held up by the guns of 203 Bty, commanded by Maj M. St John Oswald, who had only just taken over from Maj H.W.L. Cowan who had been seriously wounded. After several days of intense fighting, 7th Armoured Division was withdrawn to Egypt to refit, leaving 7th Support Gp to break up into small infantry–artillery raiding columns ('Jock columns') to harass the rear of the Afrika Korps. On 27 November these columns spotted 15th Panzer Division returning from its dash to the frontier and the artillery gave the panzers a rough time. This brought on a resumption of the scrappy fighting round Sidi Rezegh, but the garrison of Tobruk had now broken out and was also engaged. On 28 November 203 Bty, down to seven guns, continued fighting with 7th Support Gp to hinder the passage of 15th Panzer.

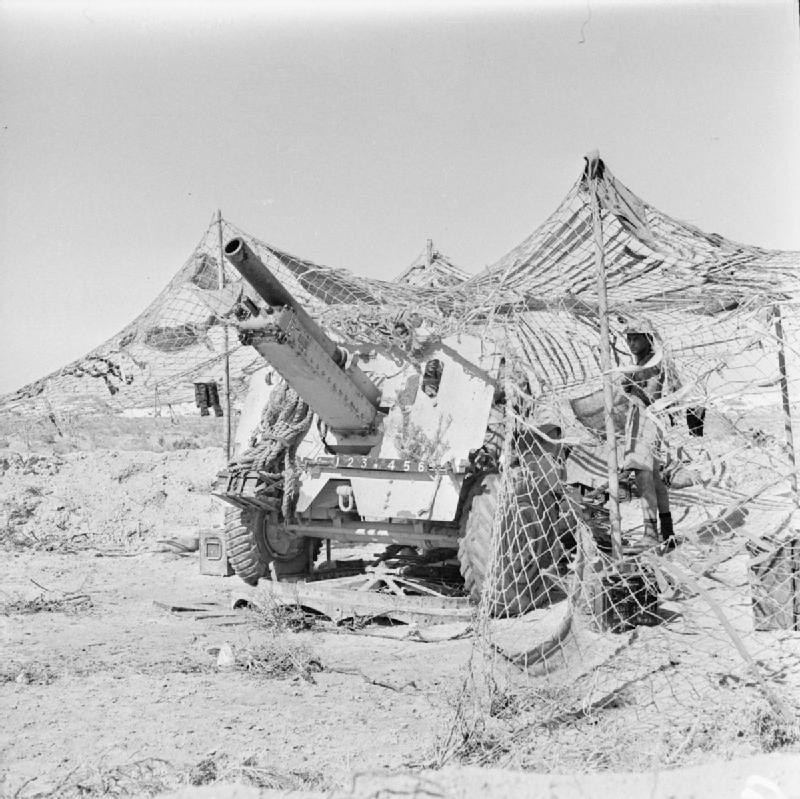
Camouflaged 25-pounder in the Western Desert.

British reinforcements had now arrived, and the rest of 51st (W&C) Field Rgt was operating as an army regiment under Eighth Army HQ. On 3 December it came into action with 11th Indian Bde in a 20 miles (32 km) night march to attack Point 182 south of El Adem airfield, which was carried out 'with exemplary speed' and was partially successful. The fighting continued through December, and by the middle of the month Rommel was forced to retreat westwards. 22nd Guards Brigade Group ('Bencol'), supported by 51st (W&C) Field Rgt, was sent to cut him off south of Benghazi. At Beda Fomm on 22 December the regimental OPs reported a column of 30 tanks and transport approaching. The guns engaged at a range of 1,000 yards (910 m) and A Trp, 370 Bty, continued firing over open sights in a thick mist as the enemy approached. All but one of its Quads was knocked out, but the troop continued firing until it was overrun; three officers and 33 men were posted missing. The enemy column was then counter-attacked by British tanks. Two days later 22nd Guards Bde was sent south towards Agedabia. It formed a column round 370 Bty consisting of a troop each of anti-tank guns and light anti-aircraft guns, two companies of the Coldstream Guards, 3rd Royal Tank Regiment and a squadron of the 11th Hussars. It met the enemy at Agedabia and the guns came into action. Captain White was shelled and then attacked from the air while directing the guns. F Troop engaged a Flak 88 gun and destroyed it. The Germans made an aggressive defence at Agedabia and were able to retire to El Agheila on 1 January 1942, temporarily ending the operations while both sides brought up supplies and reinforcements.

436 Battery was absorbed back into 51st (W&C) Rgt's other batteries on 7 January 1942, possibly because of the losses the regiment had sustained. The two batteries continued to support 200th Guards Bde (the renamed 22nd Guards Bde) as it harassed the enemy during January. The Axis won the supply race and advanced back up the Agedabia road on 21 January, sweeping round 200th Gds Bde. Eighth Army fell back to the Gazala Line, where it dug in to continue its build-up.

=== Ceylon ===
While Eighth Army had been fighting Operation Crusader, the Japanese had attacked Pearl Harbor and Malaya. Reinforcements were desperately needed in India and South East Asia, and Eighth Army was stripped of some of its veteran units. Among the formations selected was 70th Division, including 16th Bde to which 51st (W&C) Field Rgt was assigned once more.

The brigade group set sail on 6 March and arrived in Ceylon on 15 March (the rest of 70th Division went to India) and were assigned to 34th Indian Division, which formed the garrison of the island. 51st (W&C) Field Rgt was still short of one battery HQ, but on 20 March it was joined by 14 Heavy Anti-Aircraft (HAA) Bty from 6th Coast Regiment, RA. This was a Regular Army battery formed on 1 March 1938 in 6th Coast Rgt, which manned the coast defences in Ceylon.

After the Japanese successes against Burma and the Dutch East Indies, a Japanese fleet moved into the India Ocean with the intention of carrying out a 'Pearl Harbor'-style attack on the British Eastern Fleet based in Ceylon. Carrier-based aircraft carried out a raid on the Colombo Naval Base on 5 April 1942 (the 'Easter Sunday Raid') and the anti-aircraft defences were heavily engaged. There was a second attack on Trincomalee Naval Base on 9 April. However, there was no follow-up landings, and the coast and field artillery saw no action. The vulnerability of Ceylon had been demonstrated however, and the defences were on high alert for months.

By the end of 1942, however, the crisis had passed and some of the defences in Ceylon could be stood down. 14 HAA Bty passed into suspended animation on 30 September 1942 16th Brigade and 51st (W&C) Field Rgt left 34th Indian Division on 31 January 1943 and crossed to India, moving to Ranchi to rejoin 70th Division.

=== Chindits ===
From February to April 1943 Major-General Orde Wingate's Long Range Penetration (LRP) Groups, the 'Chindits', had carried out their first operation into Japanese-held Burma (Operation Longcloth). After the lessons learned it was decided to increase 'Special Force' to six brigades for future operations, and 70th Division was selected to be broken up to provide three of these. 16th Brigade and 51st (W&C) Field Rgt left the division on 29 September 194. In September the regiment was joined by 587 (Independent) Field Bty, which had been formed in India in 1942 from a troop of A Bty, 160th Field Rgt. The augmented regiment then handed in its guns and began converting to an infantry role. On 18 October 51st (W&C) Field Rgt was amalgamated with 69th (Duke of Connaught's Hampshire) Light Anti-Aircraft/Anti-Tank Rgt to form an infantry battalion designated 51st/69th Regiment, RA, which trained in the LRP role.

The combined regiment formed 51 and 69 Columns of 16th Bde for the Second Chindit Expedition (Operation Thursday). After several changes of plan, 16th Bde under Brig Bernard Fergusson began its long march from Ledo in Assam into Burma on 5 February, proceeding down a single-file track towards Hkalak Ga. The going was extremely difficult, and the head of the brigade took until 16 February to cover the 35 miles (56 km) to Hkalak Ga. Progress was then quicker, and the brigade reached the Chindwin River on 28 February, 10 days behind schedule. It turned a sandbank into an airstrip and then began crossing the river on 1 March aboard assault boats brought in by gliders. The head of the column moved off that night towards its objective of Indaw, detaching two columns (possibly 51 and 69) to attack Lonkin. The rest of 16th Bde established a stronghold codenamed 'Aberdeen' near Manhton and on 22 March gliders flew in material to construct an airstrip. The fresh 14th Bde then began to be flown in on 23 March, but 16th Bde was ordered to attack Indaw without time for concentrate or for rest after its long march. The other six columns of the brigade made the attack, but it failed with heavy casualties. Fergusson then concentrated his brigade in the hills to reorganise and await support.

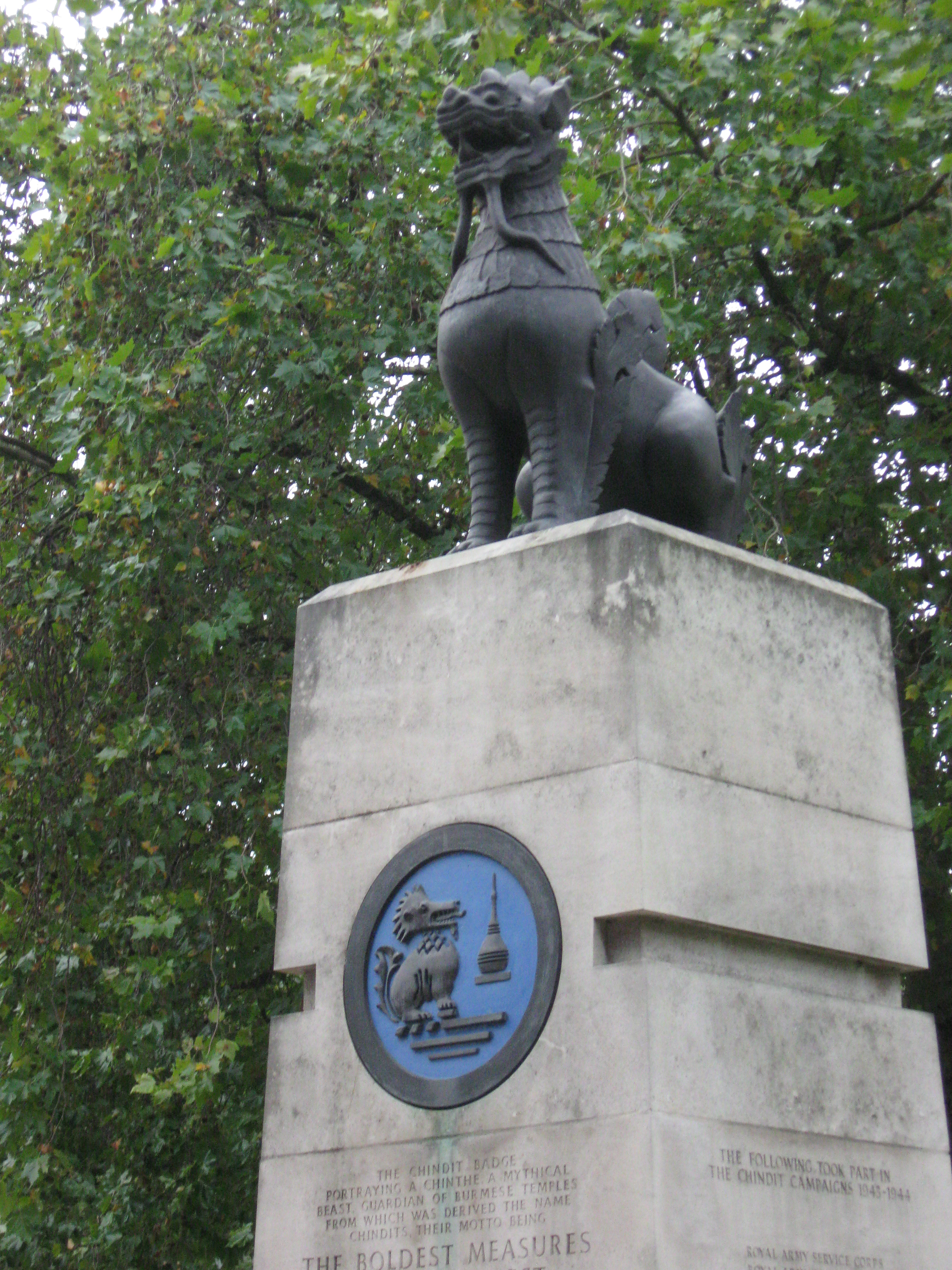
The Chindit Memorial in Victoria Embankment Gardens, London

By the beginning of 16 April Bde was back at 'Aberdeen', while the fresh Chindit formations were being flown in to continue the operation. It was then decided to fly out the exhausted units of 16th Bde. The brigade was moved to Comilla in East Bengal and by 17 May was at Bangalore in India. About a quarter of the personnel of 51st/69th Rgt were sent to the UK, either because they were unfit for further service after their exertions and sickness or were eligible for repatriation under the 'Python' scheme after three years and eight months' overseas service. The remainder of the regiment were drafted to 1st Battalion Essex Regiment, which had also returned from the Chindit expedition, and continued as infantry until the end of the war> However, the Chindits did not see action again and 'Special Force' was disbanded in February 1945.

On 14 October 1944 the 51st (W&C) Field and 69th Anti-Tank regiments reverted to their original designations and formally passed into suspended animation.

== Postwar ==
When the TA was reconstituted on 1 January 1947, the regiment was reformed as 251 (Westmorland & Cumberland) Field Rgt as part of 42nd (Lancashire) Division. On 30 June 1950 it absorbed two other Cumbrian RA regiments: 309 (W&C) Field Rgt (originally its own duplicate 109th Field Rgt, see above) and 640 (Border) Heavy Anti-Aircraft Regiment (formerly 5th Battalion Border Regiment) without changing its designation. Then on 30 September 1953 it regained its full Yeomanry subtitle as 251 (Westmorland & Cumberland Yeomanry) Field Regiment, RA. When the TA was reduced in 1961, the regiment became a single independent battery, as 851 (W&CY) Field Battery, which was eventually absorbed into the Border Regiment.
