= 42nd (East Lancashire) Infantry Division =

Former infantry division of the British Army

East Lancashire Division 42nd (East Lancashire) Division 42nd (East Lancashire) Infantry Division 42nd Armoured Division 42nd (Lancashire) Division
- 42nd (East Lancashire) Division insignia, First World War
- Active: 1908–1919; 1920–1941; 1947–1961
- Country: United Kingdom
- Branch: British Army
- Type: Infantry
- Size: Division
- Peacetime HQ: Manchester
- Motto: Go One Better (Note: The motto "Go One Better" was bestowed on the division by its commander Major-General Arthur Solly-Flood on 1 March 1918, as part of his address to the officers and N.C.O.s in anticipation of the German Spring Offensive.)
- Engagements: First World War; Second World War

Commanders
- Notable commanders: William Douglas; Bertram Mitford; Arthur Solly-Flood; William Beach; Sir Hugh Elles; Sir Miles Dempsey; Sir Geoffrey Evans; Vyvyan Evelegh

Insignia
- Identification symbol: 42nd Division insignia, Second World War (infantry and armoured).

- Identification symbol: 42nd Division insignia, post Second World War, amalgamated with the 55th (West Lancashire) Division.

The 42nd (East Lancashire) Infantry Division was an infantry division of the British Army. The division was raised in 1908 as part of the Territorial Force (TF), originally as the East Lancashire Division, and was redesignated as the 42nd (East Lancashire) Division on 25 May 1915. It was the first TF division to be sent overseas during the First World War. The division fought at Gallipoli, in the Sinai desert and on the Western Front in France and Belgium. Disbanded after the war, it was reformed in the Territorial Army (TA), in the Second World War it served as the 42nd (East Lancashire) Infantry Division with the British Expeditionary Force (BEF) and fought in Belgium and France before being evacuated at Dunkirk. The division was later reformed in the United Kingdom and, in November 1941, was converted into the 42nd Armoured Division, which was disbanded in October 1943 without serving overseas. A 2nd Line duplicate formation, the 66th Infantry Division, was created when the Territorials were doubled in both world wars.

The division was disbanded during the war but was reformed in the TA in 1947 after the Second World War. Beckett 2008 says that TA units that were in suspended animation were formally reactivated on 1 January 1947, although no personnel were assigned until commanding officers and permanent staff had been appointed in March and April 1947. From December 1955, the division was placed on a lower establishment, for home defence purposes only. On 1 May 1961, the division was merged with North West District to become 42nd Lancashire Division/North West District.

== Formation ==
The Territorial Force (TF) was formed on 1 April 1908 following the enactment of the Territorial and Reserve Forces Act 1907 (7 Edw.7, c.9) which combined and re-organised the old Volunteer Force, the Honourable Artillery Company and the Yeomanry. On formation, the TF contained 14 infantry divisions and 14 mounted yeomanry brigades. One of the divisions was the East Lancashire Division. In peacetime, the divisional headquarters was, from 1910, in the National Buildings at St Mary's Parsonage in Manchester.

== First World War ==
The division, commanded since the year before by Major General William Douglas, was embodied upon the outbreak of war. The war station was intended to be Ireland; but, due to its pacific state, the intended move did not materialise. After a brief period at their drill halls, the various units proceeded to large tented camps at Turton Bottoms (near Bolton), Chesham (near Bury) and Holingworth Lake, Littleborough (near Rochdale). The personnel were asked to volunteer for overseas service, and the overwhelming majority did so, the deficiencies made up of men from the National Reserve and other re-enlistments. The 'home service' men formed the cadre of duplicate units, intended to train the rush of volunteers at the drill halls. These would form the divisional reserve, and later become the 66th (2nd East Lancashire) Division.

In 1914, the East Lancashire Division was one of 14 infantry divisions and 55 mounted regiments, called the Yeomanry, that made up the Territorial Force. Lord Kitchener, the Secretary of State for War, described these divisions and regiments of mainly white–collar workers as "a town clerk's army". Their junior officers were trained at the Officer Training Corps set up at the universities and large public schools, such as Eton and Harrow. Kitchener sent these forces to the peripheral campaigns; to the Sudan, Mesopotamia, Egypt and the Caucasus, to release Regular British Army soldiers for duty on the Western Front because he thought these amateur soldiers 'might not be able to hold their own with the German Army'.

=== Egypt ===
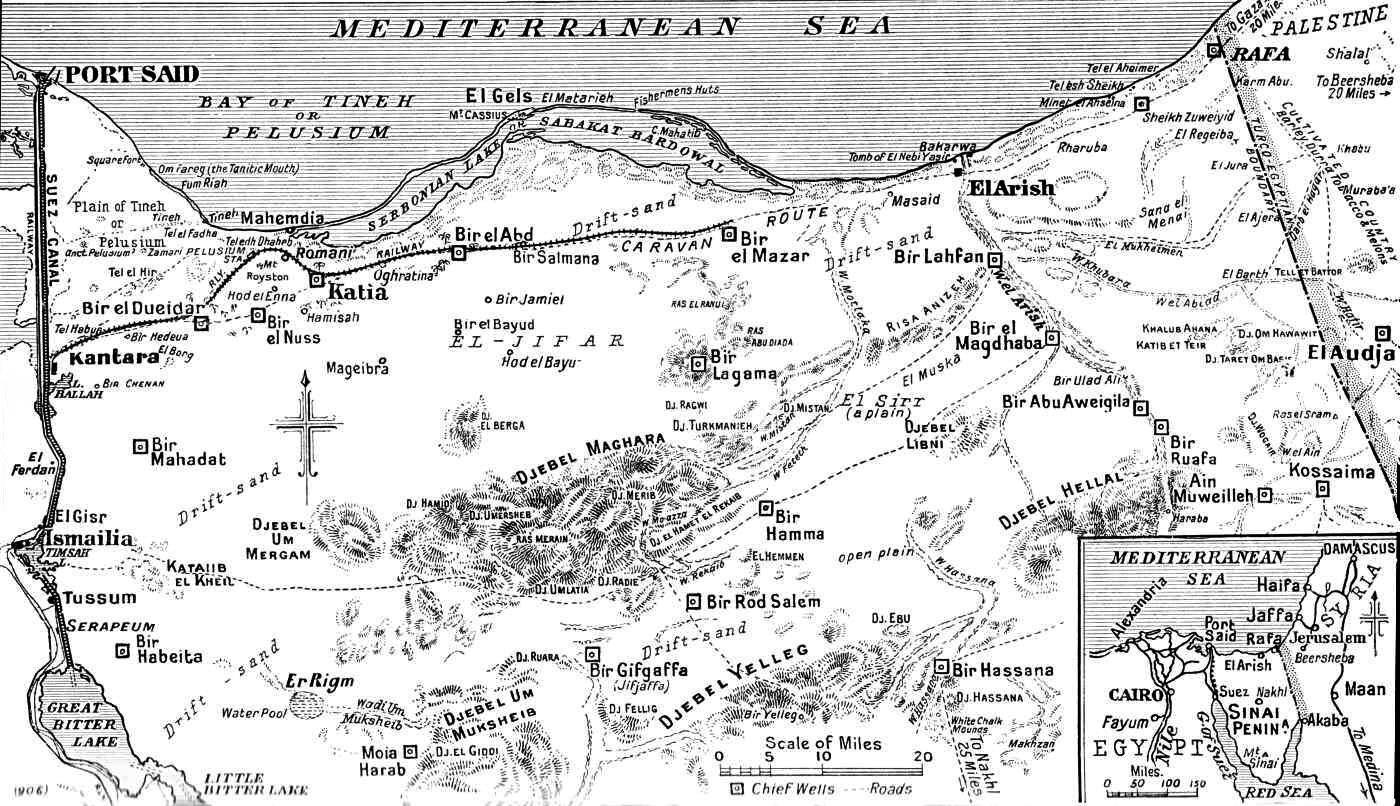
Suez Canal zone and Sinai, WWI

The East Lancashire Division arrived in Egypt on 25 September 1914 and served in the interior, around Cairo (with some elements stationed in Cyprus and the Sudan) together with some Yeomanry units, and the Australian and New Zealand contingents before going to Gallipoli.

The division was sent to Egypt to defend the Suez Canal against anticipated Turkish attacks. The 15 pounder gun batteries were deployed at key points on the west bank in support of Indian Army and New Zealand troops manning guardposts. The 20th Battery (Bolton Artillery) fired the division's first artillery rounds of the Great War, and the first of the Territorial Force of the campaign, near El Ferdan on 2 February 1915. The 19th Battery (Bolton Artillery) was in action in support of Indian and New Zealand troops between Tussum and Serapeum on the night and morning of 3–4 February 1915, against the attempted crossing of the canal by the 74th Regiment, Turkish 25th Division.

=== Gallipoli ===
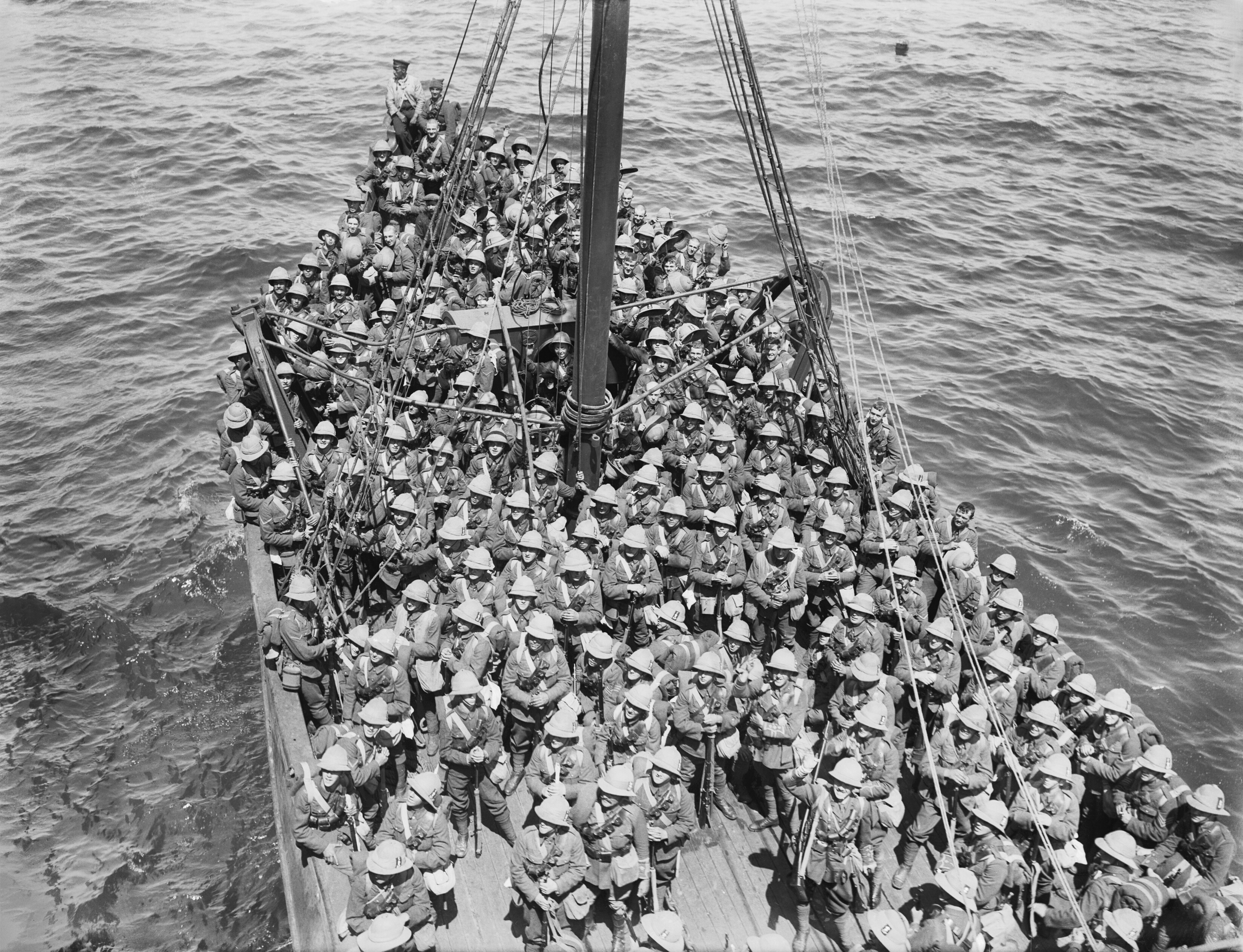
A boat carrying Lancashire Fusiliers, bound for Gallipoli. Photo by Ernest Brooks.

Beginning in early May 1915, the division joined the British Army Corps, from June known as VIII Corps, at Cape Helles following the failure of the Allies to achieve the anticipated swift success at Gallipoli during April. On 26 May 1915 the division received its number, becoming the 42nd (East Lancashire) Division, and the brigades were also numbered, becoming 125th (1/1st Lancashire Fusiliers) Brigade, 126th (1/1st East Lancashire) Brigade and 127th (1/1st Manchester) Brigade.

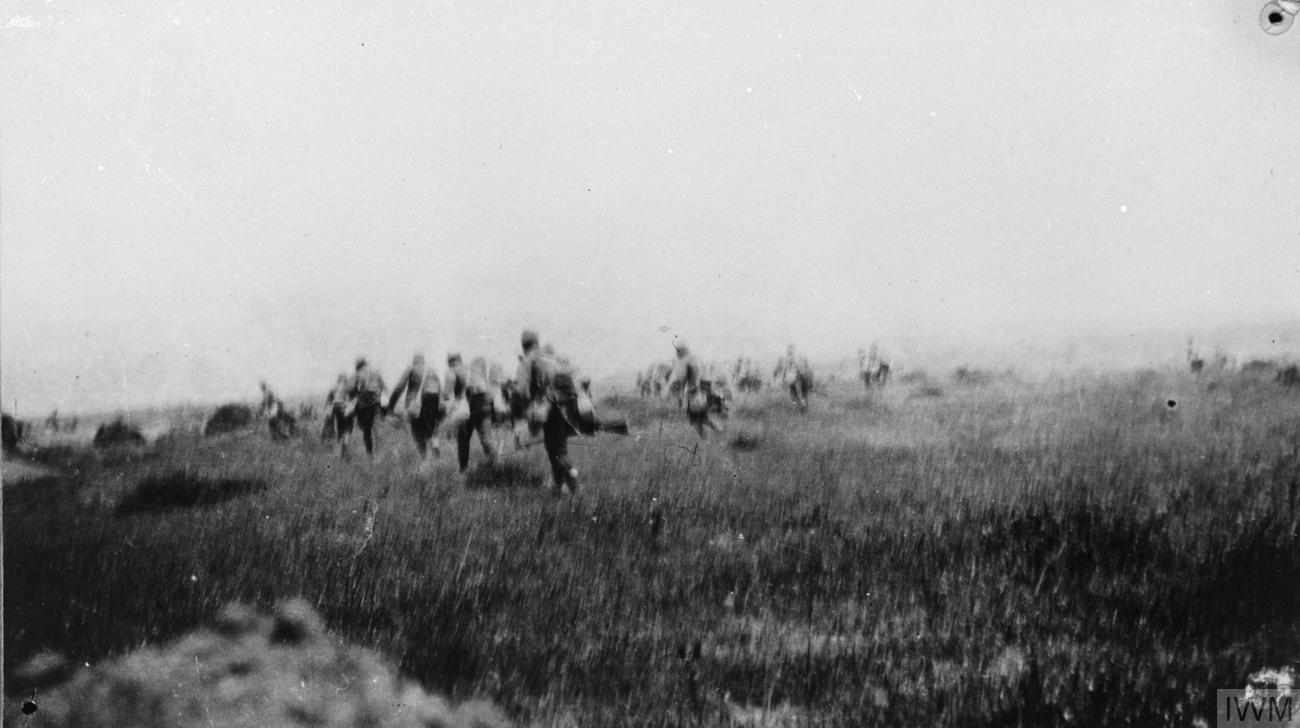
Tommies of the 1/6th Battalion, Manchester Regiment, advancing over open terrain during the Third Battle of Krithia, June 1915.

The 4th (Blackburn) battery, 1 section of the 6th (Burnley) battery, and 19th and 20th (Bolton) batteries did not join the division on Gallipoli until 23/24 September, and the 1st/2nd East Lancs Brigade RFA (Manchester Artillery) arrived in Egypt in May from Britain and remained in Egypt.

The 125th (Lancashire Fusiliers) Brigade landed in time to participate in the Second Battle of Krithia on 6 May and the 126th Brigade arrived on 11 May. The entire division was involved in the Third Battle of Krithia on 4 June.

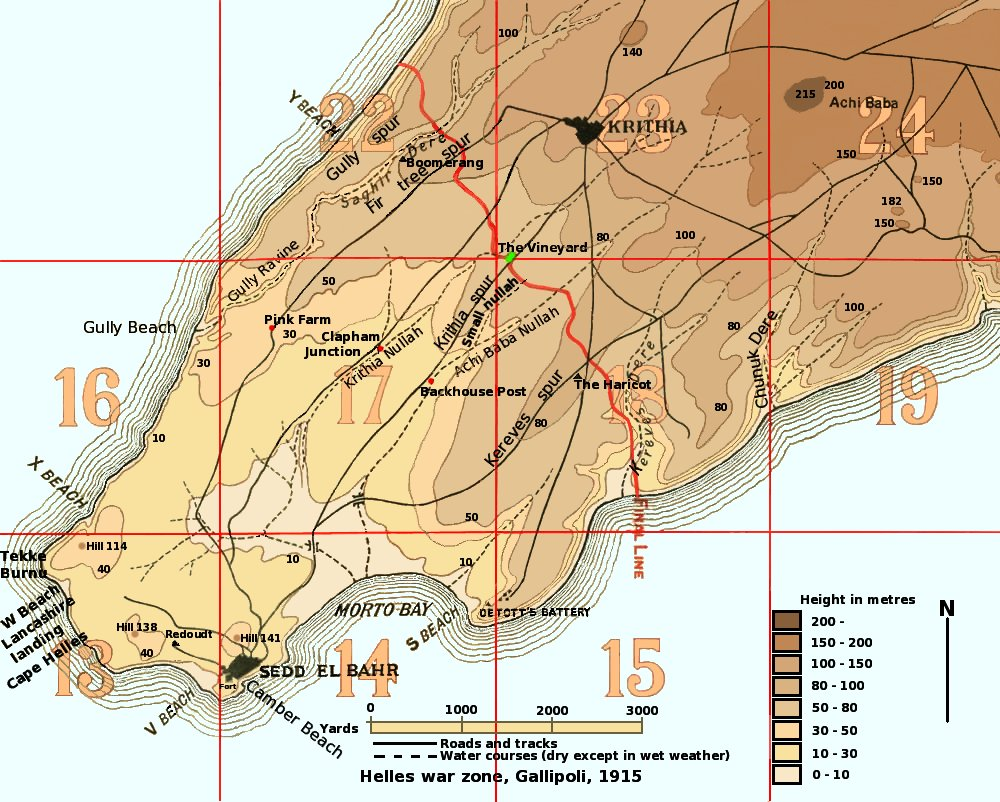
Area of operations of the 42nd Division on Gallipoli.

The division carried out the Helles diversion at the start of the Battle of Sari Bair in what became known as the Battle of Krithia Vineyard. Captain William Thomas Forshaw of the 1/9th Battalion, Manchester Regiment was awarded the Victoria Cross for his actions in this battle from 7 to 9 August.

Second Lieutenant Alfred Victor Smith of the 1/5th Battalion, East Lancashire Regiment was posthumously awarded the VC for his action at Helles on 23 December.

The division remained at Gallipoli until the final evacuation of Helles in January 1916 but was severely depleted by casualties and illness. The 42nd Division's casualties at Gallipoli were 395 officers and 8,152 other ranks killed, wounded and missing.

=== Egypt and the Sinai Campaign ===
After the evacuation of Gallipoli, the division returned to Egypt, and was renamed the 42nd (East Lancashire) Division. As such it participated in the Battle of Romani and the advance from Romani to Katia.

The 42nd Division served at Kantara on the Suez Canal in No. 3 Section of the Suez Canal Defences under General Lawrence until they were entrained for the railhead at Pelusium on the first day of the Battle of Romani on 4 August 1916.

Map of Romani Battlefield

On arrival late in the day, the 127th Brigade of the 42nd Division took over outpost duties at 1930 hours while the New Zealand Mounted Rifle and 5th Mounted Yeomanry Brigades, which had been heavily involved in fighting during the day, withdrew to water and rest at Pelusium.

On the second day of battle, 5 August 1916, the 42nd Division along with the 52nd (Lowland) Division, which had fought the previous day from their entrenched position, were ordered to move out to support the Australian Light Horse and New Zealand Mounted Rifles Brigades in a pursuit of the enemy. The 42nd Division was not prepared for the conditions they found in the Sinai desert. They had not been trained to operate in heavy sand in mid summer heat, and with insufficient water, extreme distress and tragedy followed. The mounted troops alone, were unable to stop the enemy making a disciplined withdrawal to water at Katia and to fall back in good order, the following day.

The 127th Brigade, 42nd Division eventually reached Katia the next day, 6 August; 800 men had died in the two-day march from Pelusium Station. The 125th Brigade of the 42nd Division and the 155th, and 157th brigades of the 52nd Division also had many men fall victim to thirst and the blazing sun; the infantry pursuit could not go on.

Robert Bethel, Army Service Corps, and McPherson, an officer in the Egyptian Camel Transport Corps, worked to transport provisions and water to the 125th and 127th brigades. They recorded what they saw of these terrible days. Nearly 50 years after serving with the 42nd Division in the Sinai, one veteran, gunner J. Thompson, confessed that the "sight of a leaking tap" made him "squirm".

By December 1916, the 42nd Division was furnishing units to protect the lines of communication at Salmana, Abu Tilul and the railway station Maadan and took part in a practice attack on 13 December. On 21 December, 42nd and 52nd Divisions marched from Kilo 128 to Bardawil and continued to move eastwards towards Masaid.

On 17 January 1917, the 42nd Division was no longer in the Sinai Campaign, having been among the first of the Territorial Force to receive orders for the Western Front. The division was replaced in Desert Column by another Territorial Division, the 53rd (Welsh) Division commanded by Dallas. The two other Territorial infantry divisions, the 52nd at Rafa and the 54th (East Anglian) Division ordered out to Romani from the Suez Canal, were put directly under General Dobell commander of Eastern Force. The 42nd Division departed Egypt early in February 1917.

=== Western Front ===
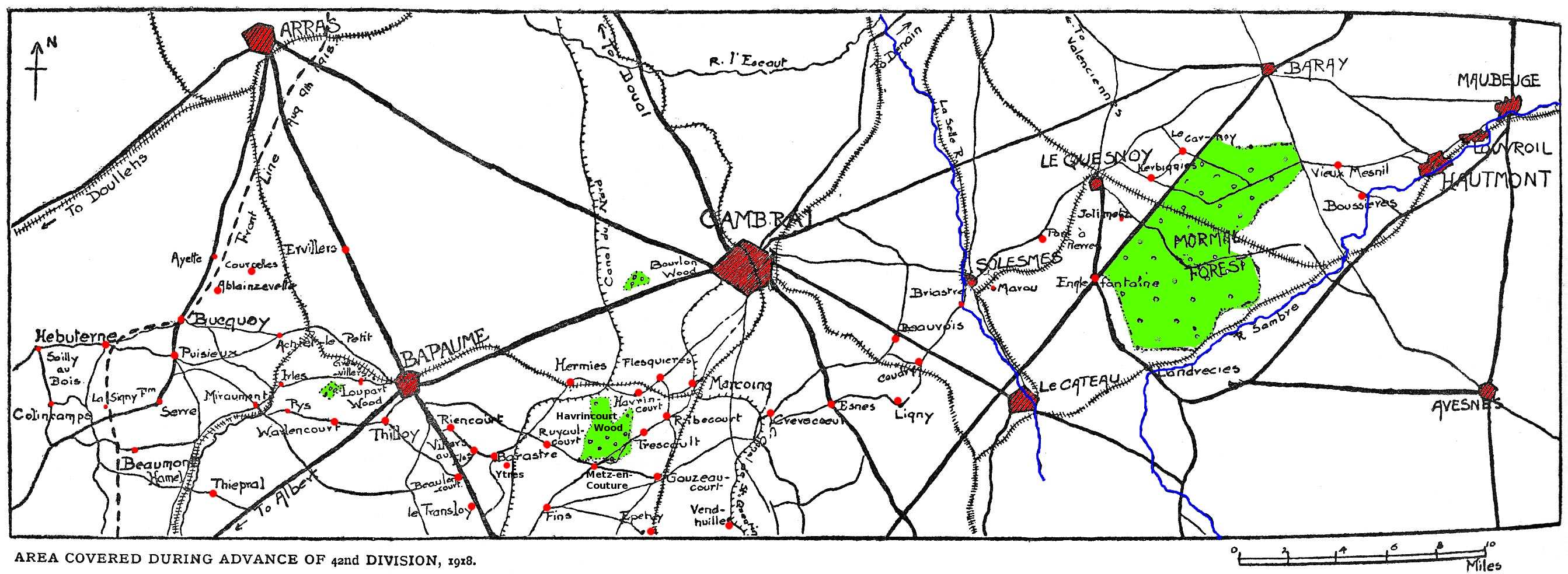
42nd Division 8 April – 22 August 1917, and 23 March – 11 November 1918

The division moved to France and joined 3 Corps in the Fourth Army in March 1917 and received a new commander in the same month, Major General Douglas, who had commanded since before the war, being replaced by Major General Bertram Mitford. It relieved the 48th (South Midland) Division on 8 May 1917 and held the line at Épehy before relieving the 20th (Light) Division and holding the line at Havrincourt, north of Epéhy, from 23 May 1917. Its infantry was relieved by the 58th (2/1st London) Division on 8 July 1917 but its divisional artillery remained in the line in support of 58th and then the 9th (Scottish) Division at Havrincourt Wood. It moved to the Ytres sector on 9 July 1917.

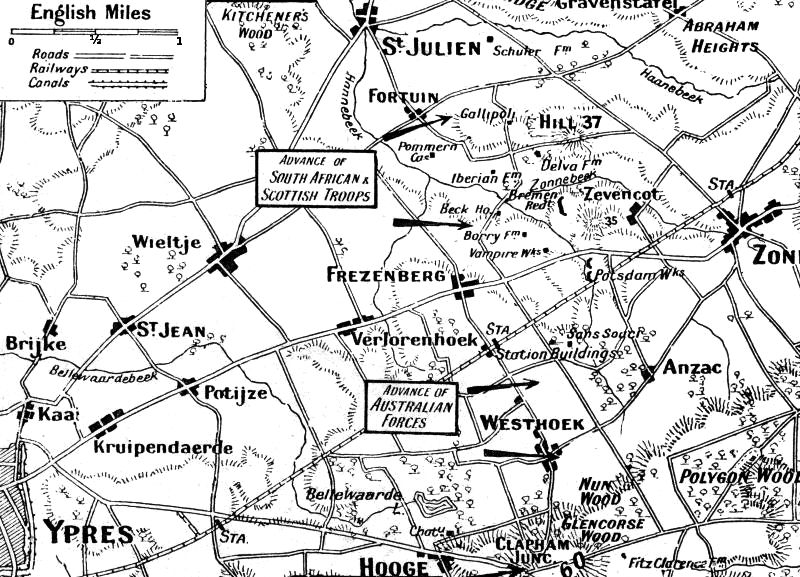
Area of the 42nd Division's operations near Ypres, 23 August – 29 September 1917

On 23 August 1917, it joined V Corps in the Fifth Army, although the infantry in Poperinghe area behind Ypres for training. Its divisional artillery entered line immediately in support of the 15th (Scottish) Division near Potijze Chateau. Its infantry relieved the 15th (Scottish) Division in the line to the right of Potijze Road near Frezenberg Ridge at Ypres on 1 September 1917 and on 6 September the 125th Brigade made an unsuccessful attempt to capture the fortified Iberian, Borry and Beck Farms during the Third Battle of Ypres.

The divisional infantry were relieved by the 9th (Scottish) Division and retired to Poperinghe area on 18 September 1917. Its divisional artillery remained in the line until 29 September, participated in the Battle of the Menin Road Ridge (20–26 September 1917) and advanced to exposed positions on Frezenberg Ridge on 25 September. On 26 September it relieved the 66th (2nd East Lancashire) Division. The divisional artillery rejoined and it held the line at Nieuport.

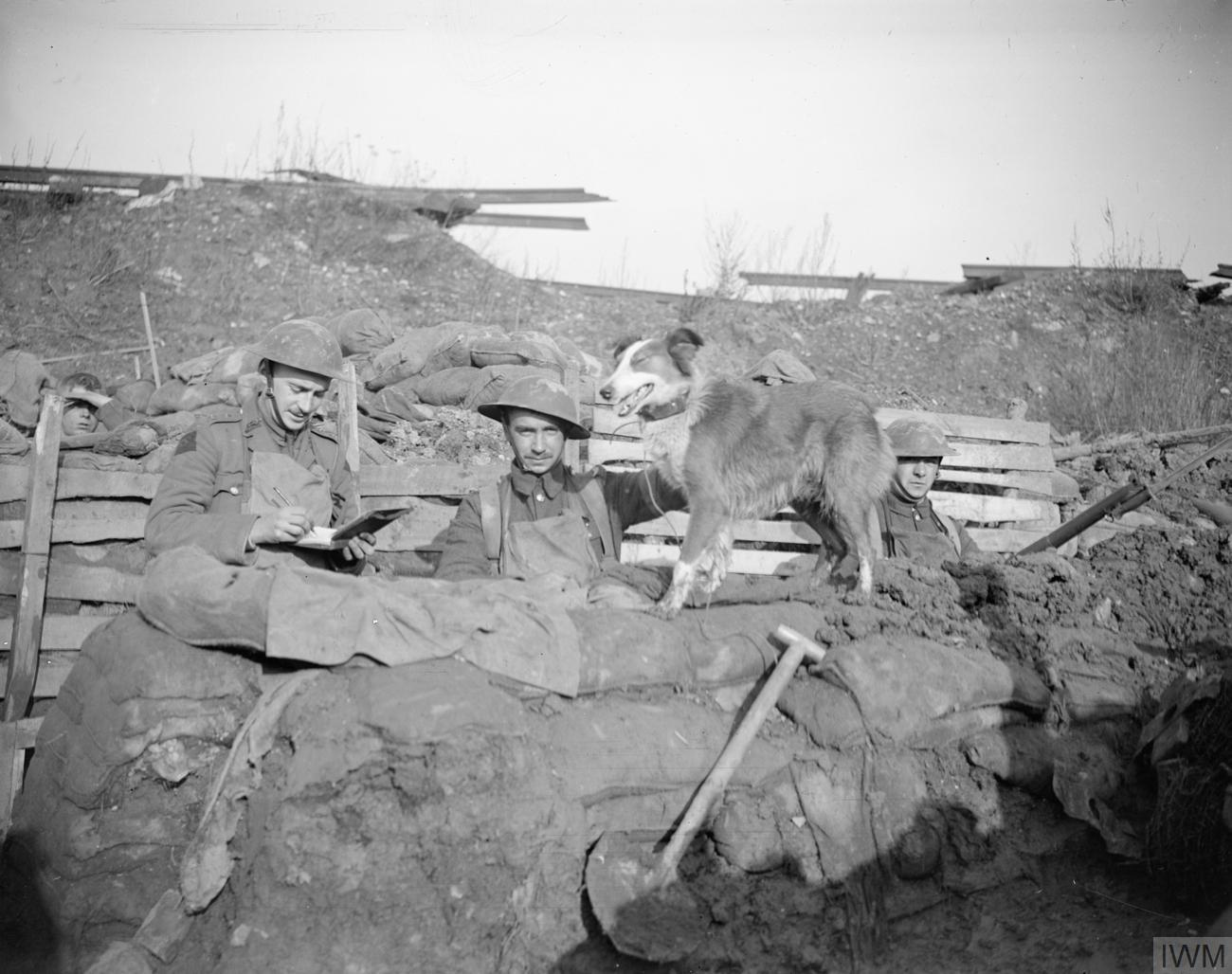
Trench message dog of 10th Manchesters waits while message is written, Cuinchy, 26 January 1918

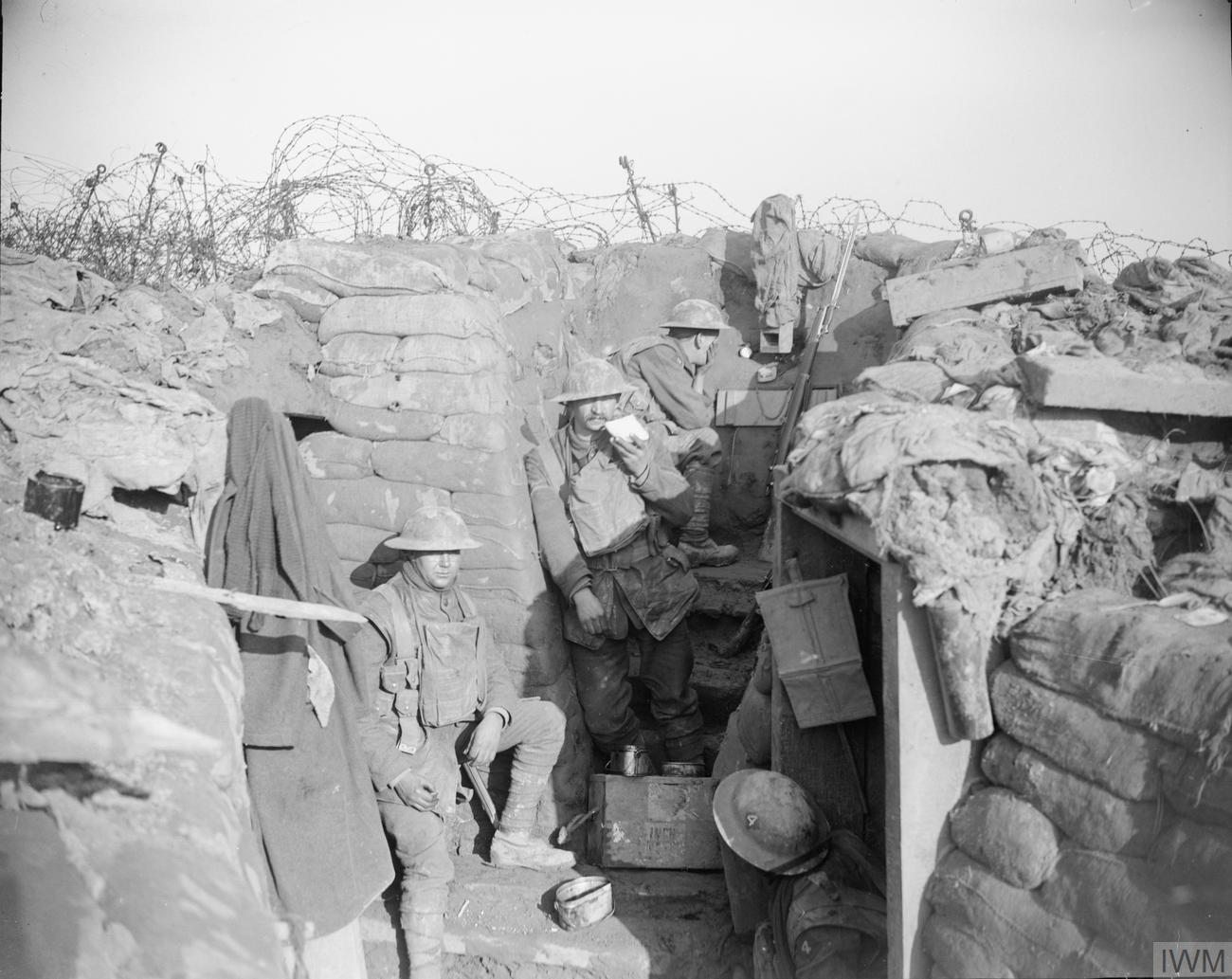
Men of the 4th East Lancs at a sap-head, Givenchy, 28 January 1918

On 29 November 1917 it relieved the 25th Division and held the line at Givenchy on the La Bassée sector. It constructed fortifications according to the new British defensive doctrine of "defended localities" in anticipation of major German attack. Private Walter Mills of C Company, the 1/10th Manchesters, was posthumously awarded the Victoria Cross for actions at Red Dragon Crater, Givenchy on the night of 10 December 1917.

It was relieved by the 55th (West Lancashire) Division on 15 February 1918. It was held in reserve and undertook training at Busnes–Burbure–Fouquieres area, forming part of the I Corps reserve and then the GHQ reserve from 1 March 1918.

On 23 March 1918 it joined VI Corps under the command of Lieutenant-General Sir Aylmer Haldane in the Third Army, initially in reserve, and then at Ervillers, to defend the line against the German 17th Army under the command of General Otto von Below on the right (i.e. north) wing of the German Spring Offensive (Kaiserschlacht) in the First Battle of the Somme (1918) and then the First Battle of Bapaume.

It counterattacked in the afternoon with seven tanks and 300 infantry from Logeast Wood to delay the German VI Reserve Corps on 25 March 1918. The 10th Manchesters repelled eight attacks by the German 2nd Guard Reserve Division, at Ervillers.

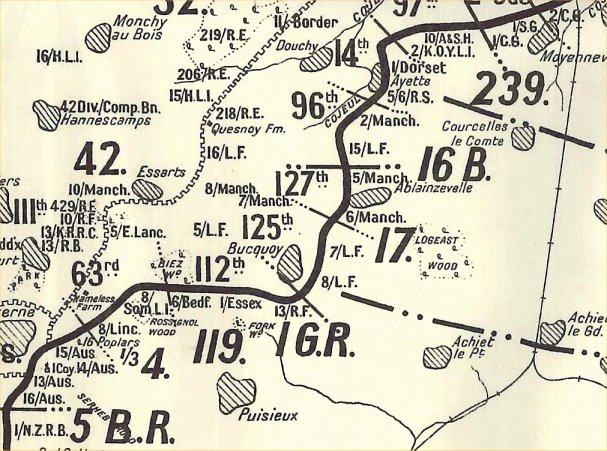
Positions on 5 April 1918

It retired the Ervillers–Bucquoy area on 26 March 1918. Together the 42nd and 62nd (2nd West Riding) Division held the Rossignol Wood–Bucquoy sector under heavy shelling against six attacks by the German 3rd Guard Infantry Division, the last with assistance of 11 Mk. IV tanks.

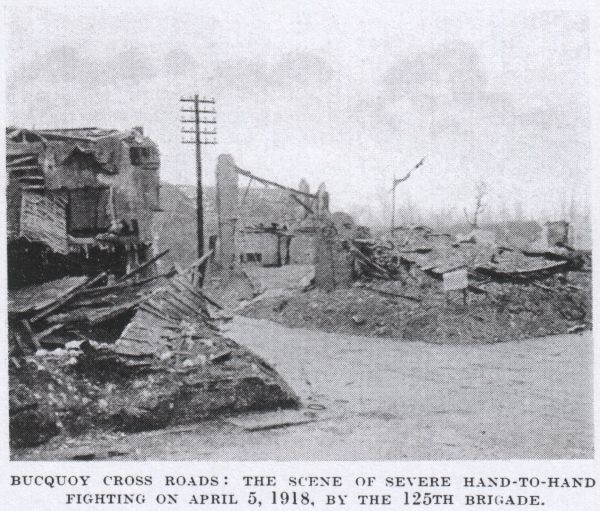
Bucquoy Crossroads, held by 125 Brigade in heavy fighting on 5 April 1918

It then held the line until end of final German assault on 5 April 1918 at Bucquoy and held the line at Bucquoy, Gommecourt, Hébuterne from 6 April 1918. It served with the IV Corps in the Third Army from 21 August 1918 and attacked and advanced Miraumont, across the River Ancre, Pys, Warlencourt during the Second Battle of the Somme (1918) including the Battle of Albert (1918). Their opponent was the 183rd Division. Lance-Sergeant Edward Smith of the 1/5th Battalion, Lancashire Fusiliers was awarded the Victoria Cross for actions in the capture of The Lozenge (Hill 140, a German machine-gun nest) on 21 August and enemy counter-attacks on 22 August.

The infantry withdrew for two days rest in Miraumont–Pys area on 25 August 1918. The divisional artillery went into action under heavy fire in support of 63rd (Royal Naval) Division on the outskirts of Loupart Wood. It then relieved 63rd Division in the line and resumed its advance on 28 August 1918. It attacked and advanced to Thilloy, Riencourt-lès-Bapaume, Villers-au-Flos, Ytres, across the Canal du Nord to Metz-en-Couture in the Second Battle of the Somme (1918) including the Second Battle of Bapaume. Its infantry relieved by New Zealand Division and moved to rest in Pys-Tholloy area on 6 September 1918. The divisional artillery remained in the line in support of New Zealand Division. On 21 September 1918 it relieved 37th Division east of Havrincourt Wood.

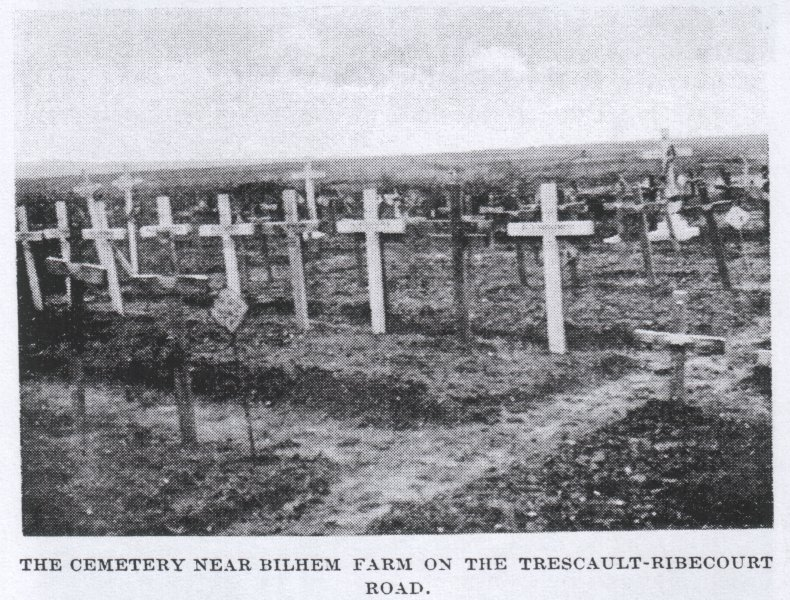
Graves of 42nd Division's fallen in the breaking of the Hindenburg Line, near Bilhem Farm, Trescault–Ribecourt Road, photographed in 1919 (Today known as Ribecourt Road Cemetery)

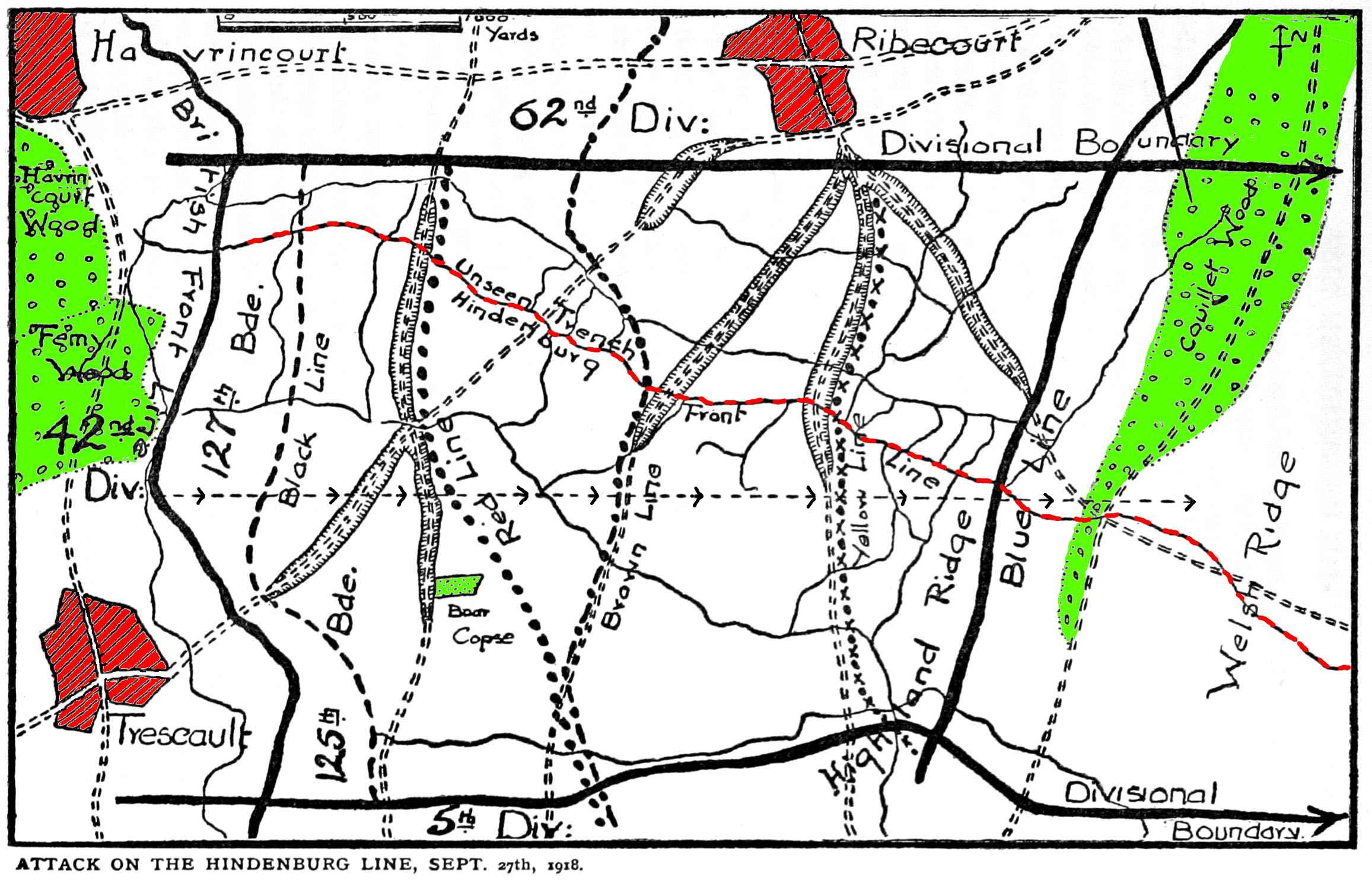
42nd Division's attack through the Hindenburg Line 27/28 September 1918

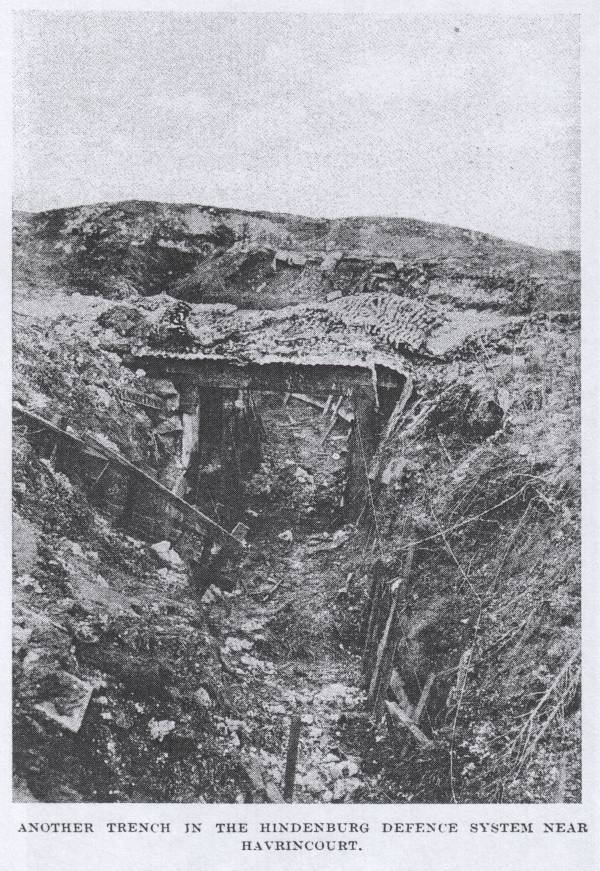
Trench in the Hindenburg Line near Havrincourt taken by 42nd Division

On 27 September 1918 it attacked and advanced Havrincourt Wood through the Siegfriedstellung (Hindenburg Line) via objectives called the Black, Red, Brown, Yellow and Blue lines, to Welsh Ridge. The Hindenburg Line was attacked in enfilade, or diagonally, as can be seen from the map. Many casualties were sustained from machine guns situated in Beaucamps to the right of the division's front during the Battle of the Canal du Nord. Its infantry relieved by New Zealand Division and withdrew to Havrincourt Wood for rest on 29 September 2018. The divisional artillery remained in action in support of the New Zealand Division in the Pursuit to the Selle.

On 9 October 1918 its infantry marched up to the front through Lesdain, Esnes, Beauvois and relieved New Zealand Division, who had established a bridgehead across the River Selle at Briastre. It defended Briastre against German counterattacks and shelling from 12 October 1918 and then advanced across the River Selle to Marou, Virtigneul and Belle Vue Farm during the Battle of the Selle. Private Alfred Robert Wilkinson of the 1/5th Manchesters was awarded the Victoria Cross for actions on 20 October 1918 at Marou. The division's opponent in these actions was the 25th Division.

On 20 October 1918 at Briastre Private J. H. Chapman of the 1/10th Manchester Regt was awarded the Military Medal. He was the No.1 of a Lewis Gun Team when the leading men of his Company were passing through the enemy wire and brought his gun into action when fired at close range by an enemy machine gun, he successfully knocked out the gun killing the crew. Being wounded he handed his Lewis gun over to the No.2 and continued the advance, a matter of 1,500 yards as a rifleman to the final objective where he bayonetted several of the enemy. He only had his wounds dressed after the position had been consolidated.

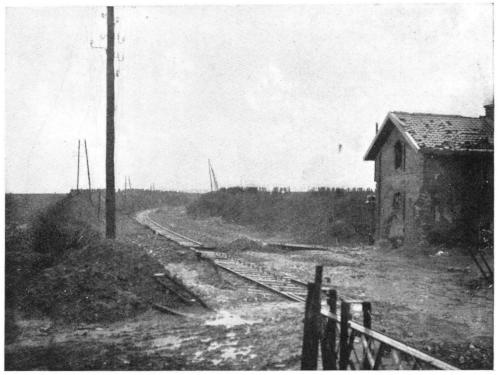
Photograph of the railway cutting in Briastre captured by the 42nd Division October 1918

It was relieved by New Zealand Division on 24 October 1918 and withdrew to Beauvois for a rest. It then moved up though Le Quesnoy and Forêt de Mormal in support of the advance of the 37th Division and New Zealand Division on 3 November 1918. It relieved the New Zealand Division in line of attack on eastern edge of Forest of Mormal and attacked and advanced to Hautmont in the Arrondissement of Avesnes-sur-Helpe on 6 November 1918. It was standing fast on line Maubeuge–Avesnes-sur-Helpe Road when the Armistice of 11 November 1918 came into force.

== First World War composition ==
The infantry were equipped with the obsolescent Long Magazine Lee–Enfield (MLE) rifle from embarkation in 1914 until arrival in France in March 1917, when they were re-equipped with the standard modern Short Magazine Lee–Enfield (SMLE).

=== Infantry ===
The division comprised three infantry brigades:

125th (Lancashire Fusiliers) Brigade

- 1/5th Battalion, Lancashire Fusiliers from Bury, outlying detachments at Radcliffe and Heywood.
- 1/6th Battalion, Lancashire Fusiliers from Rochdale, outlying detachments at Middleton and Todmorden.

Disbanded February 1918. Men transferred within 42nd Division and to 66th Division.

- 1/7th Battalion, Lancashire Fusiliers from Salford
- 1/8th Battalion, Lancashire Fusiliers from Salford

126th (East Lancashire) Brigade

- 1/4th Battalion, East Lancashire Regiment from Blackburn

Disbanded February 1918. Men transferred within 42nd Division and to 66th Division.

- 1/5th Battalion, East Lancashire Regiment from Burnley
- 1/9th Battalion, Manchester Regiment from Ashton-under-Lyne

Disbanded February 1918. Men transferred within 42nd Division and to 66th Division.

- 1/10th Battalion, Manchester Regiment from Oldham
- 1/8th (Ardwick) Battalion, Manchester Regiment

Transferred from 127th Brigade February 1918.

127th (Manchester) Brigade

- 1/5th Battalion, Manchester Regiment from Wigan, outlying detachments at Haydock, Atherton, Patricroft, and Swinton.
- 1/6th Battalion, Manchester Regiment from Manchester and suburbs including Cheshire
- 1/7th Battalion, Manchester Regiment from Manchester and suburbs including Cheshire
- 1/8th (Ardwick) Battalion, Manchester Regiment from Ardwick and East Manchester

Transferred to 126th Brigade February 1918.

=== Pioneers and Cavalry ===
- 1/7th Battalion, Northumberland Fusiliers

Joined the 42nd Division from 50th (Northumbrian) Division on 12 February 1918 near Bethune after being converted from an infantry battalion. 3 companies

- A Squadron, 1/1st Duke of Lancaster's Own Yeomanry from Oldham

Did not proceed to Gallipoli; remained in Egypt and fought in the Western Desert expedition against the Senussi. Rejoined 42nd Division after it returned to Egypt from Gallipoli. Transferred to 53rd Division January 1917 and fought at Gaza, then served with 60th and 52nd Divisions in Palestine and Syria.

=== Divisional artillery ===
Originally, each of the field gun batteries was equipped with four obsolescent BLC 15-pounder field guns (referred to somewhat inaccurately by Ian Hamilton as "relics of South Africa"). They were replaced on 29 February 1916 with modern QF 18-pounder guns handed over by 29th Division in Egypt.

- 1st East Lancs Brigade R.F.A. (R.F.A.)
  Renamed 210 Brigade 6 May 1916
  - 4th Lancashire Battery from Blackburn. Renamed A Battery 6 May 1916.
  - 5th Lancashire Battery from Church. Renamed B Battery 6 May 1916.
  - 6th Lancashire Battery from Burnley. Renamed C Battery 6 May 1916.
- 2nd East Lancs Brigade R.F.A. (Manchester Artillery)
  Arrived Egypt May 1915, did not go to Gallipoli.
  Renamed 211 Brigade 29 May 1916
  - 15th Lancashire Battery from Manchester. Renamed A Battery 29 May 1916.
  - 16th Lancashire Battery from Manchester. Renamed B Battery 29 May 1916.
  - 17th Lancashire Battery from Manchester. Renamed C Battery 29 May 1916.
- 3rd East Lancs Brigade R.F.A. (Bolton Artillery)
  Renamed 212 Brigade 29 May 1916
  - 18th Lancashire Battery from Bolton and district. Renamed A Battery 29 May 1916.
  - 19th Lancashire Battery from Bolton and district. Renamed B Battery 29 May 1916.
  - 20th Lancashire Battery from Bolton and district. Renamed C Battery 29 May 1916.
- 4th East Lancs (Howitzer) Brigade R.F.A. (The Cumberland Artillery)
  Originally, each of the 2 batteries was equipped with 4 obsolescent BL 5 inch Howitzers ("some of them Omdurman veterans").
  Joined Division on Gallipoli in July 1915 from Egypt. However, only limited supplies of the new 40 pound 5-inch shells were sent from Mudros (older shells were 50 pounds). No range tables for the lighter and hence longer-range shell were available, and they had a new pattern fuse for which no fuse keys were available. Hence, use of these howitzers at Gallipoli became very limited.
  Renamed 213 Brigade in May 1916.
  Re-equipped in June 1916 with modern QF 4.5 inch Howitzers.
  - 1st Cumberland (Howitzer) Battery from Carlisle. Renamed A Battery in May 1916.
  - 2nd Cumberland (Howitzer) Battery from Workington. Renamed B Battery in May 1916.
- 2nd Lancashire Heavy Battery, Royal Garrison Artillery, from Liverpool. Left in England when division embarked for Egypt.

==== 1917 field artillery reorganization ====
In February 1917, the Cumberland Artillery / 213 Brigade was disbanded and its two howitzer batteries merged into the 18-pounder brigades in accordance with the new artillery brigade philosophy. Existing four-gun, 18-pounder batteries in each of 210, 211 and 212 Brigades were merged into six-gun batteries, and the four brigades replaced by new 210 and 211 Brigades, each with 3 six-gun, 18-pounder batteries and one howitzer battery.

Gibbon's divisional history states that the above occurred on paper on Christmas Day 1916, when the division was on manoeuvres at Al Mazar, and the reorganization actually occurred in February 1917 on return to the canal zone.

Hence, from February 1917 to 11 November 1918, the divisional artillery consisted of 210 and 211 Brigades, each with 3 six-gun batteries of 18-pounders (A, B, C) and one battery of four 4.5-inch howitzers (D).

=== Trench mortar batteries ===
- V/42 Heavy Trench Mortar Battery. Formed in France March 1917
  Equipped with four 9.45 inch Heavy Mortars. Part of Divisional Artillery until 15 February 1918 when it remained in La Bassée sector under Corps command when the division departed.
- Medium Trench Mortar Batteries. Formed in France March 1917
  Initially 3 batteries, each equipped with four Newton 6 inch Mortars, and 2 batteries of 6 from February 1918, following the disbanding of Z Battery. Part of Divisional Artillery
  - X/42 Battery
  - Y/42 Battery
  - Z/42 Battery. Broken up February 1918. Redistributed to X and Y Batteries.
- Light Trench Mortar Batteries. Formed in France March 1917. Equipped with the 3 inch Stokes Mortar. Attached to the 3 infantry brigades and named after them.

=== 42 Battalion Machine Gun Corps ===
Formed 23 February 1918 from the previous four separate companies. One company was attached to each of the three infantry brigades and one company in Divisional Reserve.

=== 42nd (East Lancashire) Divisional Engineers ===
- 1/1st East Lancashire Field Company renamed 427 Field Company February 1917
- 1/2nd East Lancashire Field Company renamed 428 Field Company February 1917
- 1/3rd East Lancashire Field Company joined Division in June 1916 in Egypt. Renamed 429 Field Company February 1917
- 42nd (East Lancashire) Divisional Signal Company, Royal Engineers.

=== Combat Service Support ===
- Army Service Corps: 3 Companies
- Transport and Supply Column ASC. Left and joined 53rd (Welsh) Division in March 1917 and served in the operations against Gaza, then joined 74th (Yeomanry) Division. A new Divisional Train was formed in England and joined the 42nd Division in France after previously serving in France with the 3rd (Lahore) Division.

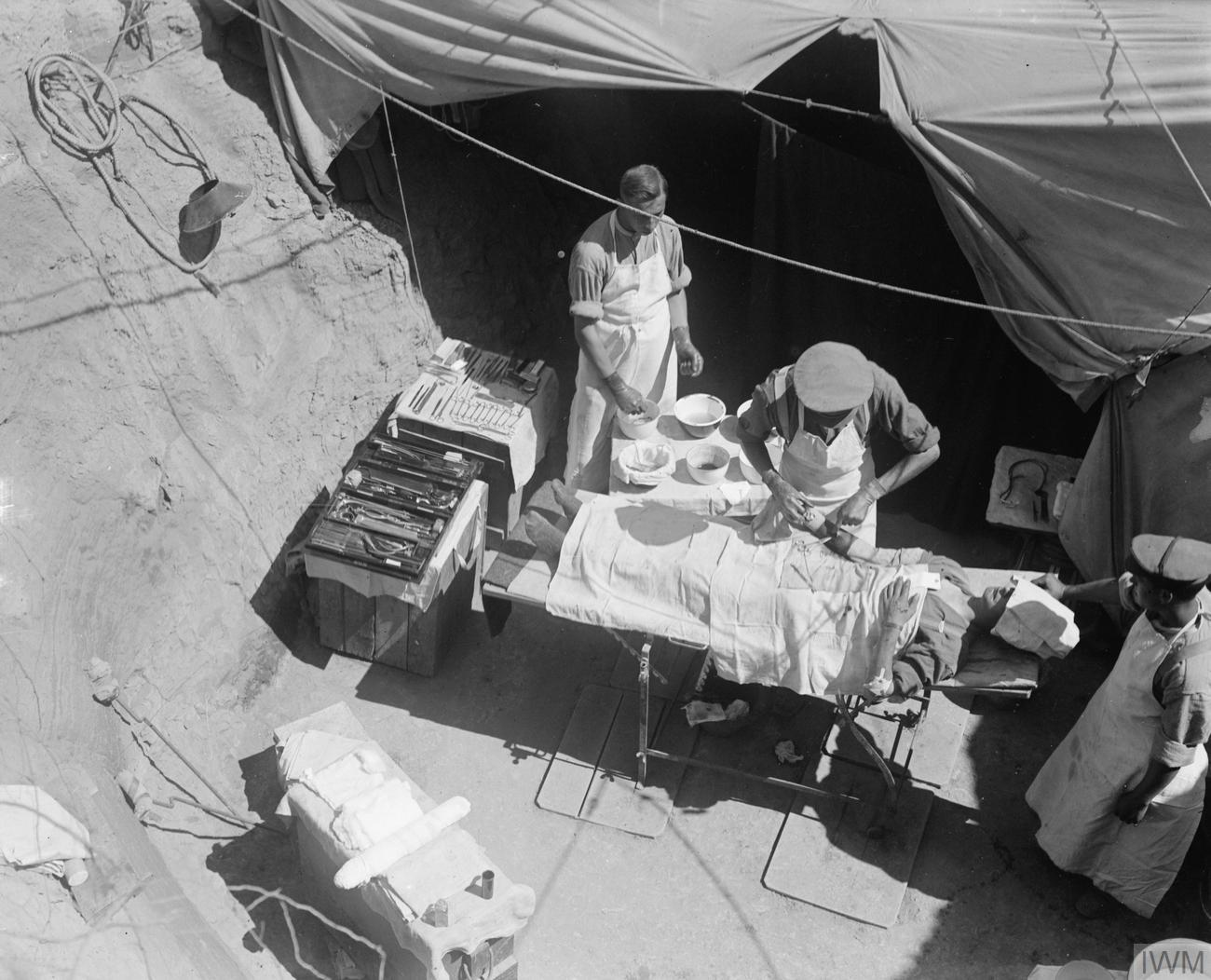
A surgery of one of the division's field ambulances. A surgeon Capt John Morley FRCS, who after the war became Professor of Surgery at Manchester University, removes a bullet from a soldier wounded during fighting at Cape Helles. Photo by Ernest Brooks.

- 1/1st East Lancashire Field Ambulance attached to 127 Brigade
- 1/2nd East Lancashire Field Ambulance did not proceed to Gallipoli; attached to 126 Brigade
- 1/3rd East Lancashire Field Ambulance; attached to 125 Brigade
- 19th Mobile Veterinary Section
- 239th Divisional Employment Company

== Between the wars ==
The division was disbanded after the war, along with the rest of the Territorial Force. However, it was later reformed in the 1920s as the Territorial Army and the 42nd Division was reconstituted.

== Second World War ==
Shortly after the outbreak of the Second World War on 3 September 1939, the 42nd Division, commanded by Major General William Holmes was serving under Western Command with its headquarters stationed in Manchester, and was mobilised for war service. The division, still comprising the 125th, 126th, and 127th Infantry Brigades, was understrength, having sent many of its best officers and men to help create a duplicate formation, the 66th Infantry Division, when the possibility of another conflict became obvious. Although war was declared, many of the division's units, widely scattered, were engaged in static defensive duties and guarding vulnerable positions, and so were initially unable to concentrate on training. In late September, the division moved to Northumberland where it came under Northern Command and was able to begin training, which continued into the winter.

In January 1940, the division moved to Wiltshire, coming under Southern Command and continued training in order to join the British Expeditionary Force (BEF) in France. By late March, training had progressed sufficiently and, in mid-April, the division crossed over to France, coming under the control of General Headquarters (GHQ) BEF, before being assigned to Lieutenant General Ronald Adam's III Corps on 29 April. While there, the division exchanged some of its units for Regular Army units, as part of official BEF policy, which was, in theory, intended to strengthen the inexperienced TA formations with experienced Regular units but this also had the simultaneous effect of weakening the Regular formations with relatively untrained troops.

The 42nd Division transferred from Adam's III Corps to Lieutenant General Michael Barker's I Corps on 19 May 1940, nine days after the German Army invaded France, as the division moved into the front line on the River Escaut. On 17 May, Brigadier John Smyth's 127th Brigade was detached to join "Mac Force", under Major General Noel Mason-MacFarlane, temporarily leaving the division with two brigades, returning on 20 May. After the speed of the German advance, the division, along with the rest of the BEF, was forced to retreat to Dunkirk, and was evacuated from Dunkirk on 31 May/1 June, having suffered significant casualties. Around this time the 42nd Division gained its first and only Victoria Cross (VC) of the Second World War, belonging to Captain Marcus Ervine-Andrews of the 1st Battalion, East Lancashire Regiment, of the 126th Brigade. In addition to being one of the first VCs won by the British Army during the Second World War, he was also the first Irishman to be awarded the medal during the war.

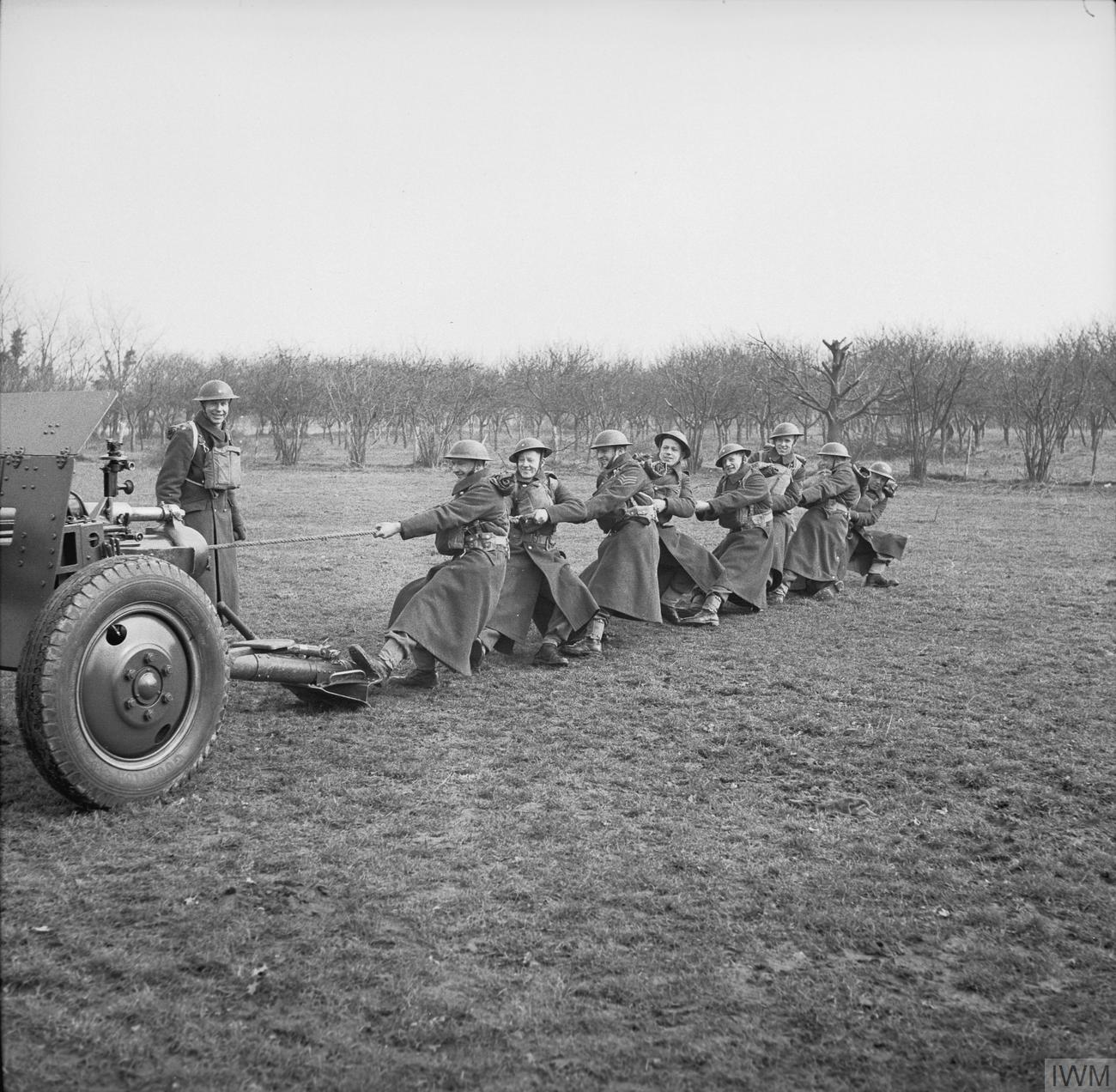
Men from Bolton Wanderers Football Club serving together with a battery of artillery in the 53rd (Bolton) Field Regiment, Royal Artillery, at Beccles, Suffolk on the east coast of England. The photograph, pictured sometime in 1940, shows the nine footballers in uniform pulling an artillery piece.

The next few months for the division were spent in England, being re-equipped and reformed, along with anti-invasion duties in the event of a German invasion. Due to the heavy casualties sustained in France, the division absorbed thousands of conscripts as replacements. The division was stationed initially near Middlesbrough, Yorkshire under Northern Command, and in mid-June Major General Holmes, who had been General Officer Commanding (GOC) for over two years, was given command of X Corps and succeeded as GOC 42nd Division by Major General Henry Willcox. On 4 July, the division came under the command of X Corps and then, on 9 September, moving to East Anglia, IV Corps, commanded by Lieutenant General Francis Nosworthy, under Eastern Command. The corps was intended by General Sir Alan Brooke, the Commander-in-Chief, Home Forces, to be used in a counterattack role if the Germans invaded. On 5 November 1940, the division moved to Gloucestershire upon transferring again, this time to Lieutenant General Hugh Massy's XI Corps, and continued its routine of alternating between beach defence and training for potential future operations overseas. In late April 1941, Major General Eric Miles, who had commanded the 126th Brigade with distinction in France and Belgium the year before, assumed command from Major General Willcox, upon the latter's promotion to command I Corps, and, after further training, which included numerous large-scale exercises, on 23 October, the 42nd Division transferred again to Northern Command and, five days later, Major General Miles Dempsey assumed command from Major General Miles, who was posted to the 56th (London) Infantry Division as its GOC.

Soon afterwards the division was, due to a shortage of armoured troops in the British Army to face a German invasion of the country, selected by General Brooke (soon to become Chief of the Imperial General Staff), as the most senior TA division, and, in his opinion, "a good division" (as he wrote in his diary after having spent the day with the division on 1 July), for conversion into an armoured formation. Consequently, on 1 November, the division was redesignated as the 42nd Armoured Division, the 125th and 126th Brigades becoming the 10th and 11th Armoured Brigades and the 127th Brigade becoming the 42nd Support Group, respectively. Thus, the division ceased to be an infantry formation. However, after undergoing numerous changes in organisation and personnel, the 42nd Armoured Division, after an existence of just less than two years, was broken up, many of its units reconverting to infantry or disbanding.

=== Order of battle ===
The 42nd Infantry Division was constituted as follows during the war:

125th Infantry Brigade

- 1/5th Battalion, Lancashire Fusiliers
- 1/6th Battalion, Lancashire Fusiliers
- 1/8th Battalion, Lancashire Fusiliers (until 4 May 1940)
- 125th Infantry Brigade Anti-Tank Company (formed 31 January 1940, disbanded 25 January 1941)
- 1st Battalion, Border Regiment (from 4 May, left 1 December 1940)
- 9th Battalion, Lancashire Fusiliers (from 1 December 1940)

126th Infantry Brigade

- 5th Battalion, King's Own Royal Regiment (Lancaster)
- 4th Battalion, Border Regiment (until 29 October 1939)
- 5th Battalion, Border Regiment
- 126th Infantry Brigade Anti-Tank Company (formed 20 January 1940, disbanded 21 February 1941)
- 1st Battalion, East Lancashire Regiment (from 10 November 1939 until 25 October 1941)
- 5th Battalion, Manchester Regiment (from 8 September 1941)

127th Infantry Brigade

- 4th Battalion, East Lancashire Regiment (until 22 October 1941)
- 5th Battalion, Manchester Regiment (until 8 September 1941)
- 8th Battalion, Manchester Regiment (until 6 May 1940)
- 127th Infantry Brigade Anti-Tank Company (formed 2 February 1940, disbanded 21 January 1941)
- 1st Battalion, Highland Light Infantry (from 6 May 1940)
- 2nd Battalion, Durham Light Infantry (from 6 September until 19 October 1941)
- 1st Battalion, East Lancashire Regiment (from 25 October 1941)

Divisional Troops

- 42nd (East Lancashire) Divisional Artillery
  - 51st (Westmorland and Cumberland) Field Regiment, Royal Artillery (until 10 April 1940)
  - 52nd (Manchester) Field Regiment, Royal Artillery (until 20 October 1941)
  - 53rd (Bolton) Field Regiment, Royal Artillery (until 20 October 1941)
  - 111th Field Regiment, Royal Artillery (from 3 July 1940)
  - 147th (Essex Yeomanry) Field Regiment, Royal Artillery (from 20 October 1941)
  - 56th (King's Own) Anti-Tank Regiment, Royal Artillery (until 20 October 1941)
  - 53rd (Worcestershire Yeomanry) Anti-Tank Regiment, Royal Artillery (from 20 October 1941)
- 42nd (East Lancashire) Divisional Engineers
  - 200th (East Lancashire) Field Company, Royal Engineers (until 18 October 1939, rejoined 27 April 1940)
  - 201st (East Lancashire) Field Company, Royal Engineers
  - 202nd (East Lancashire) Field Company, Royal Engineers (until 11 April 1940)
  - 250th (East Anglian) Field Company, Royal Engineers (from 14 May 1940)
  - 203rd (East Lancashire) Field Park Company, Royal Engineers
- 42nd (East Lancashire) Infantry Divisional Signals, Royal Corps of Signals

== Post 1945 ==
In 1947, the 42nd and 55th (West Lancashire) Divisions were amalgamated to form the 42nd (Lancashire) Division as part of the post-war Territorial Army. In 1961 the division became a district headquarters as 42nd (Lancashire) Division/District, and it was disbanded on the reduction of the TA into the Territorial and Army Volunteer Reserve on 1 April 1967, when many individual TA units lost their identities. The district headquarters itself formed the core of the structure for the creation of North West District under HQ UK Land Forces in 1972.

In the modern British Army, the 42 North West Brigade has adopted the former 42nd (Lancashire) Division badge.

== Commanders ==
General Officers Commanding have included:

Appointed	General officer commanding
April 1908	Major-General William Fry
October 1910	Major-General Cecil Park
5 May 1913	Major-General William Douglas
24 July 1915	Major-General William Marshall
8 August 1915	Major-General William Douglas
29 December 1915	Brigadier-General Herbert Frith
21 January 1916	Major-General Sir William Douglas
2 March 1917	Brigadier-General Herbert Frith
10 March 1917	Major-General Bertram Mitford
1 October 1917	Brigadier-General William Seymour
15 October 1917	Major-General Arthur Solly-Flood
June 1919	Major-General Herbert Shoubridge
June 1923	Major-General Arthur Solly-Flood
March 1927	Major-General Claude Moore
January 1929	Major-General William Beach
May 1933	Major-General Arthur McNamara
October 1933	Major-General Hugh Elles
March 1934	Major-General Kenneth Buchanan
March 1938	Major-General William Holmes
June 1940	Major-General Henry Willcox
April 1941	Major-General Eric Miles
October 1941	Major-General Miles Dempsey
December 1942	Major-General John Aizlewood
15 January 1947	Major-General Geoffrey Evans
March 1948	Major-General Vyvyan Evelegh
October 1950	Major-General Valentine Blomfield
December 1953	Major-General William Stratton
May 1956	Major-General Thomas Scott
May 1959	Major-General Claude Dunbar
April 1962	Major-General George Lea
December 1963	Major-General Noel Thomas
September 1965	Major-General Bala Bredin

== Memorials and monuments ==
The 42nd Division Memorial stands on the north edge of Trescault village on the left of the road to Havrincourt. It was unveiled by Major-General Arthur Solly-Flood on Easter Sunday, 1922. The inscription reads: "In memory of all ranks of the 42nd East Lancashire Territorial Division who gave their lives for King and Country during the Great War and in commemoration of the attack and capture of the Hindenburg line at Trescault by the Division on 28 September 1918". On the north-east side of Trescault, 274 metres to the east of the monument, is Ribecourt Road Cemetery, which the 42nd Division called the Divisional Cemetery, Trescault.

== Recipients of the Victoria Cross ==
- Lance Sergeant Edward Smith, 1/5th Battalion, Lancashire Fusiliers, Great War
- Lieutenant William Thomas Forshaw, 1/9th Battalion, Manchester Regiment, Great War
- Private Walter Mills, 1/10th Battalion, Manchester Regiment
- Private Alfred Robert Wilkinson, 1/5th Battalion, Manchester Regiment
- 2nd Lieutenant Alfred Victor Smith, 1/5th Battalion, East Lancashire Regiment, Great War
- Captain Marcus Ervine-Andrews, Second World War

== See also ==
- List of British divisions in World War I
- List of British divisions in World War II
- British Army Order of Battle (September 1939)

== Bibliography ==
- Alanbrooke, Field Marshal Lord (2001). Danchev, Alex; Todman, Daniel (eds.). War Diaries 1939–1945. Phoenix Press. ISBN 1-84212-526-5.
- Anon, A History of the East Lancashire Royal Engineers by Members of the Corps, Manchester, 1920/Uckfield: Naval & Military Press, 2003, ISBN 978-1-843426-80-6.
- Bean, C. E. W. (1941). Official History of Australia in the War of 1914–1918. Vol. I (11th ed.).
- Beckett, Ian F. W. (2008). Territorials: A Century of Service. Plymouth: DRA Printing. ISBN 978-0-9557813-1-5.
- Bruce, Anthony (2002). The Last Crusade: The Palestine Campaign in the First World War. London: John Murray. ISBN 978-0-7195-5432-2.
- Carver, Field Marshal Lord (2003). The National Army Museum Book of The Turkish Front 1914–1918: The Campaigns at Gallipoli, in Mesopotamia and in Palestine. London: Pan Macmillan. ISBN 978-0-330-49108-2.
- Farndale, General Sir Martin (1988). History of the Royal Regiment of Artillery. The Forgotten Fronts and the Home Base, 1914–18. London: The Royal Artillery Institution. ISBN 978-1-870114-05-9.
- Gibbon, Frederick (1920). 42nd (East Lancashire) Division 1914–1918. London: Offices of Country Life and George Newnes. OCLC 6132827.
- Gray, Randal (2002) [1991]. Kaiserschlacht 1918: The Final German Offensive. Oxford: Osprey. ISBN 978-1-85532-157-1.
- Hamilton, I. S. M. (1920). Gallipoli Diary. Vol. I. London: Edward Arnold. OCLC 816494856.
- Hill, A. J. (1978). Chauvel of the Light Horse: A Biography of General Sir Harry Chauvel, GCMG, KCB. Carlton, Victoria: Melbourne University Press. ISBN 978-0-522-84146-6.
- Joslen, H. F. (2003) [1960]. Orders of Battle: Second World War, 1939–1945. Uckfield, East Sussex: Naval and Military Press. ISBN 978-1-84342-474-1.
- Keogh, E. G. (1955). Suez to Aleppo. Melbourne: Directorate of Military Training. OCLC 220029983.
- Kinloch, Terry (2007). Devils on Horses: in the words of the Anzacs in the Middle East 1916–19. Auckland: Exisle Publishing. ISBN 978-0-908988-94-5.
- Powles, C. Guy (1922). The New Zealanders in Sinai and Palestine. Official History New Zealand's Effort in the Great War. Vol. III. Auckland, Christchurch, Dunedin and Wellington: Whitcombe & Tombs. OCLC 2959465.
- Simpson-Baikie, Hugh (1920). "Statement on Artillery by Brigadier General Sir Hugh Simpson Baikie, Ex-Commander of the British Artilley at Cape Helles". Gallipoli Diary. By Hamilton, I. S. M. Vol. II. London: Edward Arnold. OCLC 816494856.
- Watson, Graham E.; Rinaldi, Richard A. (2018). The Corps of Royal Engineers: Organization and Units 1889–2018. Tiger Lily Books. ISBN 978-171790180-4.
- Wavell, Field Marshal Earl (1968) [1933]. "The Palestine Campaigns". In Sheppard, Eric William (ed.). A Short History of the British Army (4th ed.). London: Constable & Co. OCLC 35621223.
- Westlake, Ray (1992). British Territorial Units 1914–18. Men-at-Arms Series. Vol. 245. Osprey. ISBN 978-1-85532-168-7.
- Westlake, Ray (2011). The Territorials, 1908–1914: A Guide for Military and Family Historians. Pen & Sword. ISBN 978-1848843608.
- Woodward, David R. (2006). Hell in the Holy Land: World War I in the Middle East. Lexington: University Press of Kentucky. ISBN 978-0-8131-2383-7.
