= Herbert Shoubridge =

British Army general (1871–1923)

Major-General Herbert Shoubridge CB CMG DSO
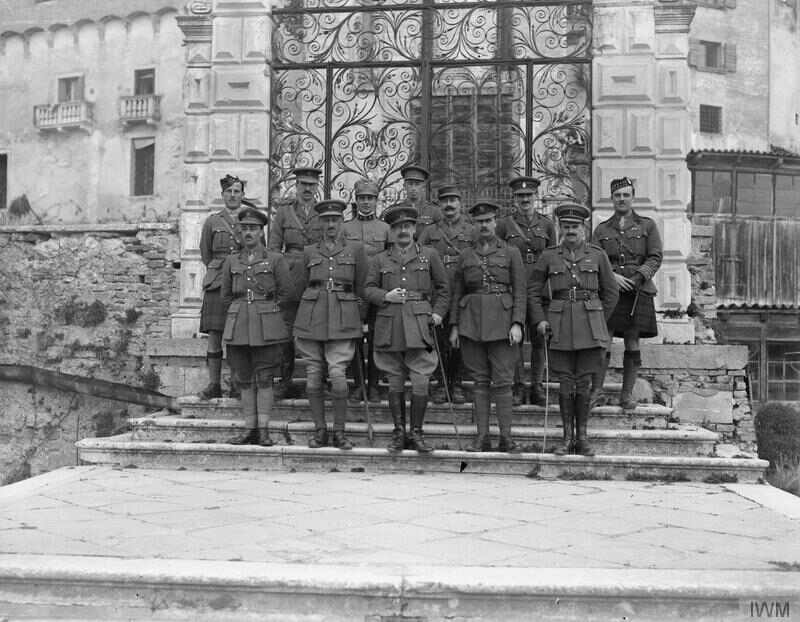
- Shoubridge (centre, front), GOC 7th Division, and his staff, standing on the steps of his headquarters, Italy, 1918
- Born: 15 June 1871; Hythe, Kent, England
- Died: 27 October 1923 (aged 52); Camberley, Surrey, England
- Military career
- Allegiance: United Kingdom
- Branch: British Army
- Service years: 1893–1923
- Rank: Major-General
- Units: Suffolk Regiment; Dorset Regiment; Northumberland Fusiliers
- Commands: 54th Infantry Brigade; 7th Division; 42nd (East Lancashire) Division; Royal Military College, Sandhurst
- Conflicts: Tirah expedition Second Boer War; World War I
- Awards: Companion of the Order of the Bath; Companion of the Order of St Michael and St George; Distinguished Service Order

Major-General Thomas Herbert Shoubridge CB CMG DSO (15 June 1871 – 27 October 1923) was a British Army officer who became commandant of the Royal Military College, Sandhurst.

== Military career ==
Shoubridge was commissioned as a second lieutenant into the 4th (Militia) Battalion of the Suffolk Regiment on 4 February 1891. Two years later, however, he transferred to the Dorset Regiment as a second lieutenant on 5 March 1893. He was promoted to lieutenant on 18 June 1896, and took part in the Tirah expedition to the North West Frontier of India in 1897. Following the outbreak of the Second Boer War in late 1899, he became deputy assistant adjutant general for the Natal Army. He transferred to the Northumberland Fusiliers and was promoted captain on 9 May 1900, and received a brevet promotion as major dated 29 November 1900 in the South African Honours list of 1901.

After the war ended in June 1902, he became Deputy Assistant Quartermaster General at Headquarters, South Africa Command. Promoted in June 1905 to captain, he was seconded for service on the staff on 1 November 1906 and appointed brigade major of the 13th Infantry Brigade. He then served as a general staff officer (GSO) with Western Command and then Southern Command. On 5 September 1912 he was seconded from his regiment in order to serve on the staff and was appointed as a GSO2.

He was promoted to brevet lieutenant colonel in February 1914, while serving as a GSO2 with the West Lancashire Division of the Territorial Force (TF).

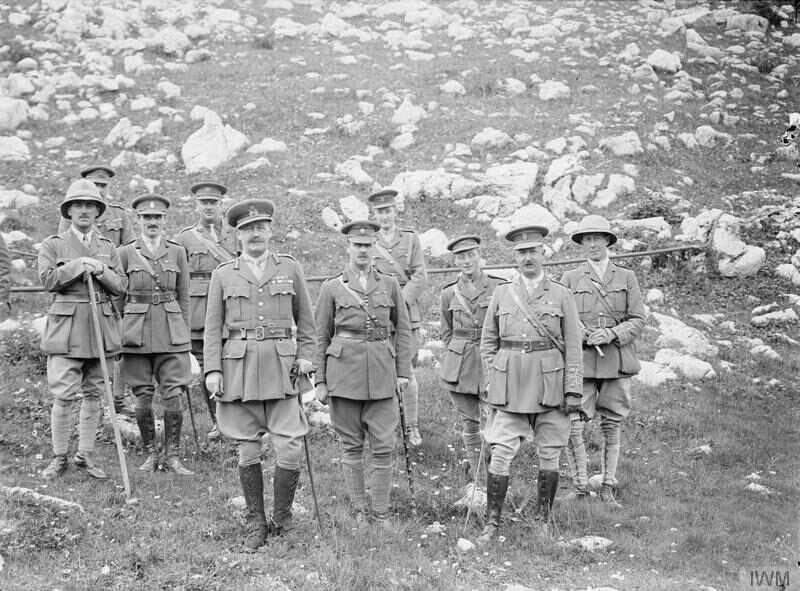
Major-General Herbert Shoubridge, GOC of the 7th Division (fifth from the left), and his staff.

He fought in World War I, receiving promotion to major in September 1914, as assistant adjutant and quartermaster general for 2nd Army Corps on the Western Front from 1914 and as assistant adjutant and quartermaster general for 4th Army Corps from October 1914. In March 1915 he was appointed as GSO1 of the 18th (Eastern) Division. In December he was promoted to temporary brigadier general and succeeded William Heneker in command of the 54th Infantry Brigade, part of the 18th (Eastern) Division, in France later that year. After receiving a promotion to brevet colonel in January 1917 he then went on to be general officer commanding (GOC) of the 7th Division in April 1917, shortly after having received promotion to temporary major general in late March. Towards the end of the year he and his division were sent to the Italian Front, where it remained for the rest of the war.

With the war now over and his division disbanded, Shoubridge, who in January 1919 was promoted to substantive major general, received a new appointment as GOC of the 42nd (East Lancashire) Infantry Division from 1919 and was then briefly commandant of the Royal Military College Sandhurst in July 1923 before his resignation due to ill health. He lived at Lawrenny Castle near Kilgetty in Pembrokeshire.

== Family ==
In 1910 he married Constance Gladys Dugdale; they had a daughter and a son.

Military offices
Preceded by George Barrow	GOC 7th Division; 1917–1919	Succeeded by Post disbanded
Preceded by Arthur Solly-Flood	GOC 42nd (East Lancashire) Infantry Division; 1919–1923	Succeeded by Arthur Solly-Flood
Preceded by Reginald Stephens	Commandant of the Royal Military College, Sandhurst; 1923	Succeeded by Charles Corkran
