= Bertram Mitford (British Army officer) =

British Army officer

Major-General Bertram Mitford CB CMG DSO
- Born: 6 February 1863; Anderston, Scotland
- Died: 23 February 1936 (aged 73)
- Military career
- Allegiance: United Kingdom
- Branch: British Army
- Service years: 1882-1918
- Rank: Major-General
- Commands: 6th Infantry Brigade; 9th Infantry Brigade; 72nd Infantry Brigade; 42nd (East Lancashire) Infantry Division
- Conflicts: Dongola Campaign; Second Boer War; First World War
- Awards: Companion of the Order of the Bath; Companion of the Order of St Michael and St George; Distinguished Service Order

Major-General Bertram Reveley Mitford, CB, CMG, DSO (6 February 1863 – 23 February 1936) was a British Army officer.

== Military career ==
Mitford was commissioned into the Buffs (East Kent Regiment) (later the Buffs (Royal East Kent Regiment)) in September 1882. He was seconded for service with the Egyptian Army in August 1886. He was transferred as a captain to the East Surrey Regiment in June 1891. He attended the Staff College, Camberley, from 1893 to 1894. and served as a deputy assistant adjutant general in September 1897 and was made a brevet colonel in November 1898.

After seeing action in the Dongola campaign, he went to South Africa during the Second Boer War. He was appointed a Companion of the Distinguished Service Order in April 1901. He had served as a staff officer, graded as an assistant adjutant general, to a column of mounted infantry, in January 1901, holding the local rank of lieutenant colonel while in his position.

Following the end of this war in June 1902, he stayed on as assistant adjutant-general to the Forces in South Africa, stationed in the Pretoria district.

He was promoted to major in June 1903 and was placed on half-pay in July 1906. He was promoted to the temporary rank of brigadier general and succeeded Colonel Edward Stevenson Browne as commander of the 6th Infantry Brigade in December 1906. He then became commander of the 9th Infantry Brigade in May 1907 and was made a Companion of the Order of the Bath in the 1907 Birthday Honours in June.

He commanded the brigade until April 1910 when he relinquished his rank of brigadier general and retired from the army. In February 1912, however, he was granted the honorary rank of brigadier general.

He was recalled for service during the First World War, going on to command the 72nd Infantry Brigade in September 1914 and deploying to the Western Front with his brigade, which formed part of the 24th Division, where he took part at the Battle of Loos in September 1915 and the Battle of the Somme in the summer of 1916. He then became general officer commanding of the 42nd (East Lancashire) Division in March 1917, when he was promoted to temporary major general, again on the Western Front, and took part in the Battle of Passchendaele in the autumn of 1917. He handed over his command in October. Having been made a CMG in June that year, he was promoted to the honorary rank of major general in February 1918.

== Bibliography ==
- Michael Lucas. The Real "General Mitford". The Royal Saxon Army.

Military offices
Preceded by William Douglas	GOC 42nd (East Lancashire) Infantry Division; March 1917 – October 1917	Succeeded by Arthur Solly-Flood
