= Arthur Solly-Flood =

British Army officer

Major-General Arthur Solly-Flood CB CMG DSO
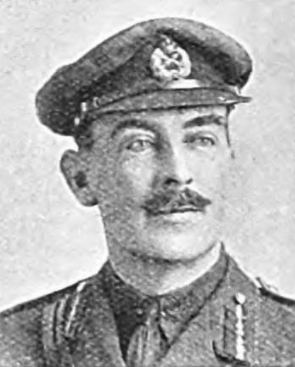
- Born: 28 January 1871; Southsea, Hampshire, England
- Died: December 1940 (aged 69); Crickhowell, Wales
- Military career
- Allegiance: United Kingdom
- Branch: British Army
- Service years: 1891−1931
- Rank: Major-General
- Service number: 10670
- Units: South Lancashire Regiment; 4th Royal Irish Dragoon Guards
- Commands: 4th Royal Irish Dragoon Guards; 35th Brigade; 42nd (East Lancashire) Division
- Conflicts: Second Boer War; First World War
- Awards: Companion of the Order of the Bath; Companion of the Order of St Michael and St George; Distinguished Service Order

Major-General Arthur Solly-Flood, CB, CMG, DSO (28 January 1871 − December 1940) was a British Army officer.

== Military career ==
Born the son of Major-General Sir Frederick Solly-Flood and Constance Eliza Frere, Arthur Solly-Flood was educated at Wellington College, Berkshire and the Royal Military College, Sandhurst. He was commissioned into the South Lancashire Regiment as a second lieutenant on 25 March 1891, and promoted to lieutenant on 12 January 1894.

He saw action in the Second Boer War, where he was promoted to captain on 28 February 1900, and served as adjutant of the South African Light Horse. For his service, he was appointed a Companion of the Distinguished Service Order (DSO) in April 1901.

He was a general staff officer, grade 2 (GSO2), in succession to Reginald Hoskins.

He became commanding officer of the 4th Royal Irish Dragoon Guards and, in that role, deployed to the Western Front during the First World War. Promoted in February 1915 to brevet lieutenant colonel, he went on to be commander of the 12th (Eastern) Division's 35th Infantry Brigade during the Battle of the Somme in autumn 1916, Director-General of Training for the British Expeditionary Force (BEF) in January 1917 the same month in which he was advanced to brevet colonel, and, after being made a temporary major general in October 1917, General Officer Commanding (GOC) of the 42nd (East Lancashire) Infantry Division in October 1917.

With the war now over, he handed over his command in June 1919, when he was promoted to the permanent rank of major general, and became Military Adviser in Ireland in April 1922. He returned to the command of 42nd (East Lancashire) Infantry Division in June 1923 and then served as Major-General, Cavalry from November 1927 until he retired in February 1931.

He was appointed a Companion of the Order of the Bath in the 1919 New Year Honours.

He was colonel of the 4th/7th Dragoon Guards from 3 November 1930 to 1940.

Military offices
Preceded by Bertram Mitford	GOC 42nd (East Lancashire) Division; 1917–1919	Succeeded by Herbert Shoubridge
Preceded by Herbert Shoubridge	GOC 42nd (East Lancashire) Division; 1923–1927	Succeeded by Claude Moore
Honorary titles
Preceded by Sir Henry Ewart	Colonel of the 4th/7th Dragoon Guards; 1930–1940	Succeeded by Adrian Carton de Wiart
