= Cumberland Artillery =

Cumberland Artillery IV East Lancashire Brigade, RFA, (The Cumberland Artillery)
- Active: 7 May 1860–26 December 1916
- Country: United Kingdom
- Branch: Volunteer Force/Territorial Force
- Role: Garrison artillery Field artillery
- Part of: 42nd (East Lancashire) Division
- Garrison/HQ: Carlisle; Workington
- March: D'ye ken John Peel?
- Engagements: Gallipoli; Defence of Suez Canal

The Cumberland Artillery was a group of Volunteer artillery batteries formed in the county of Cumberland, England, in 1860. They became part of the Royal Garrison Artillery, and when the Territorial Force was created in 1908 they formed a Royal Field Artillery howitzer brigade for the East Lancashire Division. In World War I the brigade served at Gallipoli and in Egypt, then was broken up amongst the divisional artillery: its batteries fought on the Western Front for the rest of the war. In the 1920s the Cumberland Artillery batteries combined with the Westmorland and Cumberland Yeomanry to form a new field regiment of the Royal Artillery that saw considerable action in World War II.

== Volunteer Force ==
The enthusiasm for the Volunteer movement following an invasion scare in 1859 saw the creation of many Rifle and Artillery Volunteer Corps composed of part-time soldiers eager to supplement the Regular British Army in time of need. Five Artillery Volunteer Corps (AVCs) were quickly formed in Cumberland:

- 1st (Whitehaven) Cumberland AVC formed on 7 May 1860
- 2nd (Carlisle) Cumberland AVC formed on 15 February 1860, second battery formed April 1860
- 3rd (Maryport) Cumberland AVC formed on 28 April 1860
- 4th (Workington) Cumberland AVC formed on 5 March 1860, disbanded January 1866
- 5th (Harrington) Cumberland AVC formed as a section on 11 May 1860, disbanded May 1876

In the absence of support from the War Office, the corps selected their own uniforms and elected their officers. From 10 July 1860 these independent corps were attached to the 1st Administrative Brigade, Cumberland Artillery Volunteers, based at Carlisle under the command of Major Thomas Salkeld, a former lieutenant in the 11th Hussars. The 1st Cumberland Engineer Volunteer Corps at Cockermouth, formed on 17 September 1861, was also attached to the administrative brigade from August 1862 until its disbandment in May 1864.

The 4th and 5th AVCs established an armoury at the old chapel on the coast known as Howe Michael and practised with two 6-pounder field guns brought from Whitehaven Castle and later with two 32-pounder smoothbore guns. In 1865 the 2nd AVC received two 9-pounder rifled muzzle-loading (RML) field guns, which were kept at Carlisle Castle and trained with them as a horse-drawn battery until 1871. Some AVCs around the country later established semi-mobile 'position batteries' of 40-pounders to operate alongside the volunteer infantry brigades, but the Cumberland Artillery was refused these, and continued as garrison artillery, training on coastal defence guns. Later, when the corps was offered 40-pdrs, and afterwards a four-gun battery of RML 16-pounders in 1889. it turned them down.

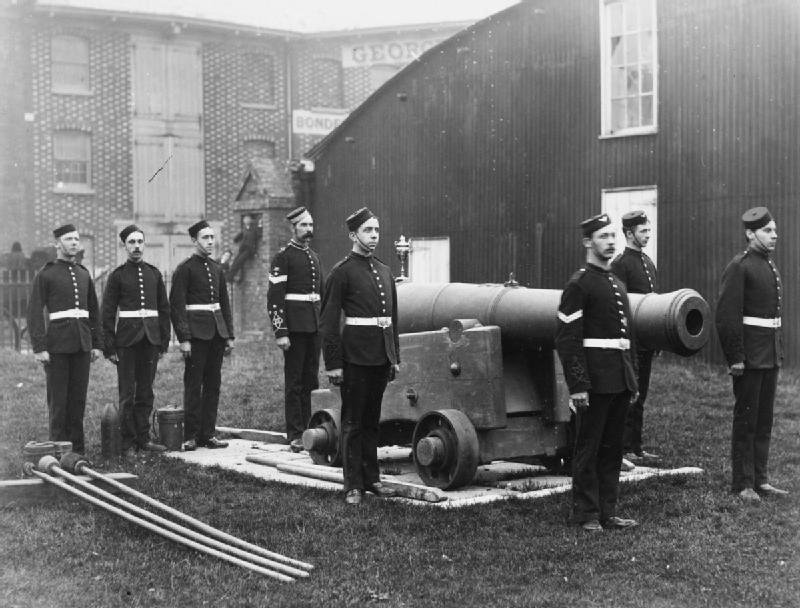
Volunteer artillery drilling with a 64-pounder RML gun in the 1890s.

On 15 May 1880 the admin brigade was consolidated as the 1st Cumberland Artillery Volunteers with four batteries, later augmented to seven:

- Headquarters (HQ) at Carlisle
- No 1 Battery at Whitehaven from 1st AVC
- No 2 Battery at Carlisle from 2nd AVC
- No 3 Battery at Maryport from 3rd AVC
- No 4 Battery at Carlisle from 2nd AVC
- No 5 Battery at Workington formed on 26 May 1883
- No 6 Battery at Silloth formed on 3 May 1884
- No 7 Battery at Workington formed on 23 June 1886

The increase in companies entitled the corps to a lieutenant-colonel in command from 1884. The new battery at Silloth had two 64-pounder guns in the Proof Works of Armstrong Mitchell's engineering works.

Cap badge of the Royal Regiment of Artillery.

The last smoothbore guns were withdrawn from the practice batteries at Whitehaven and Maryport in 1891 and replaced with RML 64-pounders. In 1893 the corps received its first breechloading gun, an RBL 40-pounder at Carlisle. In 1897–8 the corps introduced an ambulance detachment and a signal section. During the Second Boer War over 200 officers and men of the corps volunteered for active service, and over 60 more for home service. These offers were not accepted, but 18 members of the Cumberland Artillery did serve in South Africa in the Regulars, the Imperial Yeomanry or colonial units.

The 1st Cumberland was included in the Northern Division of the Royal Artillery (RA) from 1 April 1882, transferring to the Southern Division when the Northern Division was abolished on 1 July 1889. On 1 June 1899 all the Volunteer artillery units became part of the Royal Garrison Artillery (RGA) and with the abolition of the RA's divisional organisation on 1 January 1902, the unit became the 1st Cumberland RGA (Volunteers). In 1901 the corps opened the first drill hall that it owned outright, at Edkin Street, Workington. Its HQ was at Artillery Hall, Albert Street, Carlisle.

== Territorial Force ==
When the Volunteers were subsumed into the new Territorial Force (TF) under the Haldane Reforms of 1908, the 1st Cumberland RGA (V) became the IV (or 4th) East Lancashire (Howitzer) Brigade, Royal Field Artillery and it gained the subtitle The Cumberland Artillery the following year.

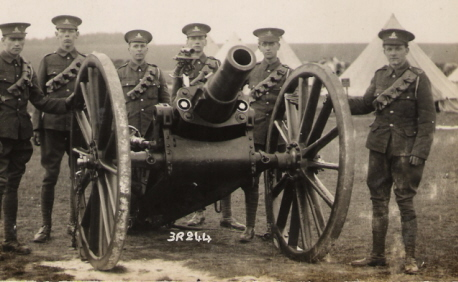
Territorial gunners training with a 5-inch howitzer before World War I.

- Brigade HQ at Edkin Street Drill Hall, Workington
- 1st Cumberland Battery (Howitzer) at Carlisle
- 2nd Cumberland Battery (Howitzer) at Workington
- 4th East Lancashire Ammunition Column at Workington, Right Section at 51 Curzon Street, Maryport

The brigade formed part of the divisional artillery for the TF's East Lancashire Division. Before World War I broke out, the brigade was equipped with four 5-inch howitzers to each battery, and commanded by Lt-Col J.H. Dudgeon, VD.

== World War I ==
=== Mobilisation ===
Units of the East Lancashire Division had been on their annual training when war came: on 3 August they were recalled to their drill halls and at 17.30 next day the order to mobilise was received. The men were billeted within reach of their drill halls while the mobilisation process went on.

On 10 August, TF units were invited to volunteer for Overseas Service. The infantry brigades of the East Lancashire Division volunteered by 12 August and soon 90 per cent of the division had signed up. On 15 August 1914, the War Office issued instructions to separate those men who had opted for Home Service only, and form these into reserve units. On 31 August, the formation of a reserve or 2nd Line unit was authorised for each 1st Line unit where 60 per cent or more of the men had volunteered for Overseas Service. The titles of these 2nd Line units would be the same as the original, but distinguished by a '2/' prefix and would absorb the flood of volunteers coming forwards. In this way duplicate batteries, brigades and divisions were created, mirroring those TF formations being sent overseas.

=== 1/IV East Lancashire Brigade, RFA ===
On 20 August the East Lancashire Division moved into camps around Bolton, Bury and Rochdale, and on 5 September it received orders to go to Egypt to complete its training and relieve Regular units from the garrison for service on the Western Front. It embarked on a convoy of troopships from Southampton on 10 September, and landed at Alexandria on 25 September, the first TF division to go overseas. However, only two brigades of its divisional artillery accompanied it, and 1/IV East Lancs was one of those left behind. On 10 October the brigade moved, with its 2nd Line recruits, to Crownhill Fort, Devon, and then on 17 November it went to Newcastle upon Tyne to continue its training.

Formation sign of 42nd (East Lancashire) Division.

1/IV East Lancs Bde did not reach Alexandria until 14 June 1915, by which time the rest of the East Lancashire Division (now designated 42nd (East Lancashire) Division) had been landed at Cape Helles on the Gallipoli Peninsula and taken part in the Second and Third Battles of Krithia. From Alexandria the brigade (without its ammunition column) landed at Helles between 9 and 11 August 1915 where the division had just fought the bloody Battle of Krithia Vineyard. After a short period in reserve, 42nd (EL) Division then spent the following months engaged in Trench warfare, suffering from sickness, and then from bad weather as winter set in.

Between 27 and 31 December the exhausted infantry of 42nd (EL) Division were evacuated from Helles to Mudros, but the divisional artillery stayed behind, supporting 13th (Western) Division. The last Turkish attack at Helles was beaten off on 7 January 1916, but a full evacuation was already under way. As 13th (W) Division's modern guns were withdrawn, they were replaced with the old ones of 42nd (EL) Division, so that fire was maintained without obvious slackening. Finally, those old guns that could not be got away were destroyed, and 13th (W) Division was evacuated to Mudros on the night of 8/9 January.

=== CCXIII Brigade, RFA ===
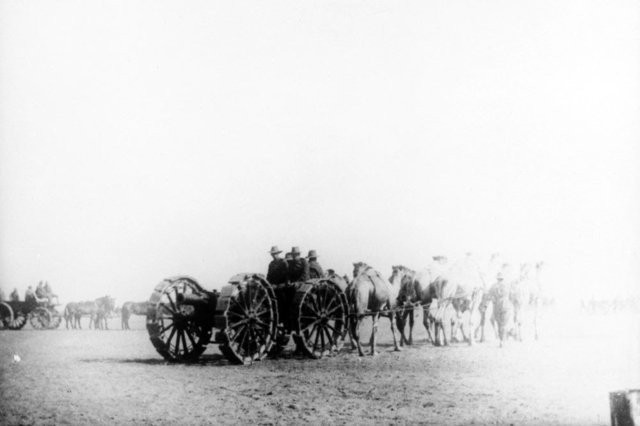
4.5-inch Howitzer with 'ped-rails' (sand tyres) around wheels, used in desert conditions.

42nd (EL) Division was then sent from Mudros back to Egypt, the bulk of the RFA embarking on 14 January in a storm. The division concentrated at Mena Camp on 22 January before moving into southern sector of the Suez Canal defences. Once back in Egypt 1/IV East Lancs Bde was reunited with its ammunition column. On 31 May 1916 1/IV East Lancs Bde was numbered CCXIII (213) Brigade, RFA, and the howitzer batteries designated A (H) and B (H). In the summer they were rearmed with modern 4.5-inch howitzers.

The canal defences were situated east of the waterway, with a string of self-contained posts, each garrisoned by an infantry battalion and an artillery battery. The division did out much of the construction and trained in the desert, the gunners carrying out field firing with their new guns. The gun wheels were fitted with 'ped-rails' to assist movement across soft sand, for which 12 rather than 6 horses were harnessed to gun-carriages and limbers. In late July the division was ordered north, where a Turkish column was advancing on the defences. This column was defeated at the Battle of Romani near Pelusium on 4–5 August, after which 42nd (EL) Division set off in pursuit. The men and horses suffered badly from lack of water, but the Turks lost heavily. The division then returned to the Romani and Pelusium area by 15 August, with the bulk of the artillery and ammunition columns at Kantara and Ballah.

The policy now was to distribute the howitzer batteries among the field gun brigades of divisional artillery. CCXIII Brigade was thus broken up on 26 December 1916: A Bty became C (H) (later D (H)) Bty of CCXI (1/II East Lancashire) Bde and B Bty became C (H) (later D (H)) Bty of CCX (1/I East Lancashire) Bde.

In January 1917 42nd (EL) Division was ordered to the Western Front and it embarked in February. The two Cumberland batteries fought with their new brigades in 42nd (EL) Division for the rest of the war on the Western Front, including the operations on the Flanders coast in 1917, the defence against the German Spring Offensive in March 1918, and the Allies' final Hundred Days Offensive.

=== 2/IV East Lancashire Brigade, RFA ===
Formation sign of 66th (2nd East Lancashire) Division.

The 2nd Line units of the East Lancashire Division were raised in September and October 1914, with only a small nucleus of instructors to train the mass of volunteers. 2/IV East Lancs (H) Bde was quickly formed with 2/1st and 2/2nd Cumberland (H) Btys, and on 10 October accompanied 1/IV East Lancs Bde to Crownhill Fort, where it remained for the rest of the year. Trainining was slow because the 2nd Line artillery lacked guns, sights, horses, wagons and signal equipment.

On 10 February 1915 the brigade went to Southport in Lancashire, then on 23 May to East Grinstead in Sussex. Here it received its first two guns (two old 5-inch howitzers) and limbers on 3 June. The 2nd East Lancashire Division, now numbered 66th (2nd EL) Division, began concentrating in Kent and Sussex in August 1915, and 2/IV East Lancs Bde took up its war station at Plaw Hatch, near Forest Row. At the turn of the year the brigade was issued with modern 4.5-inch howitzers and in early 1916 the division moved into the East Coast defences, with its artillery at Colchester. However, on 4 May 2/IV East Lancs Bde was broken up before receiving a number. The two batteries became D (H)/CCCXXXI (2/II East Lancs) and D (H)/CCCXXXII (2/III East Lancs).

After long delays caused by having to find reinforcement drafts for 42nd (EL) Division, 66th (2nd EL) Division was finally ready for overseas serve. The two Cumberland batteries served with their new brigades on the Western Front, at the Battle of Poelcappelle in October 1917 and against the German Spring Offensive. 66th (2nd EL) Division was withdrawn from the front line after the Spring Offensive, but despite their losses the divisional artillery remained in action throughout 1918 until the Armistice with Germany.

== Postwar ==
When the TF was reconstituted on 7 February 1920, the 1st and 2nd Cumberland batteries were reformed, but now numbered 15 and 16 as part of the 1st East Lancashire Brigade. After the TF was reorganised as the Territorial Army (TA) in 1921, this became 51st (East Lancashire and Cumberland) Brigade with the two Cumberland batteries numbered 203 and 204. Then in June 1922 the brigade transferred its number and the two Cumberland batteries to 93rd (Westmorland & Cumberland) Bde, which had been created by the postwar conversion of the Westmorland and Cumberland Yeomanry from cavalry to field artillery. The new 51st (Westmorland & Cumberland) Bde consisted of 203 and 204 (Cumberland) Btys together with two Yeomanry batteries. Just before World War II it split into two regiments. 203 (Cumberland) Battery served independently in the Norwegian Campaign, then with 51st (W&C) Regiment in North Africa, including the Siege of Tobruk, and finally as part of a 'Chindit' long range penetration infantry column in Burma. After the war the successor units were finally merged into the Border Regiment by 1967.

== Insignia ==
The batteries of the IV East Lancashire Bde, RFA (TF), wore a brass shoulder title with 'T' over 'RFA' over 'CUMBERLAND', while the ammunition column carried the same 'T' over 'RFA' over 'E. LANCASHIRE' worn by the rest of the 42nd (EL) Divisional Artillery.

== Commanders ==
=== Honorary Colonel ===
When the Cumberland Artillery was first formed, the Lord Lieutenant of Cumberland (a position often held by the Earls of Lonsdale) was recognised as the unit's Honorary Colonel ex officio. Hugh Lowther, 5th Earl of Lonsdale, was appointed Hon Col of the Cumberland Artillery on 20 December 1884, and continued in the position with the IV East Lancashire Brigade. He was also Hon Col of the Westmorland & Cumberland Yeomanry, and continued in the role with the combined 51st (W&C) Brigade until 1937.

=== Commanding officers ===
The following officers commanded the Cumberland Artillery and IV East Lancashire Brigade:

- Maj Thomas Salkeld, appointed 10 July 1860, resigned 11 July 1877
- Maj Wilton W. Wood, promoted 11 July 1877 (promoted Lt-Col 16 May 1884), resigned 2 July 1887
- Lt-Col Charles Armstrong, promoted 2 July 1887, resigned 25 April 1888
- Lt-Col Tom G. Godding, promoted 26 April 1888, resigned 29 September 1891
- Lt-Col William Henry Atkinson, promoted 24 October 1891, resigned 12 December 1899
- Lt-Col Ernest A. Thompson, promoted 6 January 1900
- Lt-Col David Main, promoted 8 March 1905
- Lt-Col J.H. Dudgeon, VD, promoted 9 March 1910
