= 107th Regiment Royal Armoured Corps =

WW2 British Army tank unit

107th Regiment Royal Armoured Corps (King's Own)
- Active: 1941–1945
- Disbanded: 1945
- Allegiance: United Kingdom
- Branch: British Army
- Type: Armoured
- Role: Infantry Support
- Size: Regiment
- Part of: Royal Armoured Corps
- Equipment: Valentine tank Churchill tank

The 107th Regiment Royal Armoured Corps (King's Own) (107 RAC) was a tank regiment of the Royal Armoured Corps, raised by the British Army during the Second World War. The regiment served with distinction in North-west Europe from July 1944 to May 1945.

== Origin ==
107th Regiment RAC was formed on 1 November 1941 by the conversion to the armoured role of the 5th Battalion, King's Own Royal Regiment (Lancaster), a 1st Line Territorial Army infantry battalion. In common with other infantry units transferred to the Royal Armoured Corps, all personnel would have continued to wear their King's Own cap badge on the black beret of the RAC. In this instance, however, the brass cap badges of the King's Own Royal Regiment (Lancaster) were plated white metal, chrome or silver by the Royal Electrical and Mechanical Engineers.

The 5th Battalion, King's Own Royal Regiment had been serving in 126th Infantry Brigade of 42nd (East Lancashire) Infantry Division, which had fought in France and been evacuated at Dunkirk in May 1940. Later, these formations were redesignated 11th Armoured Brigade (later 11th Tank Brigade) and 42nd Armoured Division respectively. Serving alongside the regiment in the brigade were 110 RAC (previously 5th Borders) and 111 RAC (5th Manchesters). Based in Yorkshire (mainly at Keighley and later Leyburn), the regiment trained on Valentine tanks throughout 1942 and early 1943.

== Training ==
In January 1943, 11th Tank Brigade was attached to 77th Infantry (Reserve) Division and given the role of holding and training replacements. Consequently, 107 RAC became an advanced training regiment, taking in men who had completed individual training at the training regiments, forming them into crews with responsibility for their own tanks, and instructing them in troop and finally squadron tactics. The regiment moved to Otley, re-equipped with Churchill tanks and trained its crews (about 24 at a time) on the nearby moors.

== Disbandment and Re-creation ==
In Autumn 1943, the decision was made to disband 11th Tank Brigade, without it ever having seen active service, and, on 8 September, 107 RAC was ordered to disperse. Most of the regiment's personnel were transferred to other RAC regiments, and disbandment was completed on 31 December. A 'token party' of three officers and 47 other ranks from 107 RAC was sent to 151st Regiment Royal Armoured Corps – which had been converted from the 10th Battalion, King's Own Royal Regiment, a hostilities-only unit created in 1940.

The 151st Regiment RAC formed part of 34th Tank Brigade, which also included 147 RAC (formerly 9th Hampshire Regiment) and 153 RAC (formerly 8th Essex Regiment). The brigade was based at Folkestone in Kent, and also equipped with Churchills. On 30 December 1943, 151 RAC formally disbanded in order to adopt the number of 107 RAC – thus perpetuating the link with the 5th Battalion, King's Own Royal Regiment, a permanent '1st Line' Territorial Army battalion as opposed to the 'hostilities-only' 10th Battalion that had been converted to 151 RAC.

== Normandy ==
At the beginning of July 1944, 107 RAC embarked at Gosport for Normandy with the rest of 34th Tank Brigade Fighting in the Normandy Campaign as an independent brigade under 21st Army Group command, it could be assigned to support any infantry division that required the assistance of tanks, its regiments usually split up to form brigade groups with the infantry.

107 RAC went into action on 15 July during Operation Greenline, part of the Second Battle of the Odon, designed to pin German forces so that they could not interfere with the planned breakout from the Normandy beachhead (codenamed Operation Cobra). The regiment supported 15th (Scottish) Division in a night attack towards Evreux. 107 RAC's War Diary records that 'the attack from the inf. point of view was a complete success', but complains that the regiment's tanks were blinded by the 'excellent' smoke laid down by the artillery and infantry, and were late withdrawing the following day. The regiment had lost six tanks, with six men killed, seven wounded, and one missing. On 22 July 107 RAC supported troops of 53rd (Welsh) Division in a raid, and then went to support 59th (Staffordshire) Division in case of counter-attack.

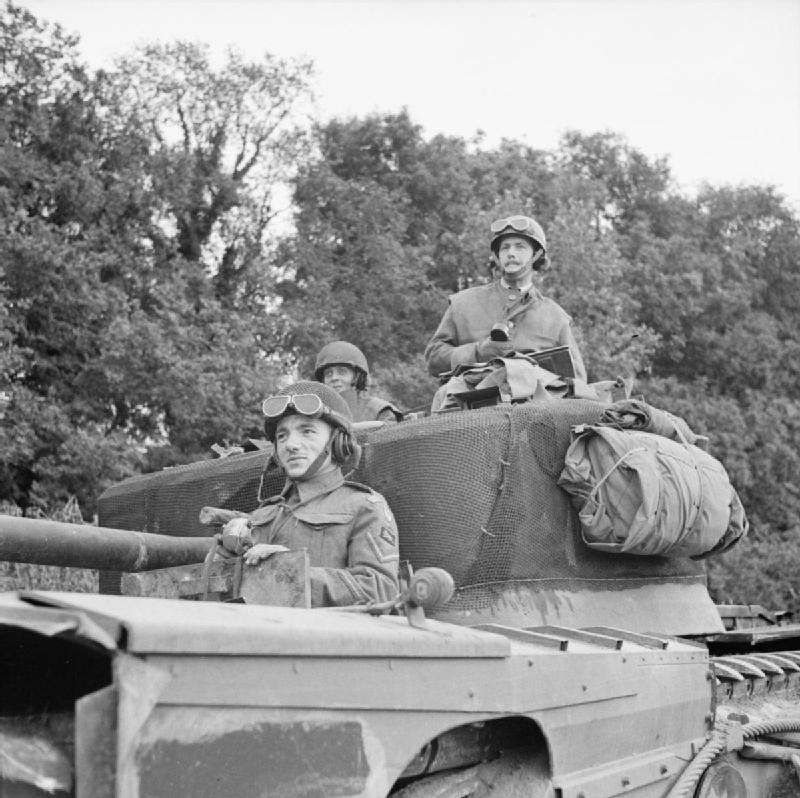
Lt Fathergill, OC 'B' Squadron, 107 RAC, 34th Tank Brigade, with his crew on their Churchill tank, 17 July 1944.

On 7 August 107 RAC moved up in support of 176th Brigade of 59th Division who had established a bridgehead across the River Orne. A Squadron managed to ford the river, followed by C Sqn. The Germans put in a vigorous counter-attack and some of the British infantry withdrew, leaving 107 RAC's two forward squadrons exposed to attacks by Tiger and Panther tanks. Despite heavy casualties, the bridgehead was held, but 107's shattered squadrons had to be reformed as a single composite squadron until the regiment could be withdrawn from the line on 19 August.

Out of the line to reorganise, the regiment received the whole of C Squadron of 153 RAC, which was being broken up to provide replacements, due to a shortage of manpower. This became a new C Squadron for 107 RAC.

By early September, the regiment was sufficiently reorganised to take part in Operation Astonia, the attack on Le Havre. On 11 September, 107 RAC attacked in support of 147th Brigade of 49th (West Riding) Division, attacking the high ground on the North East side of the port. The tanks picked their way through lanes cut through the minefields by flail tanks and went on to assist the infantry in mopping up machine gun positions and (with some Churchill Crocodile flamethrowers under command) to clear buildings. The following day, 107 RAC's tanks took up hull-down positions on the high ground and gave fire support to the infantry advance on the town, which fell later that day.

== Clarkeforce ==
107 RAC was back in the line in early October, supporting small-scale infantry operations and standing ready to counter-attack if called upon. On 18 October, it became part of 'Clarkeforce', a mobile column commanded by Brigadier W.S. Clarke of 34th Tank Brigade. As part of operations on the Belgian–Dutch border to clear the approaches to the port of Antwerp, 49 Division was to attack towards Loenhout, and then unleash Clarkeforce to exploit the breakthrough and move up the main road to Wuustwezel (Operation Rebound).

Clarkeforce was launched at 16.00 on 20 October as part of a large offensive - Operation Pheasant which was designed to liberate much of North Brabant. The Churchills of 107 RAC's C Sqn carried D Company of the 1st Battalion, Leicestershire Regiment, and the regiment was accompanied by a troop of Achilles self-propelled 17-pounders from 248 Battery, 62nd (6th London) Anti-Tank Regiment, Royal Artillery, and a troop of Churchill Crocodile flamethrowing tanks of the 1st Fife and Forfar Yeomanry. Fire support was provided by 191st (Hertfordshire and Essex Yeomanry) Field Regiment, Royal Artillery. Progress was not fast: the column was restricted to one tank's width, and the M3 Stuart ('Honey') light tanks of 107's Recce Troop were held up by the bad tank going, but the leading squadrons moved on in the approaching darkness to allow C Sqn and the infantry to clear Wuustwezel, taking some prisoners. 'The night was pitch dark, it was raining, and there was no moon', and the Recce Trp scouting ahead were held up by a roadblock of trees, which were cleared by the leading Churchills. After a short rest, the regiment moved on at 0800 the following morning towards Nieuwmoer. By now the Recce Troop had run out of fuel, and the advance was led by A Sqn of 49 (West Riding) Reconnaissance Regiment RAC. When they came across a bridge that had been blown, the tanks had to fan out to the flanks in search of alternative crossings, and with no cover they were engaged over the flat country by German Self-Propelled guns. The advance had to be covered by smoke. Once clearance of the village was well in hand, the Recce Trp came up and pushed on carelessly into a wood occupied by German troops and SP guns. Four Honeys were knocked out, bringing the regiment's casualties to eight tanks in the day.

On 22 October, the advance continued towards Esschen, 107 RAC engaging enemy infantry and SP guns. The regiment's A Echelon vehicles, following behind, were ambushed and further casualties received. For the next day's advance, the Leicesters were relieved by two companies from 7th Battalion, Duke of Wellington's Regiment, who attacked Schanker successfully with C Sqn's Churchills on 24 October.

After a day's pause for planning, Clarkeforce was launched for a second time on 26 October for Operation Thruster towards Roosendaal. Clarkeforce pushed on towards Brembosch, losing four tanks and an SP gun from 245 Bty, 62nd A/Tk Regt. The following day, 107 RAC supported the 1st Leicesters in an attack along the Brembosch–Wouwse Hil road, and reached Oostlaar by nightfall. At first light, while replenishing their tanks, C Sqn came under fire, lost some vehicles and had to withdraw under smoke and covering fire, but at 0815 the regiment was ready to support an attack by 11th Royal Scots Fusiliers and cut the Wouw–Bergen-op-Zoom road, despite enemy SP guns. The advances were masked by smoke and covered by the remaining Achilles. The last day of Operation Thruster saw 107 RAC positioned to support an attack by 146th Infantry Brigade and the 9th Royal Tank Regiment. 107 RAC was withdrawn to Wouwe on 31 October to reorganise.

== Netherlands ==
After a period of maintenance, 107 RAC was temporarily attached to 31st Tank Brigade (part of 79th Armoured Division, equipped with specialist armour) and on 3 December went into action at Blerick in support of 15th (Scottish) Division in XII Corps. This well-planned and executed Corps attack on this heavily defended suburb of the Dutch town of Venlo (Operation Guildlford), was accompanied by strong artillery and Typhoon support, preceded by flail tanks to breach minefields, bridge-laying AVREs to cross an anti-tank ditch, and with a well-executed cover plan that misled the enemy as to the direction from which the attack would come. The objectives were achieved with remarkably few casualties.

Although due to return to 34 Tank Bde at the end of December, 107 RAC was suddenly moved to the Ardennes sector, where it came under the command of 6th Airborne Division to take part in British Second Army's counter-attack against the Northern edge of the 'Bulge' created by the German Ardennes Offensive. 6th Airborne Division and its supporting tanks, attacking on 3 January in atrocious weather, had a very hard fight with the Germans in Bure (see Battle of Bure), which changed hands several times in the next few days.

== Germany ==
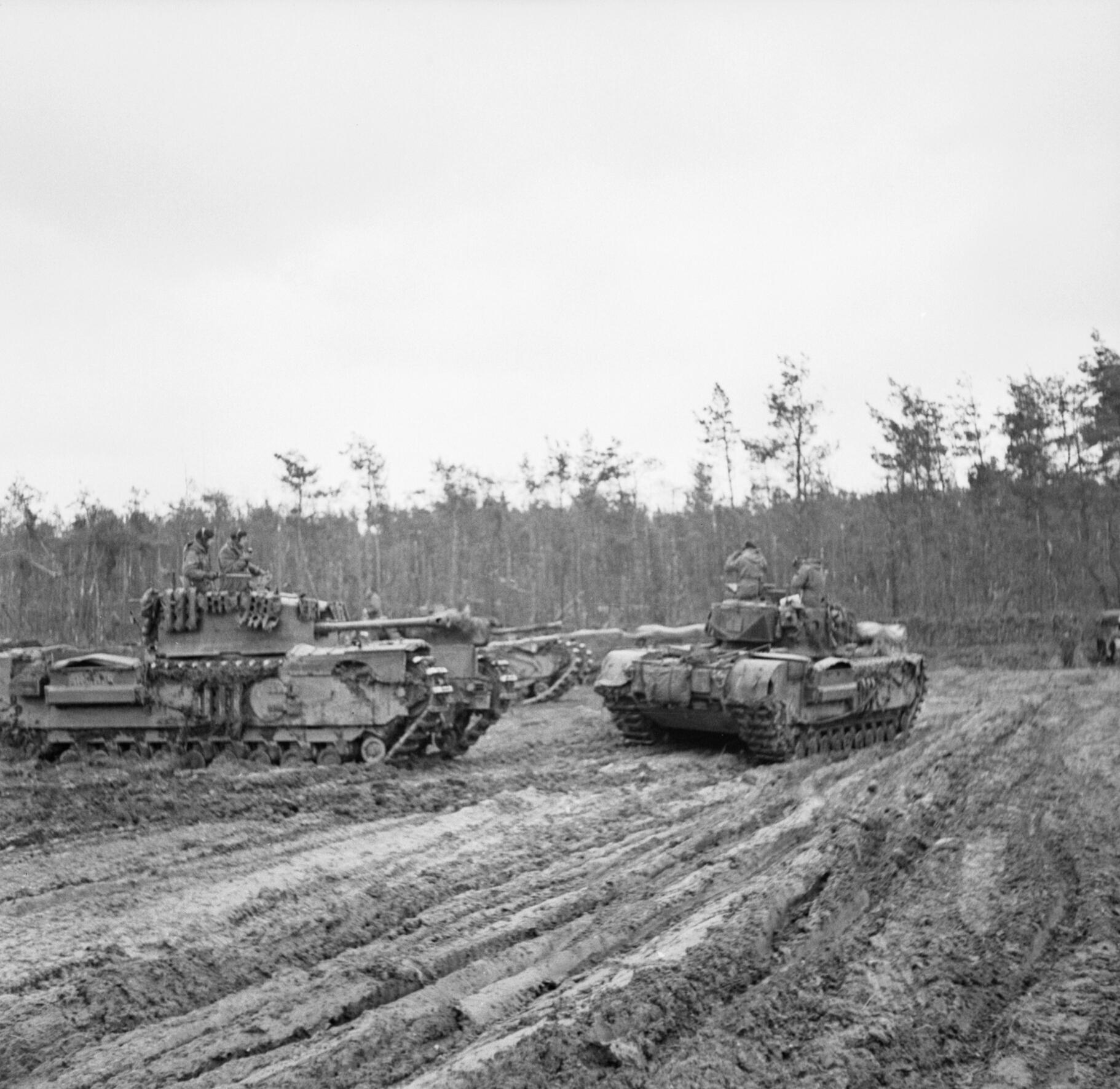
Churchill tanks of the 107th Regiment RAC (King's Own), part of the 34th Tank Brigade, at the start of the Reichswald battle, 9 February 1945.

107 RAC reverted to the command of 34th Armoured Brigade (as 34 Tank Brigade had been redesignated), for Operation Veritable, the British attack on the Siegfried Line in the Reichswald. Each of the regiment's squadrons was assigned to a different brigade of 51st (Highland) Division: A Sqn to 154 Brigade, B Sqn to 153 Brigade and C Sqn to 152 Brigade, supported by AVREs and flails to cross the anti-tank obstacles. Progress was slow in the close terrain, mud, and obstacles. Although 153 Brigade cleared the German anchor position in the Kiekberg Woods and got across the Gennep road on 9 February, the acting commanding officer of 1st Battalion, Gordon Highlanders (Major Martin Lindsay) was scathing about the support he received from B Sqn, which he described as 'The windiest and wettest imaginable'. Daily attacks continued until 21 February when 51st Highland took Goch. 107 RAC continued to support the Highlanders in their advance to the Rhine.

34th Armoured Brigade was attached to Neil Ritchie's XII Corps for the assault on the Rhine in March 1945, but 107 RAC saw little activity. In April it crossed the Rhine and took up occupation duties, with B Sqn attached to Second British Army as part of the GHQ guard. The regiment ended the war in Europe clearing battlefields and administering camps for displaced persons and released prisoners of war.

== Disbandment ==
The regiment was disbanded at the end of the Second World War in 1945. The 5th Battalion, King's Own Royal Regiment (Lancaster) was reconstituted in the Territorial Army in 1947 and bore the honorary distinction (on its colours and appointments) of the badge of the Royal Armoured Corps with the dates '1944–45' and a scroll carrying the words 'North-West Europe', to commemorate its career as 107th Regiment Royal Armoured Corps.
