= 126th (East Lancashire) Brigade =

East Lancashire Brigade 126th (East Lancashire) Brigade 126th Infantry Brigade
- Active: 1908–1919; 1920–1941
- Country: United Kingdom
- Branch: Territorial Army
- Type: Infantry
- Size: Brigade
- Part of: 42nd (East Lancashire) Infantry Division
- Engagements: Gallipoli Campaign; Battle of Romani; Battle of Passchendaele; Battles of the Somme (1918); Hundred Days Offensive (1918); Dunkirk evacuation

Commanders
- Notable commanders: Brigadier-General Viscount Hampden; Brigadier Lionel Bootle-Wilbraham

British 42nd (East Lancashire) Division Insignia

The 126th (East Lancashire) Brigade was an infantry brigade of the British Army during the First World War and the Second World War. It was assigned to the 42nd (East Lancashire) Division and served in the Middle East and on the Western Front in the Great War. In the Second World War, now as the 126th Infantry Brigade, it served again with the 42nd (East Lancashire) Division in France and was evacuated at Dunkirk and then later converted into 11th Armoured Brigade.

For most of its existence the brigade was composed of battalions of the East Lancashire Regiment and the Manchester Regiment, although in the late 1930s and the Second World War it was composed of battalions of the King's Own Royal Regiment (Lancaster) and the Border Regiment.

== Formation ==
On the creation of the Territorial Force in 1908, two Volunteer battalions from the East Lancashire Regiment, the 4th and 5th, and two from the Manchester Regiment, the 9th and 10th, were organised into an East Lancashire Brigade within the East Lancashire Division.

== First World War ==
On the outbreak of the First World War, most of the men volunteered for overseas service and the division embarked at Southampton and sailed for Egypt on 10 September 1914, the first TF division to leave England for foreign service. The division began disembarking at Alexandria on 25 September and the bulk (including the East Lancashire Brigade) concentrated at Cairo.

=== Order of battle ===
During the war, the East Lancashire Brigade was constituted as follows:

- 1/4th Battalion, East Lancashire Regiment (from Blackburn) (left February 1918)
- 1/5th Battalion, East Lancashire Regiment (from Burnley)
- 1/9th Battalion, Manchester Regiment (from Ashton-under-Lyne) (left February 1918)
- 1/10th Battalion, Manchester Regiment (from Oldham)
- 126th Machine Gun Company, Machine Gun Corps (formed 14 March 1916, moved to 42nd Battalion, Machine Gun Corps 23 February 1918)
- 126th Trench Mortar Battery (joined 26 March 1917)
- 1/8th Battalion, Manchester Regiment (from 127th Brigade February 1918)

When British infantry brigades were reduced to three battalions in February 1918, 1/4th East Lancs and 1/9th Manchesters transferred to the 66th (2nd East Lancashire) Division where they merged with their 2nd line battalions. 126th Brigade received 1/8th Manchesters from 127th Brigade in 42nd Division. At the same time, the machine gun company left to join a new divisional machine gun battalion.

=== Commanders ===
The following officers commanded the East Lancashire Brigade during the war:

- Brigadier-General D. G. Prendergast
- Brigadier-General Viscount Hampden (from 13 July 1915)
- Brigadier-General A. W. Tufnell (from 1 January 1916)
- Brigadier-General A. C. Johnston (from 14 September 1917; wounded 16 September)
- Brigadier-General W. W. Seymour (from 19 September 1917)
- Brigadier-General G. H. Wedgwood (from 25 May 1918)
- Brigadier-General T. H. S. Marchant (from 5 September 1918)

=== Egypt and Gallipoli ===
The East Lancashire Division remained in Egypt training and manning the Suez Canal defences until 1 May 1915 when it embarked at Alexandria for Gallipoli. The East Lancashire Brigade first went into action at the Third Battle of Krithia

In late May 1915 the division was numbered as 42nd (East Lancashire) Division – taking the lowest number of any TF division in recognition that it was the first to go overseas – and the brigades were also numbered, the East Lancashire becoming 126th (1/1st East Lancashire) Brigade. The battalions adopted the prefix '1/' (becoming 1/4th East Lancs, for example) to distinguish them from their 2nd Line duplicates then training in the United Kingdom as the 198th (2/1st East Lancashire) Brigade in 66th (2nd East Lancashire) Division.

The 126th Brigade participated in the Battle of Krithia Vineyard (6–13 August), where Lieutenant William Thomas Forshaw of the 1/9th Battalion, Manchester Regiment was awarded the Victoria Cross, and then for the rest of 1915 was engaged in trench warfare. After the evacuation from Gallipoli, the division returned to Egypt in January 1916 with less than half the strength with which it had set out. It remained in the Canal Defences for the whole of 1916, rebuilding its strength, and taking part in the Battle of Romani (4–5 August).

=== Western Front ===
In January 1917, 42nd Division was ordered to France, the move being completed by mid-March. It spent the remainder of the war on the Western Front. During 1917 it formed part of Fourth Army in 'quiet sectors' (though the brigade commander was wounded in September that year) and taking part in some minor operations along the Flanders coast.

In 1918 the division became part of IV Corps in Third Army, in which it remained for the rest of the war. During the German Army's Spring Offensive (Operation Michael or the First Battles of the Somme 1918), the troops of 42nd Division took part in the Battle of Bapaume (24–25 March), First Battle of Arras (28 March) and the Battle of Ancre (5 April). Then, during the Allied Hundred Days Offensive, it participated in the Battle of Albert (21–23 August) and the Second Battle of Bapaume (31 August–3 September) during the fighting on the Somme.

When the Hindenburg Line was breached during the Battle of the Canal du Nord on 27 September, 126th Brigade was holding the forward outpost line, but withdrew before Zero Hour for the rest of 42nd Division to attack through it. 125th Brigade's attack was only partially successful, but the advance was renewed after dark, and the following afternoon 126th Brigade passed through 127th to take Welsh ridge, the final objective.

Third Army's advance in Picardy culminated in the Battle of the Selle on 20 October. On 42nd Division's front, 1/5th East Lancashires (with its band playing) and 1/10th Manchesters of 126th Brigade led the attack over footbridges laid by the engineers over the River Selle. The Official History records that 'Very fierce fighting took place on the strongly held railway line, and it was two and a half hours before it was finally mopped up by the companies detailed for the purpose. The portion to the north of the attack up to the edge of Solesmes was dealt with by a company of the Manchester'. The rest of the division then moved on towards the final objective.

After the Selle, 42nd Division was withdrawn into reserve and halted around Beauvois-en-Cambrésis from 24 October until the advance was resumed on 3 November. On 7 November the 42nd Division was tasked to take the high ground west of Hautmont and if possible to capture the town. The division was held up by enfilade fire from the right, and 126th Brigade did no more than occupy some of the high ground. 125th Brigade was therefore ordered to pass through it the next morning and advance to the objective. But the 126th, 'in an endeavour to atone for its slowness on the 7th', pushed on and reached Hautmont before 125th could catch up.

By 10 November the most forward troops were on the Maubeuge–Avesnes-sur-Helpe road. This was the end of the fighting, because the Armistice with Germany came into the effect the following day. In December the division moved into quarters in the Charleroi area and by mid-March 1919 most of its troops had gone home for demobilisation.

== Between the wars ==
The division and brigade were both disbanded shortly after the end of the war, along with the rest of the Territorial Force. However, in the 1920s, the TF was reformed as the Territorial Army and both the 42nd Division and the 126th (East Lancashire) Infantry Brigade were themselves also reformed, with the brigade including the same battalions as it had before the First World War.

However, the brigade's order of battle saw many changes over the years: in 1921 the 4th and 5th battalions of the East Lancashire Regiment were amalgamated into the 4th/5th Battalion, East Lancashire Regiment. The 9th Battalion, Manchester Regiment was transferred to the 127th (Manchester) Infantry Brigade, of the 42nd Division, and the brigade received the 4th (Westmorland) and 5th (Cumberland) battalions of the Border Regiment in exchange, both of which had previously been attached to the division, but not part of it, as Army Troops. The 10th Battalion, Manchester Regiment became a battalion of the Royal Tank Regiment in 1938, becoming the 41st (Oldham) Royal Tank Regiment, later to serve with the 24th Army Tank Brigade. In the same year, the 4th/5th Battalion, East Lancashire Regiment transferred to the 127th Brigade and received the 5th Battalion, King's Own Royal Regiment (Lancaster) in return, previously from the 164th (North Lancashire) Infantry Brigade, of the 55th (West Lancashire) Infantry Division. Sometime in 1939, the brigade was redesignated as the 126th Infantry Brigade.

== Second World War ==
The 42nd Division, along with the rest of the Territorial Army, was mobilised in late August 1939, and days later the German Army launched its invasion of Poland. When the Second World War began, on 3 September 1939, the 126th Infantry Brigade was once again fully mobilised and embodied for full-time war service as a 1st Line Territorial Army brigade and the units were soon brought up to their War Establishment strength as some, in particular the 5th Battalion, King's Own Royal Regiment (Lancaster), were under-strength.

Soon after mobilisation, the 4th Battalion, Border Regiment was posted away to become part of 25th Infantry Brigade on lines of communications duties in France. They were replaced by the 1st Battalion, East Lancashire Regiment, a Regular Army unit that had been stationed in Northern Ireland, under command of Northern Ireland District. The brigade and the rest of the division then began training for war, although, with most of the British Army at the time, with obsolete tactics in trench warfare dating from the 1914-1918 war.

=== Order of battle ===
The 126th Infantry Brigade was constituted as follows during the war:

- 5th Battalion, King's Own Royal Regiment (Lancaster)
- 4th Battalion, Border Regiment (left 29 October 1939, to 25th Brigade)
- 5th Battalion, Border Regiment
- 1st Battalion, East Lancashire Regiment (joined 10 November 1939, left to 127th Brigade 8 September 1941)
- 126th Infantry Brigade Anti-Tank Company (formed 20 January 1940, disbanded 21 January 1941)
- 5th Battalion, Manchester Regiment (from 127th Brigade 8 September 1941)

=== Commanders ===
The following officers commanded 126th Infantry Brigade during the war:

- Brigadier E.G. Darwell (until 13 January 1940)
- Brigadier E.G. Miles (from 13 January until 20 September 1940)
- Brigadier L. Bootle-Wilbraham (from 20 September 1940 until 22 September 1941)
- Brigadier H.L. Birks (from 22 September 1941)

=== France and Dunkirk ===
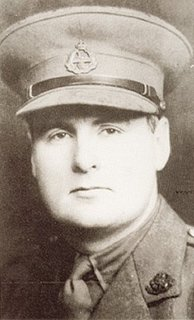
Captain Harold Marcus-Ervine Andrews VC.

The 126th Infantry Brigade, under the command of Brigadier Eric Miles DSO MC–a tough but highly competent Regular Army officer of the King's Own Scottish Borderers, with the nickname of "Miles the soldier"–landed, with most of the rest of the division, in France on 15 April 1940 to reinforce the British Expeditionary Force (BEF) on the Franco-Belgian border. The 42nd Division, led by Major-General William Holmes DSO, came under command of III Corps, serving alongside the 5th Division, a Regular Army formation, and the 44th (Home Counties) Division, a Territorial. The latter division had, along with the 42nd, initially been held back from reinforcing the BEF sooner to participate in potential operations in Northern Europe, although this plan had never come to fruition and both were sent overseas in the same month.

During the Battle of France in May 1940 42nd Division helped to hold the line of the River Escaut and the canals, until, with the rest of the BEF, it was forced to withdraw to Dunkirk. When most of the 42nd Division was evacuated from Dunkirk, 126th Brigade remained behind, transferring to the 1st Division for the final part of the battle and only being evacuated on 2 June. After arriving back in England the brigade rejoined the 42nd Division, then serving in Northern Command. During the evacuation Captain Marcus Ervine-Andrews, Officer Commanding (OC) B Company of the 1st Battalion, East Lancashire Regiment, was awarded the regiment's, the brigade and division's first and only Victoria Cross of the war. He was also the first of eight Irish military personnel to be awarded the VC throughout the Second World War. After returning to England, the brigade was reorganised and, due to the very heavy losses sustained in France, absorbed large numbers of conscripted men as replacements, most of whom had no prior military experience, and was tasked mainly with coastal and home defence and training in an anti-invasion role to repel a potential German invasion of England. The invasion never arrived, mainly due to events that happened during the Battle of Britain in the summer of 1940, and the brigade was able to begin training for offensive operations.

=== Conversion ===
On 1 November 1941, the 42nd Division was converted into 42nd Armoured Division, and 126th Brigade was converted into and redesignated 11th Armoured Brigade. Its infantry battalions became tank regiments of the Royal Armoured Corps as 107th Regiment RAC (King's Own) (previously 5th King's Own), 110th Regiment RAC (Border Regiment) (formerly 5th Borders) and 111th Regiment RAC (Manchester Regiment) (5th Manchesters, transferred from 127th Brigade, replacing 1st East Lancs).

== Recipients of the Victoria Cross ==
- Lieutenant William Thomas Forshaw, 1/9th Battalion, Manchester Regiment, First World War
- Private Walter Mills, 1/10th Battalion, Manchester Regiment, First World War
- 2nd Lieutenant Alfred Victor Smith, 1/5th Battalion, East Lancashire Regiment, First World War
- Captain Marcus Ervine-Andrews, 1st Battalion, East Lancashire Regiment, Second World War

== External sources ==
- The Long, Long Trail
- The Regimental Warpath 1914–1918
