= 153rd Regiment Royal Armoured Corps =

- Active: 1941–28 August 1944
- Disbanded: 28 August 1944
- Country: United Kingdom
- Branch: British Army
- Type: Armoured
- Role: Infantry Support
- Size: Regiment
- Part of: Royal Armoured Corps
- Engagements: Second World War: Normandy

The 153rd Regiment Royal Armoured Corps (153 RAC, sometimes known as 153 (Essex) Regt RAC) was an armoured regiment of the Royal Armoured Corps, part of the British Army, and was raised during the Second World War. The regiment saw brief but intense action in the invasion of Normandy before being broken up to provide replacements to other units.

== Origin ==
153rd RAC was formed by conversion to the armoured role of the 8th Battalion, Essex Regiment, a hostilities-only infantry battalion that had been raised during 1940. The battalion had been serving in 226th Independent Infantry Brigade (Home), a Home Defence formation, when the whole brigade was converted into 34th Army Tank Brigade on 1 December 1941. The regiment served in the brigade alongside the North Irish Horse and 147 RAC and later 151 RAC (later redesignated 107 RAC) when the North Irish Horse was transferred elsewhere. In common with other infantry battalions transferred to the Royal Armoured Corps, the personnel of 153 RAC would have continued to wear their Essex Regiment cap badge on the black beret of the Royal Armoured Corps.

During the conversion, surplus personnel were formed into "R" Company, Essex Regiment, which soon afterwards was designated V Corps HQ Defence Company.

== Training ==
153 RAC began to receive its first Churchill tanks in March 1942; it had its full scale of equipment by the end of August. Having been billeted in Swindon, Wiltshire, the regiment moved with 34th Tank Brigade to Eastern England and then the South Coast for training. At the end of 1942 it moved to Broome Park, Kent, which remained the regiment's base for the next year, utilising firing ranges across Southern England.

In early 1944, as training intensified for the coming Normandy invasion, 153 RAC moved to Folkestone in Kent, and then Headley, Surrey, before finally moving to its Marshalling Area near Portsmouth at the end of June.

== Service ==
153 RAC was transported to Normandy from 2–4 July. As an independent brigade under 21st Army Group, 34th Tank Brigade could be assigned to support any infantry division that required the assistance of tanks, its regiments usually split up to form brigade groups with the infantry.

On 9 July, 153 RAC was ordered to move to I Corps' front to prepare for an attack on Caen, but the fall of the city (Operation Charnwood) led to the cancellation of the move. 153 RAC finally went into action on 16 July, when 34 Tank Brigade supported 227th Brigade of 15th (Scottish) Infantry Division in an attack in the Esquay–Évrecy area west of Caen. The object of the operation was to "hold the attention of the enemy to that front while preparations for a breakthrough were being made east of Caen" (referring to the forthcoming Operation Goodwood).

The last phase of 227 Brigade and 34 Tank Brigade's joint operation was an attack on the wooded area of Gavrus and Bougy by 8th Battalion, Royal Scots and 153 RAC. Some Churchill Crocodile flamethrowing tanks and Churchill AVREs were assigned to support the operation but were not used. The attack began at 05.30 on 16 July, and the final objective was reached by 10.25, but there were still enemy troops in the woods to be mopped up. An early casualty was the regimental commanding officer, hit in the back while climbing into his tank. At 14.50 the Germans counter-attacked with a mixed force, and the British claimed to have destroyed a Tiger tank. In a second counter-attack later in the afternoon the Germans lost another Tiger and three Panther tanks. The regimental war diary refers to "a slogging match" throughout the rest of the day. Casualties included the commander of "A" Squadron and four of his crews who crossed a ridge to deal with machine-guns on the flank. Their burnt-out tanks were discovered weeks later near Évrecy. The counter-attacks dwindled after 18.00, and 153 withdrew into its forward rally position. It was in this posn. [sic] that the majority of the casualties occurred. A considerable number of tks were damaged and crews injured through intense mortar fire'.

The following day, 153 RAC formed two composite squadrons, absorbing the remnants of "A" Squadron. "C" Squadron spent 17 July north of Bougy as an immediate counter-attack force, and was heavily mortared. "B" Sqn supported an attack by 147 RAC and 53rd (Welsh) Infantry Division. "B" Squadron was soon engaged by enemy armour and the battle continued until nightfall, with casualties including the squadron commander. 153 RAC's total casualties for this two-day operation comprised 10 tanks knocked out or destroyed, 16 officers and 70 other ranks killed, wounded, or missing. The crews had been in their tanks for 30 hours without relief, either in action or instant readiness.

Over succeeding days, the regiment was rested and reorganised. From 23 July, it returned to supporting other formations in a defensive role around Bougy and Maltot. In early August, its tanks fired in support of raids by 158th Brigade of 53rd (Welsh) Division trying to establish whether 10th SS Panzer Division was still in front. It transpired that the Germans were withdrawing. On 5 August, 153 RAC made a rapid cross-country move to Mondrainville to support 177th Brigade of 59th (Staffordshire) Infantry Division, which was attacking towards Mont Pincon. The operation was mounted so hurriedly that there was no time to organise a proper tie-up between tanks and infantry. Next, 153 RAC was transferred to support 197th Brigade of the 59th (Staffordshire) Division, which crossed the River Orne on 9 August. The following day, it followed the retreating enemy, carrying infantry aboard its tanks. The regiment continued in the line until 15 August, supporting infantry and helping to clear up pockets of resistance.

== Disbandment ==
On 17 August, 153 RAC learned that it was to be disbanded, due to a severe manpower shortage, to provide replacements for other regiments. "C" Squadron was transferred complete to 107 RAC; the rest of the personnel went to the other regiments of 34th Tank Brigade or to holding units. The regiment ceased to exist on 28 August 1944. 153 RAC was replaced in 34 Tank Brigade by 9th Royal Tank Regiment.

== External sources ==
- Land Forces of Britain, the Empire and Commonwealth
