= 111th Regiment Royal Armoured Corps =

111th Regiment Royal Armoured Corps (Manchester Regiment))
- Active: 1941–1943
- Disbanded: 1943
- Country: United Kingdom
- Branch: British Army
- Type: Armoured Regiment
- Role: Infantry Support; Training
- Part of: Royal Armoured Corps
- Equipment: Cruiser Mk IV; Valentine; Churchill

The 111th Regiment Royal Armoured Corps (Manchester Regiment) (111 RAC) was an armoured regiment of the British Army, raised by the Royal Armoured Corps during the Second World War.

== Origin ==
111th Regiment RAC was formed on 1 November 1941 by the conversion to the armoured role of 5th Battalion of the Manchester Regiment, a 1st Line Territorial Army infantry battalion. In common with other infantry units transferred to the Royal Armoured Corps, all personnel would have continued to wear their Manchester cap badge on the black beret of the Royal Armoured Corps.

The 5th Battalion, Manchester Regiment had been serving in 126th Infantry Brigade of 42nd (East Lancashire) Infantry Division, which had fought in France and been evacuated at Dunkirk. The brigade and division were later redesignated 11th Armoured Brigade (later 11th Tank Brigade) and 42nd Armoured Division respectively. At the time of conversion, 111 RAC was based at Bingley, West Yorkshire. It began receiving its first tanks (Cruiser Mk IVs) in April 1942; but, from June, it began receiving Churchill infantry tanks - it was at this time that 11 Armoured Bde was detached from 42nd Armoured Division and became an independent Army Tank Brigade.

== History ==
In August 1942, the regiment moved to Bolton Castle in North Yorkshire. At this point, its squadron organisation comprised one troop of Churchills and two troops each of 1 Churchill and 2 Valentine tanks. However, half of the 60 tanks it required for squadron and regimental training had to be borrowed from the other regiments in the brigade, 107 and 110 RAC. From September 1942 to April 1943, the regiment was based at Wensley and Middleham, training on ranges in North Yorkshire.

In January 1943, the 11th Tank Brigade was attached to 77th Infantry (Reserve) Division and its regiments were given the role of holding and training replacements. Finally, in Autumn 1943, the decision was made disband 11th Tank Brigade, without it ever having seen active service, and it was broken up before the end of November. 111 RAC moved first to Berwick-upon-Tweed and then dispersed to various locations in Lincolnshire. On 15 November, it received orders to reconvert to infantry as 5th Bn Manchester Regiment. In the summer of 1944, the reconstituted infantry battalion acted as the Royal Bodyguard at Balmoral Castle while the Royal Family was in residence and then served as a machine-gun battalion with 55th (West Lancashire) Infantry Division until the end of the war.

== External sources ==
- Tameside Museums
