= Robert Darke =

English cricketer

Personal information
- Full name: Robert Henry Darke
- Born: 25 January 1876; Dunsden Green, Oxfordshire, England
- Died: 19 July 1961 (aged 85); Balham, London, England
- Batting: Unknown
- Bowling: Unknown

Career statistics
Competition	First-class
Matches	1
Runs scored	0
Batting average	–
100s/50s	–/–
Top score	–
Catches/stumpings	–/–
- Source: Cricinfo, 29 July 2019

Robert Henry Darke (25 January 1876 – 19 July 1961) was an English first-class cricketer.

Darke was born at Dunsden House in the village of Dunsden, Oxfordshire. He made a single appearance in first-class cricket for the Gentlemen of England against Oxford University at Crystal Palace in 1905. In a match where no play was possible on the first two days due to rain, Darke was not called upon to bat or bowl on the third and final day of the match. Darke died at Balham in July 1961.
