= Gorre British and Indian Cemetery =

Cemetery in Pas-de-Calais, France

- Commonwealth War Graves Commission
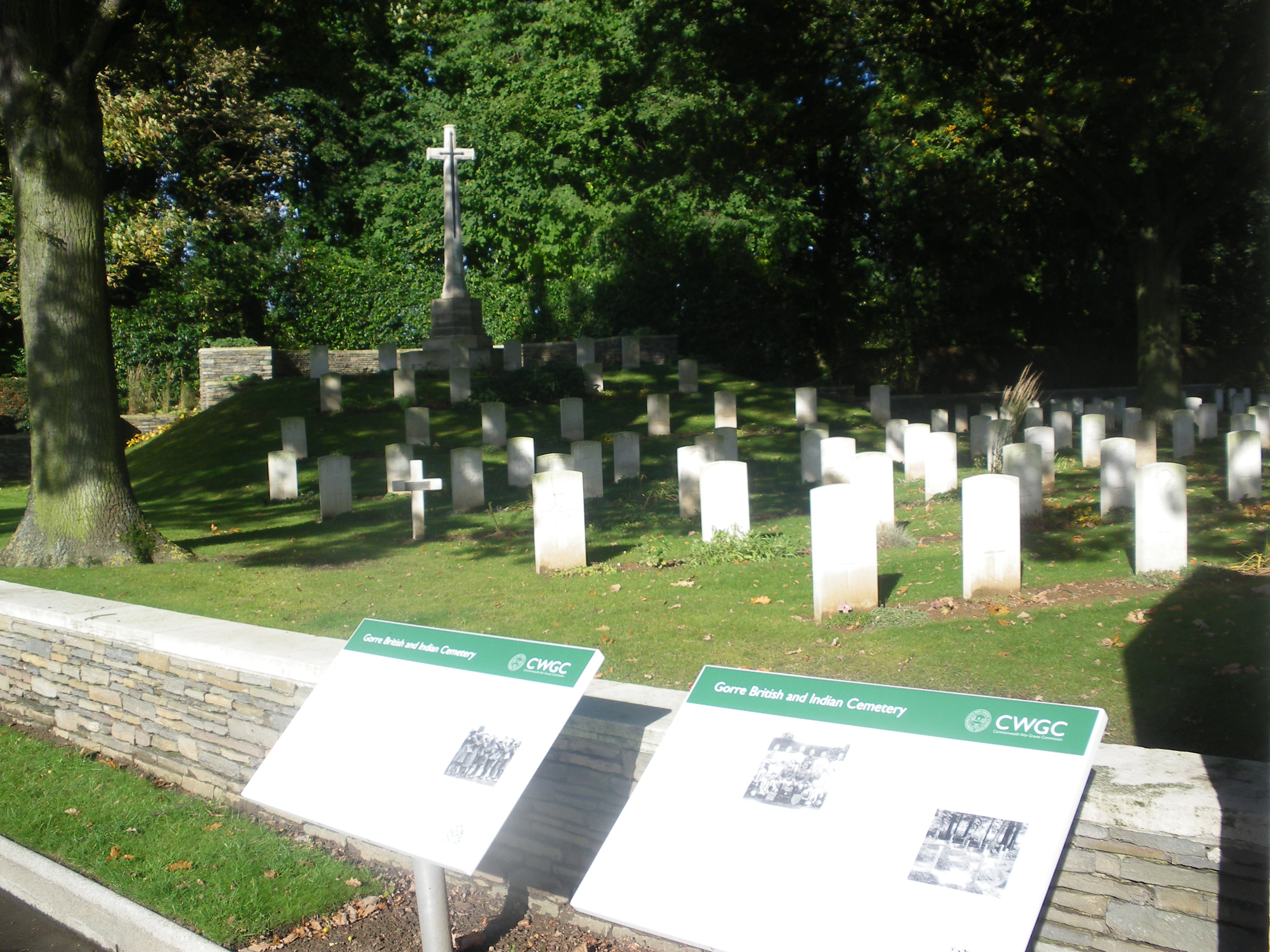
- Gorre Cemetery
- Used for those deceased 1914-1918
- Established: Autumn 1914
- Location: 50.53975°N 2.69974°E; Beuvry, Pas de Calais, France
- Designed by: Charles Holden
- Total burials: 942

Burials by nation
- * United Kingdom: 815: India: 80; German Empire: 6; South Africa: 2; Australia: 1; France: 1

Gorre British and Indian Cemetery is a Commonwealth War Graves Commission military cemetery containing Commonwealth burials from the First World War, located in the French department of Pas-de-Calais.

The cemetery is located 1.6 miles (2.6 km) north of Beuvry and 2.5 miles (4.0 km) east of Béthune.

== History ==
During the First World War, the chateau at Gorre was used as a camp for British and Indian soldiers, who turned a small part of the chateau grounds into a makeshift cemetery.

The Indian section of Gorre Cemetery was closed in October 1915 as the Indian divisions were redeployed to the Middle East.

Many British casualties were added to the cemetery after the Battle of Estaires, part of the German Spring Offensive of 1918.

== Location ==
The cemetery is easily found in Gorre which can be reached by taking the D72 eastbound from Bethune.

== Notable Burials ==
- Lt. Gordon Sanderson (d.1915) of 2nd Bn., Machine Gun Corps. A native of Settle, North Yorkshire buried in Row I, Grave E11.
- Pte. Walter Mills VC (1894–1917) of 1st Bn., Manchester Regiment, Victoria Cross recipient. A native of Oldham, Lancashire buried in Row V, Grave C2.
- Spr. Henry Ralph (d.1917) of the Australian Boring & Mining Company, the only Australian burial in the cemetery. A native of Bendigo, Victoria buried in Row V, Grave A14.
