= 11th Armoured Brigade (United Kingdom) =

- Active: 1941–1943; 1970-1977; 1981-1993
- Country: United Kingdom
- Branch: British Army
- Type: Armoured
- Size: Brigade
- Part of: 1st (United Kingdom) Division
- Engagements: Second World War

The 11th Armoured Brigade was an armoured brigade of the British Army raised during the Second World War. The brigade was a 1st Line Territorial Army formation, consisting of three infantry battalions converted into armoured regiments.

== History ==
The 11th Armoured Brigade was formed from the redesignation of the 126th Infantry Brigade, part of 42nd (East Lancashire) Infantry Division, on 1 November 1941. During this time, the brigade formed part of the 42nd Armoured Division. On 25 July 1942, the brigade was converted from an armoured role (equipped with cruiser tanks) into an infantry support role (equipped with infantry tanks). As part of this conversion, the brigade was re-designated the 11th Tank Brigade. During most of 1943, the brigade was attached to the 77th Infantry (Reserve) Division as a training formation. On 23 November, the brigade was disbanded and its regiments were broken up.

== Order of battle ==
Subordinate units included:

- 107th Regiment Royal Armoured Corps (previously 5th Battalion, King's Own Royal Regiment (Lancaster))
- 110th Regiment Royal Armoured Corps (previously 5th Battalion, Border Regiment)
- 111th Regiment Royal Armoured Corps (previously 5th Battalion, Manchester Regiment)
- 1st Battalion, Highland Light Infantry

== Commanders ==
- Brigadier H.L. Birks (from 1 November 1941 until 25 July 1942)
- Colonel R.A. France (Acting, from 26 October 1942 until 2 November 1942)
- Brigadier H.C.J. Yeo (from 2 November 1942 until 1 June 1943)
- Brigadier J.G.R. Runciman (from 1 June 1943)

== Postwar ==
The brigade was one of two "square brigades" assigned to 1st Armoured Division when this was formed in 1976. It was converted into "Task Force Bravo", and ceased to exist in 1977. ("Task Force Bravo" became 22nd Armoured Brigade four years later.) The brigade was reinstated by converting "Task Force Golf" into an armoured brigade in 1981, assigned to 4th Armoured Division and was based at Kingsley Barracks in Minden. It disbanded in 1993.

== See also ==
- British Armoured formations of World War II
- List of British brigades of the Second World War
