= William Walter Seymour =

British military officer serving 1904 - 1918

Brigadier-General William Walter Seymour
- Military career
- Allegiance: United Kingdom
- Branch: British Army
- Service years: 1904–1918
- Rank: Brigadier-General
- Commands: 126th (East Lancashire) Brigade; 42nd (East Lancashire) Infantry Division; 204th (2nd Cheshire) Brigade
- Conflicts: First World War

Brigadier-General William Walter Seymour (28 November 1878 – 12 July 1940) was a senior British Army officer who briefly served as general officer commanding the 42nd (East Lancashire) Infantry Division during the First World War.

== Military career ==
Seymour was commissioned into the Rifle Brigade (The Prince Consort's Own) in 1904.

He commanded a battalion in France during the First World War and was appointed Chevalier of the Legion of Honour on 24 February 1916. He then briefly served as acting general officer commanding the 42nd (East Lancashire) Infantry Division from 1 October 1917 to 15 October 1917 in France.

After that, he served on the North-West Frontier in India in 1919.
