= Dunsden Green =

Village in Oxfordshire, England

Coordinates: 51.4923°N 0.9372°W

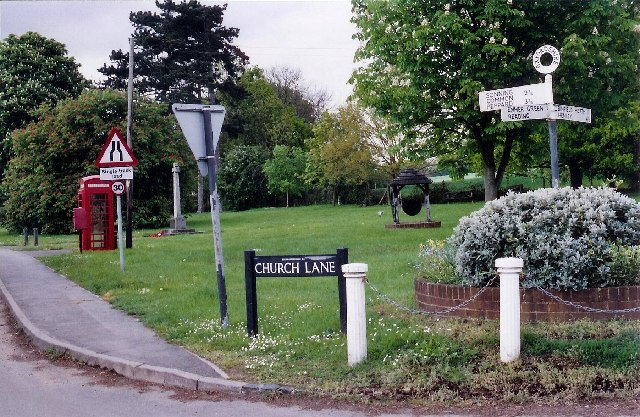
- The village green at Dunsden

- Location within Oxfordshire
- OS grid reference: SU7377
- Civil parish: Eye & Dunsden
- District: South Oxfordshire
- Shire county: Oxfordshire
- Region: South East
- Country: England
- Sovereign state: United Kingdom
- Post town: Reading
- Postcode district: RG4
- Dialling code: 0118
- Police: Thames Valley
- Fire: Oxfordshire
- Ambulance: South Central
- UK Parliament: Henley
- Website: Eye & Dunsden Parish Council

Dunsden Green or Dunsden is a village in the civil parish of Eye & Dunsden in the South Oxfordshire ward of Sonning Common, about 3 miles (5 km) northeast of Reading, Berkshire. Until 1866 it was in the Oxfordshire part of Sonning parish.

== History ==
The toponym means "valley of a man named Dyn(n)e". In 1086 the Domesday Book recorded it as Dunesdene, and a document of 1586 records it as Donsden Grene. The Church of England parish church of All Saints was designed by the architect John Turner and built in 1842. Nearby is the former vicarage. The future First World War poet Wilfred Owen lived here from September 1911 to February 1913 when he served as a lay assistant to the parish priest, Rev. Herbert Wigan. The Dunsden Owen Association has been formed to commemorate the poet's links with the area, and a smartphone app can be downloaded which provides an interactive guide to the sites with which he was connected.

The village school was built in 1848. It closed in December 1973 and is now the village hall. In 2002 the microbrewery Loddon Brewery was established in a converted 18th century brick and flint barn at Dunsden Green Farm. In November 2007 a new community orchard was established by the planting of a Blenheim Orange apple tree on the village green by Lord Phillimore, the main local landowner. The orchard is beside the village green.

== Notable people ==
- Robert Darke (1876–1961), cricketer
- Wilfred Owen (1893–1918), poet lived here from 1911 to 1913

== Gallery ==
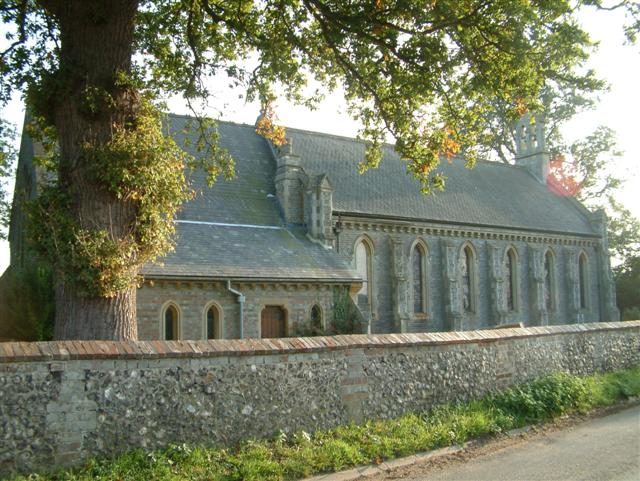
All Saints' parish church, Dunsden.

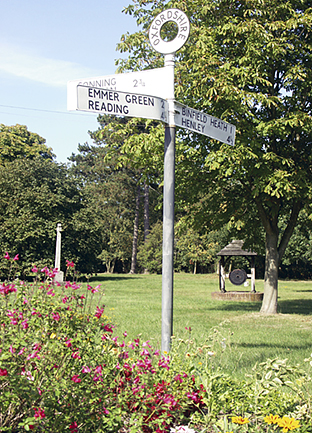
The green at Dunsden Green.

== See also ==
- List of places in Oxfordshire
