= 191st (Hertfordshire and Essex Yeomanry) Field Regiment, Royal Artillery =

191st (Hertfordshire and Essex Yeomanry) Field Regiment, RA
- Cap Badge of the Royal Artillery
- Active: 21 December 1942–4 December 1944
- Country: United Kingdom
- Branch: British Army
- Type: Field Artillery Regiment
- Part of: 42nd Armoured Division; First Canadian Army
- Engagements: Operation Overlord; Operation Epsom; Operation Charnwood; Operation Goodwood; Operation Paddle; Operation Astonia; Battle of the Scheldt

The 191st (Hertfordshire and Essex Yeomanry) Field Regiment was a unit of Britain's Royal Artillery (RA) formed during World War II. Created around experienced drafts from existing Territorial Army units, it trained as mobile artillery with an armoured division. Later it served through the campaign in North West Europe, supporting varied formations such as the Royal Marine Commandos, Royal Armoured Corps and Polish troops operating under First Canadian Army.

== Origin ==
In late 1942 the Royal Artillery formed 11 new regiments of field artillery built upon cadres drawn from experienced units. On 16 December the two field regiments in 42nd Armoured Division, 86th (Hertfordshire Yeomanry) and 147th (Essex Yeomanry) were ordered to provide cadres of approximately battery strength for a new regiment to be numbered 191st. The unit started to form on 21 December and immediately adopted the designation 'Herts and Essex Yeomanry', with the following organisation:

- Regimental Headquarters (RHQ)
- 532 Field Battery – cadre from 413 Bty of 147th Fd Rgt
- 533 Field Battery – cadre from 462 Bty of 86th Fd Rgt
- 534 Field Battery – cadres from both regiments

The second-in-command of 147th (EY) Fd Rgt, Major J.R. Cochrane, a Regular Army officer, was promoted to lieutenant-colonel to command the new regiment, which took over billets and Nissen huts at Hovingham and Slingsby, North Yorkshire, previously occupied by 86th (HY) Fd Rgt. Apart from the large cadres from the two yeomanry regiments, 191st was to be made up to strength with men from disbanded infantry battalions. The first to arrive were 112 men from 30th Battalion, Wiltshire Regiment. (Note: This battalion was formed in 1941, apparently from 6th (Home Defence) Battalion Wiltshire Regiment, which was formed after the outbreak of hostilities in 1939. Most infantry battalions designated '30' or above were intended for garrison or internal security duties, 80 percent of the men being below medical category A. It is probable that the draft for 191st Fd Rgt was drawn from the remaining 20 per cent.)

== Training ==
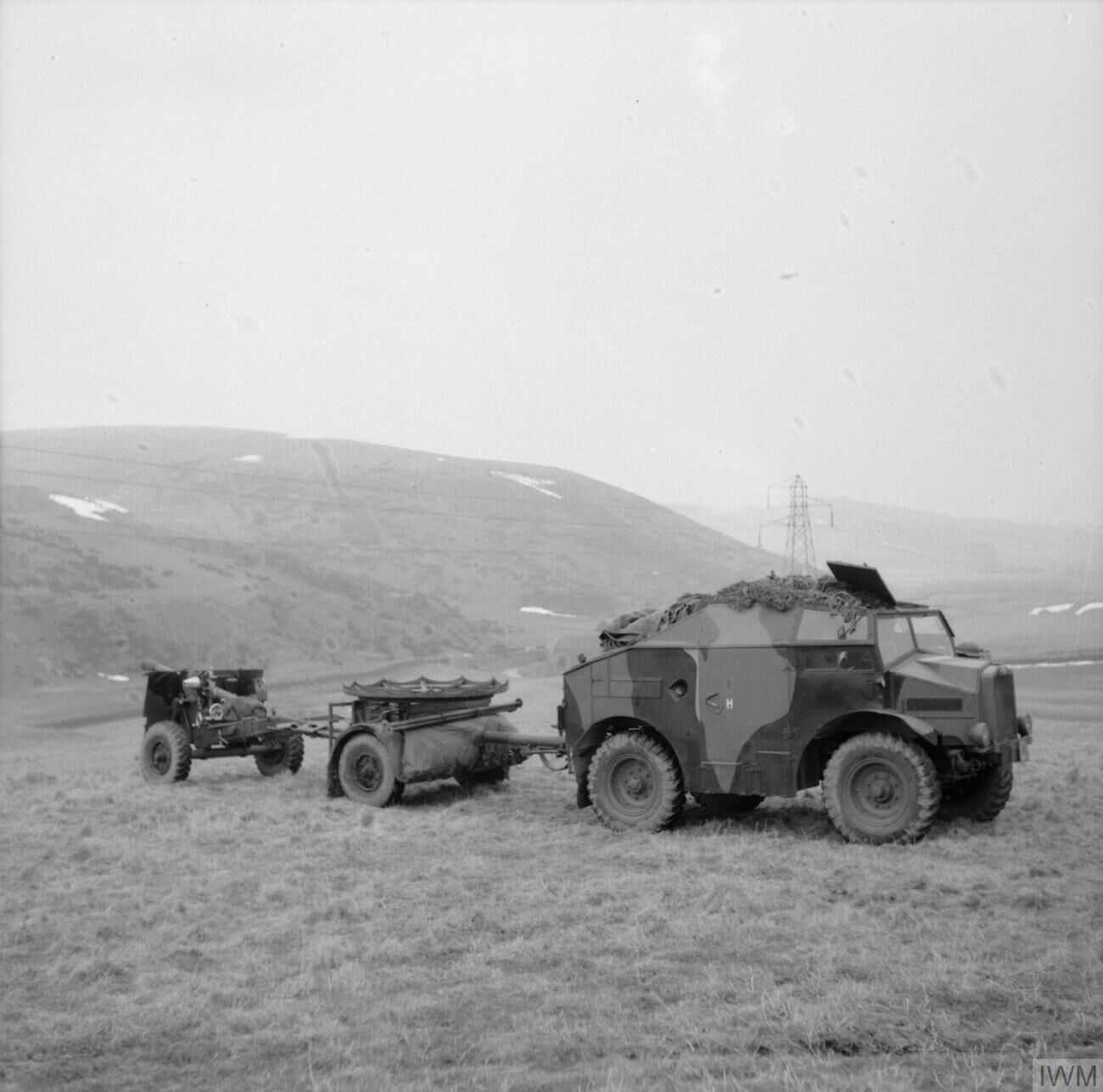
25-pounder gun and Quad tractor on exercise in the UK.

The regiment's first eight 25-pounder guns and tractors arrived at the beginning of January 1943, and a month later 533 and 534 Btys had their full establishment of eight guns each, though 532 Bty had to make do with old 18/25-pounders at first. (Note: The establishment of a field regiment from 1941 onwards was three batteries, each of two four-gun troops.) At the end of three months, the regiment was at full establishment in manpower, and training was proceeding, though there were few men suitable for training as signallers. A Light Aid Detachment (LAD) of the Royal Electrical and Mechanical Engineers (REME) had been formed, but at first had no vehicles or equipment.

At the end of March 1943, 42nd Armoured Division transferred from Northern Command to Southern Command and 191st (H&EY) Fd Rgt went with it, moving to Trowbridge Barracks. On 3 May it officially replaced 86th Fd Rgt in 42nd Armoured Division. That month a detachment of the Royal Corps of Signals arrived to man the 'rear link' communications. (Note: Internal communication within artillery regiments was carried out by RA signallers or 'driver-operators'.) Later the regiment was issued with Crusader Mk III tanks for armoured Observation Posts (OPs), later replaced by Cavaliers. During the spring of 1943 the regiment carried out field firing at Okehampton Camp, mobile exercises with 30th Armoured Brigade on West Down, Salisbury Plain, and an armour–infantry live-firing exercise at Sennybridge Training Area with 71st Infantry Brigade. It was known that 42nd Armoured Division was to be broken up, so during the summer 147th Fd Rgt worked mostly with 30th Armoured Bde and 191st with 71st Infantry Bde – 532 Bty affiliated to 1st Battalion Highland Light Infantry, 533 to 1st Bn Oxfordshire and Buckinghamshire Light Infantry, and 534 to 1st Bn East Lancashire Regiment. In September there were further practice shoots at Okehampton, with 532 Bty being loaned to 79th Armoured Division for exercises at Linney Head, Pembrokeshire.

42nd Armoured Division was broken up in October 1943, and after a period of uncertainty 191st (H&EY) Fd Rgt went to Ramillies Barracks, Aldershot, where it was ordered to mobilise as part of 2nd Canadian Army Group Royal Artillery (AGRA). (Note: AGRAs were powerful artillery brigades, usually comprising three medium regiments and one field regiment, which could be rapidly moved about the battlefield, and had the punch to destroy enemy artillery.)

In November 1943 the regiment moved to Sutton in Surrey, but spent much time training on the Otterburn and Redesale ranges and on Salisbury Plain. On 1 January 1944 Lt-Col Cochrane was appointed to the staff of First Canadian Army and was succeeded in command by Lt-Col Maurice Hope. Shortly afterwards, the regiment was offered the opportunity to take on the identity of 6th Field Regiment, a Regular Army unit that had been disbanded in India. However, 191st decided to retain its links with the county Yeomanry regiments and turned down the offer.

Training now concentrated on the role the regiment would take in the forthcoming invasion of Europe (Operation Overlord). 2nd Canadian AGRA was not scheduled to land until late in the build-up programme for the invasion, but 3rd Canadian Division would be landing on Juno Beach on D-Day under the command of I British Corps and would require extra firepower. 191st (H&EY) Field Rgt was therefore attached to I Corps' 4th AGRA for the early stages of the operation. Training in loading and unloading from landing craft became a priority, and the Cavalier tanks were abandoned (thereafter OP tanks would have to be borrowed from the armoured formations the guns were supporting). Final live-firing and loading exercises were carried out in the spring of 1944, and in April the regiment moved into I Corps' concentration area in Essex: RHQ and 533 Bty at Ramsden Hall, near Billericay, 532 Bty to Great Baddow, and 534 Bty to Little Baddow. On 2 June the regiment moved to its marshalling area in Epping Forest and on the morning of 6 June, as the leading assault waves landed on the Normandy beaches, 191st (H&EY) Fd Rgt moved to Royal Albert Dock, where it embarked at 18.00.

== Normandy campaign ==
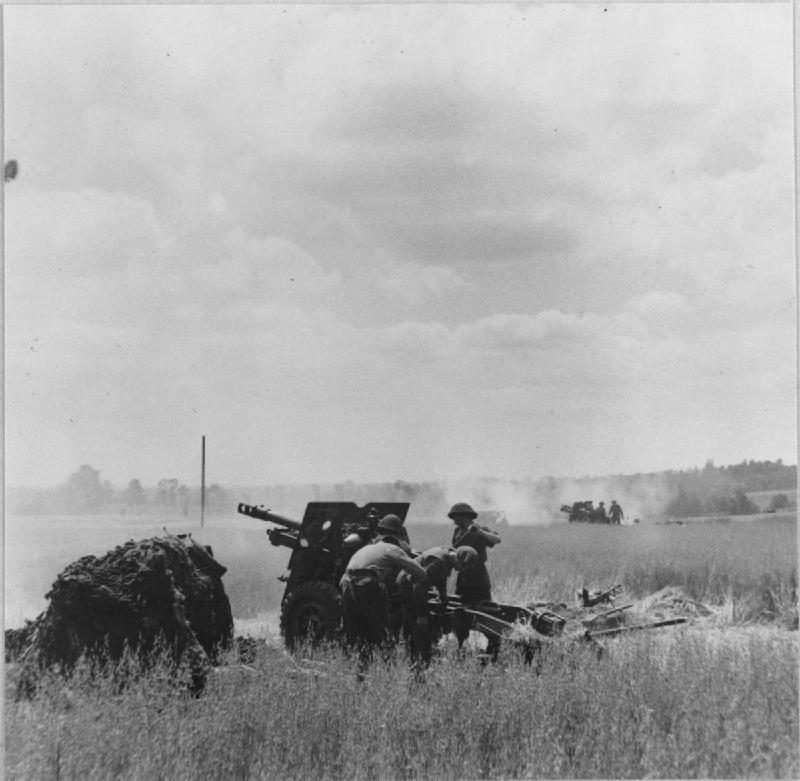
25-pounders in action in Normandy, June 1944.

The regiment began landing about half a mile west of Courseulles-sur-Mer on 9 June (D + 3) and completed disembarkation of its light scale of vehicles and equipment by nightfall on 10 June. Two guns out of each four-gun Troop were towed by 3-tonner ammunition lorries instead of their normal Quad gun tractors, and some personnel had to walk. The forward observation officers (FOOs) deployed on 11 June in support of No. 46 (Royal Marine) Commando and the North Shore Regiment, who were clearing villages along the River Mue. Supported by concentrations from 191st Fd Rgt, these units took all their objectives before nightfall, and defensive fire (DF) missions broke up the German counter-attacks on 12 June.

On 13 June the regiment was switched to support 9th Canadian Infantry Brigade, which had just come into the line at Barbières. Each battery established an OP with one of the battalions: 532 Bty supporting The Highland Light Infantry of Canada at the western end of Les Buissons, 533 with the Stormont, Dundas and Glengarry Highlanders at Vieux Cairon, and 532 with The Nova Scotia Highlanders at the eastern end of Les Buissons. Once the DF tasks had been registered there was not much firing because of ammunition shortages. On 15 June the regiment's 'second residue' arrived with the remaining vehicles.

=== Operation Epsom ===
On 17 June the regiment moved to Bretteville-l'Orgueilleuse where in addition to supporting 9th Canadian Bde it was to take part in the barrage preceding Operation Epsom. Over 700 guns were assembled to support this attack around the western edge of Caen, but the operation was delayed until 26 June by a storm in the English Channel that disrupted the landing of supplies and reinforcements. The barrage began at 07.30 and continued (with pauses to allow the guns to cool) until 10.20, during which the regiment fired 11,000 rounds of High explosive shell (HE). It had been firing in support of 15th (Scottish) Division, which advanced towards the bridges over the River Odon but was held up by German strongpoints and lost the protection of the artillery's creeping barrage. By the end of the day they had established 'Scottish Corridor' but were still short of the bridges. The next day 191st Fd Rgt returned to its positions at Barbières.

=== Operation Charnwood ===
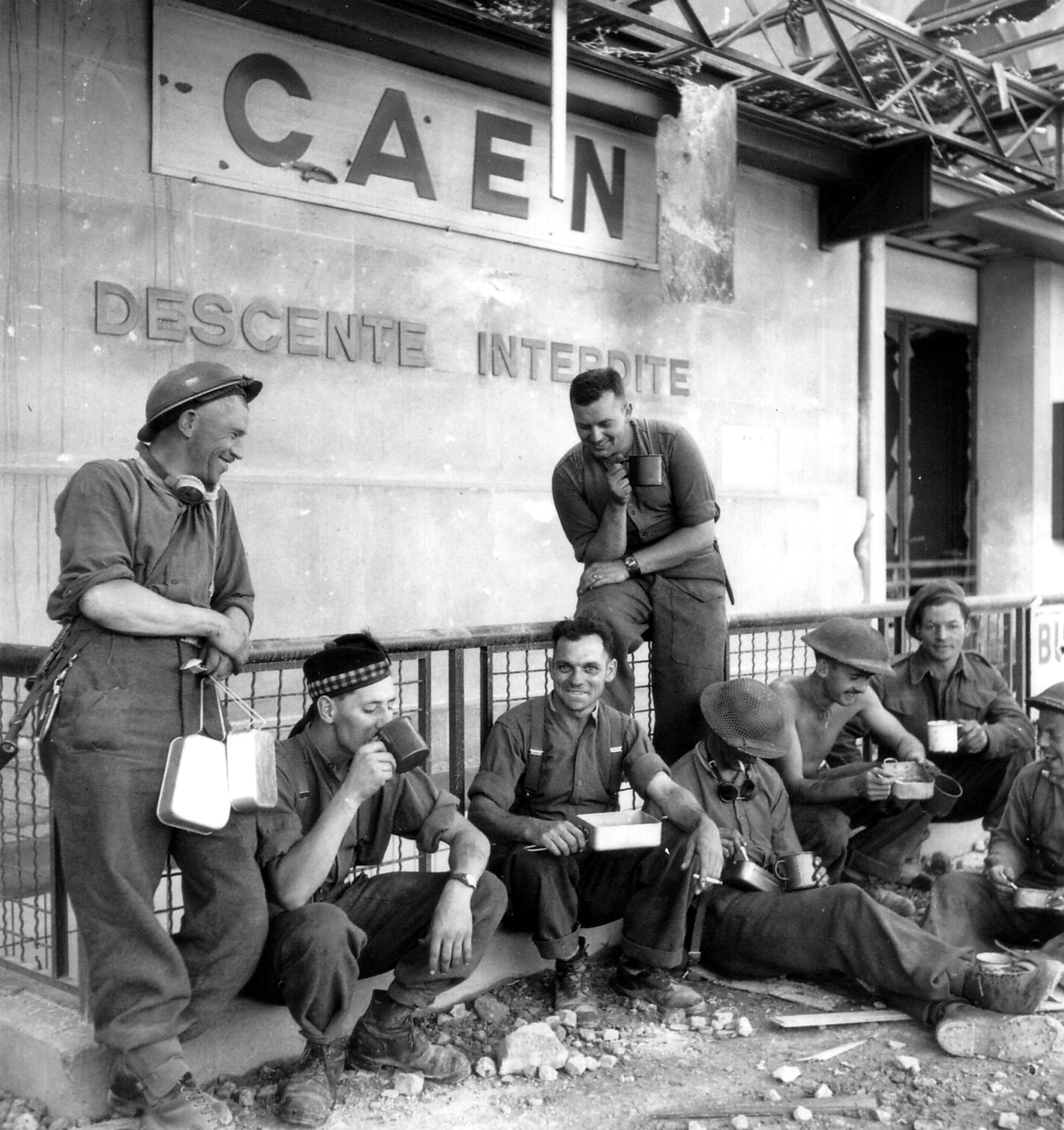
Stormont, Dundas and Glengarry Highlanders resting at Caen station, July 1944.

191st Field Rgt fired in support of 8th Canadian Infantry Brigade in its attack on Carpiquet Airfield on 4 July, and then prepared for Operation Charnwood on 8 July. For this attack on Caen, the whole regiment was supporting a single battalion, the Stormont, Dundas and Glengarry Highlanders. I Corps' barrage opened at 04.20 for 90 minutes, then the FOOs advanced with the Canadian battalion, calling down fire as required. A protective barrage was laid while the leading infantry company dealt with a minefield on the way to Gruchy, and later in the day the right hand company advanced behind a barrage from 191st to capture the isolated Chateau de St-Louet. Late in the day the North Nova Scotia Highlanders attacked Franqueville, and 191st switched to support this attack, followed by DF tasks to ensure that the Canadians could hold the positions captured. At the end of the day I Corps called a 'Victor' target (all available guns) on the German troops and vehicles streaming out of Caen in retreat.

The Stormont, Dundas and Glengarry Highlanders spearheaded the next day's attack supported by 191st Fd Rgt's guns, even though these had been unable to get forward and the FOOs were now at the extreme range of their radios. As the Canadians slowly cleared the houses of Caen, Lt-Col Hope with Maj Pearson of 532 Bty got ahead of them and were the first Allied troops to reach the Abbaye aux Hommes and liberate thousands of refugees sheltering there. By 12.45 Carpiquet Airfield had been cleared and 191st's guns could get forward. The regiment fired several concentrations on enemy pockets south of the River Orne on 10 July.

=== Operation Goodwood ===
There was a regrouping of artillery after the fighting in Caen, with 191st Fd Rgt returning to the command of 4th AGRA and moving north-east of Caen to support 6th Airborne Division along the lower Orne. FOOs joined 4th Special Service Brigade (532 Bty) and 1st Special Service Brigade (533 Bty). This front was quiet, and on 17 July 191st Fd Rgt came under the command of 51st (Highland) Division for Operation Goodwood. This operation opened with a massive bombing programme by RAF Bomber Command and the US Eighth and Ninth Air Forces, assisted by a 'flak suppression' barrage by the British and Canadian artillery on every known German anti-aircraft ('Flak') position. Once the heavy bombers left the area, the artillery switched to engaging every known German artillery position. 191st Field Rgt played a full part in these bombardments, starting with flak suppression on the Colombelles factory area in the outskirts of Caen. Although the fighting went on for three days, 191st Fd Rgt's guns were out of range of most targets after the first afternoon.

On 20 July 191st Fd Rgt was switched across to 3rd British Division. Although the gun area was well behind 3rd Division's front line, its flank was overlooked by the enemy-held Bois de Bavent, only a mile away. From here the regiment was harassed by German mortar fire during the night: an ammunition stack on 533 Bty's position was set alight and cases of burning cartridges had to be dragged away from the HE shells, while a complete gun detachment of A Trp, 532 Bty was wiped out; the regiment suffered 19 casualties in one night. 534 Battery followed 3rd Division forward next morning, but the wagon lines were attacked by a German 88mm Self-propelled gun and on 22 July B Trp of 532 Bty was forced out of its position by continued mortaring. On 26 July the regiment was transferred to support 6th Airborne Division once more, 532 Bty with 1st Special Service Bde, 533 Bty with 3rd Parachute Brigade. The regiment stayed here under occasional harassing fire for three weeks. By now First Canadian Army HQ was operational, and had taken command of I Corps and other British troops along the coastal flank of 21st Army Group as well as the Canadian troops.

=== Operation Paddle ===
As the German front in Normandy crumbled, 6th Airborne Division began to follow up along the coast (Operation Paddle), and 191st Fd Rgt supported the Special Service and Parachute brigades in a series of small operations across rivers and through villages until they reached Pont-Audemer on 26 August. 6th Airborne Division was relieved at this point, but Lt-Col Hope attached 191st Fd Rgt to 49th (West Riding) Division to continue the pursuit to the Seine.

=== Operation Astonia ===
The regiment now reverted to the command of 4th AGRA, first accompanying a reconnaissance by 4th Special Service Bde towards Le Havre (the regiment discovering and crossing a partly demolished bridge over the Seine on 31 August), then taking part in the full-scale attack on that port on 10 September (Operation Astonia). This was carried out in under 48 hours supported by specialist armour, air attack, and massive artillery concentrations. 191st Field Rgt took part in the harassing fire (HF) and counter-battery (CB) tasks before the attack, and then supported 34th Tank Brigade. The FOOs were up with the leading troops, bringing down fire as required. Lieutenant-Colonel Hope was later awarded the Distinguished Service Order (DSO) for his work as artillery adviser to the commander of 34th Tank Bde during the street-fighting on 11 September.

After a few days out of the line, 191st Fd Rgt moved up the coast to join 4th Special Service Bde besieging the isolated German garrison in Dunkirk. Supply lines were now stretched, and the regiment's Royal Army Service Corps transport detachment had to run a shuttle service bringing ammunition and rations from Fécamp, many miles to the west.

== Scheldt campaign ==
The strategic requirement now was to clear the Scheldt Estuary and get the port of Antwerp into use as an Allied supply base. On 8 October, 191st Fd Rgt was ordered to rejoin I Corps at Turnhout in Belgium. Here Lt-Col Hope was appointed artillery adviser to 4th Special Service Bde in 'Force T' for the planned attack on Walcheren, while the second-in-command, Major Proudlock, was left in command of the regiment, which would form part of 'Clarkeforce'. This was a mobile force commanded by Brigadier W.S. Clarke of 34th Tank Brigade.

=== Clarkeforce ===
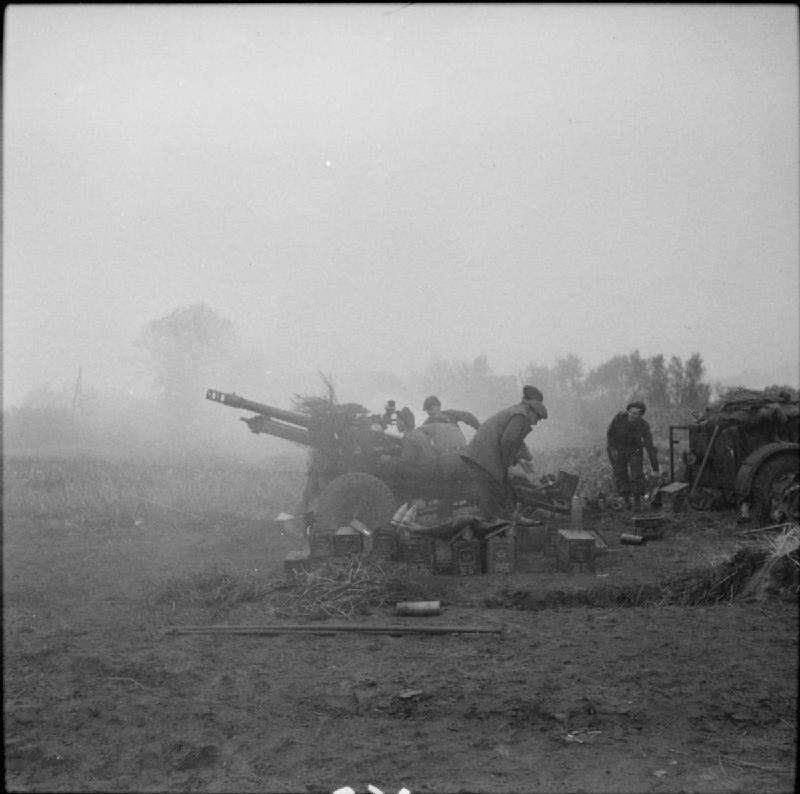
25-pounder in action, October 1944.

49th (West Riding) Division was to attack towards Loenhout, and then unleash Clarkeforce to exploit the breakthrough and move up the main road to Wuustwezel in Operation Rebound part of the much larger operational offensive codenamed Pheasant. Clarkeforce consisted of Churchill tanks of 107th Regiment Royal Armoured Corps carrying infantry of the 1st Battalion, Leicestershire Regiment, accompanied by a troop of Achilles self-propelled 17-pounders from 248 Bty, 62nd (6th London) Anti-Tank Regiment, Royal Artillery, and a troop of Churchill Crocodile flamethrowing tanks of the 1st Fife and Forfar Yeomanry. The field artillery support was provided by 191st Fd Rgt. Operation Rebound started with a barrage fired by the field regiments of 49th (WR) Division reinforced by two medium regiments, then Clarkeforce was launched at 16.00 on 20 October, bypassing some strongpoints to be mopped up by supporting troops, and reached 'Stone Bridge'. The fight for this point, supported by fire from 191st Fd Rgt, took most of the remaining afternoon, but the bridge was seized before it could be completely demolished, and Clarkeforce pushed across it and into Wuustwezel from the rear. The tanks then pushed on in the darkness until halted by roadblocks.

107th RAC moved on at 0800 the following morning towards Nieuwmoer, led by A Squadron of 49th (West Riding) Reconnaissance Regiment RAC. Meanwhile, the troops round Stone Bridge, including 191st Fd Rgt, had to beat off counter-attacks by German armour. 532 Battery, which had already crossed over, were called upon to deploy and fire in an anti-tank role. The spearhead of Clarkeforce was held up by enemy-held woods, and at last light, Major Proudlock called in fire from every divisional and AGRA gun within range (about 200) to devastate this woodland. On 22 October, the advance continued towards Esschen, 191st Fd Rgt moved up to Nieuwmoer, despite pockets of enemy resistance along the route, which ambushed some of the force's rear echelon vehicles. After clearing the enemy pockets, Clarkeforce rested on 24 October to plan the next phase of its advance (Operation Thruster).

Before Clarkeforce was launched again, 56th Infantry Bde prepared the way by advancing from Esschen to Nispen during the night of 25/26 October. After supporting this advance, 191st Fd Rgt's FOOs rejoined Clarkeforce for its push towards Brembosch the following morning against strong enemy rearguards. The guns moved forward to Esschen to cover this advance, which involved crossing a massive anti-tank ditch and driving off enemy armour. Major Proudlock was awarded the DSO for his work under fire to direct the artillery support, which involved three field, two medium and two heavy anti-aircraft regiments as well as his own. By 31 October, Clarkeforce and 56th Bde. accompanied by 191st Fd Rgt, had moved through Wouw and reached Roosendaal. 49th (WR) Division's final objective was Willemstad on the Hollands Diep (part of the Maas Estuary). This was 10 miles (16 km) away across poor country for armour, so Clarkeforce was disbanded and the division carried out a conventional infantry advance (Operation Humid), supported by 191st Fd Rgt firing from the outskirts of Roosendaal. Willemstad was liberated on 6 November after the German garrison withdrew across the Maas.

=== Moerdijk ===
The only remaining German bridgehead across the Hollands Diep was at Moerdijk. On 7 November 1st Polish Armoured Division arrived to attack this pocket, and at dawn the following day the attack went in, supported by 191st Fd Rgt's gunners 4 miles (6.4 km) away near Zevenbergen, who noted the steady increase in range called for by the FOOs as the Poles advanced rapidly. However, they were unable to prevent the Moerdijk bridges being destroyed. The regiment was then billeted round Etten, but on 13 November, a composite battery (532 Bty with an additional Trp) left to support 22nd Canadian Armoured Regiment mopping up odd pockets of Germans marooned south of the Maas, while the following day F Trp of 534 Bty moved near to Willemstad to support 18th Canadian Armoured Car Regiment patrolling the south bank of the Maas. Lastly, B Trp of 532 Bty and D Trp of 533 Bty supported a thin screen of 51st (H) Division watching the islands of Duiveland and Overflakkee in the Lower Scheldt.

== Disbandment ==
By now 21st Army Group was suffering from a severe shortage of reinforcements, and units were being disbanded. As the junior RA regiment in the theatre, 191st Fd Rgt was ordered to disband, the younger men being drafted to infantry units and specialists distributed to other RA units. On 2 December the regiment rendezvoused south of the Maas and fired off all its remaining ammunition at the enemy-held bank, including red, white and blue smoke shells. 191st (Herts and Essex Yeomanry) Rgt officially disbanded on 4 December 1944. Most of the technical assistants and driver-operators (still wearing their regimental badges) were formed into divisional counter-mortar observation teams for 43rd (Wessex), 49th (West Riding) and 52nd (Lowland) Divisions. The regiment had lost 15 men killed during the campaign.

== Insignia ==
In April 1943 Lt-Col Cochrane devised an arm badge for the regiment comprising the red shield bearing three golden seaxes from the Essex Yeomanry badge, surmounted by the golden hart of the Herts Yeomanry badge, embroidered on a green diamond (the Herts Yeomanry colour). Although strictly unofficial and not conforming to Army Council Instructions, the badge (worn on both arms) was well-regarded by members of the regiment who nicknamed it the 'Goat and Cutlasses'. Uniquely, it was adopted by the Commonwealth War Graves Commission instead of an authorised cap badge to be carved on the headstones of members of the regiment who died on service.

The regiment's vehicles initially carried the hollow red diamond badge of the 42nd Armoured Division. While serving with First Canadian Army it adopted that formation's vehicle mark of a rectangle equally divided into red, black and red horizontal stripes, but without the superimposed yellow maple leaf carried by Canadian units. The unit's arm of service mark was the number 186 in white on the red-over-blue square of the RA with a white bar at the base.

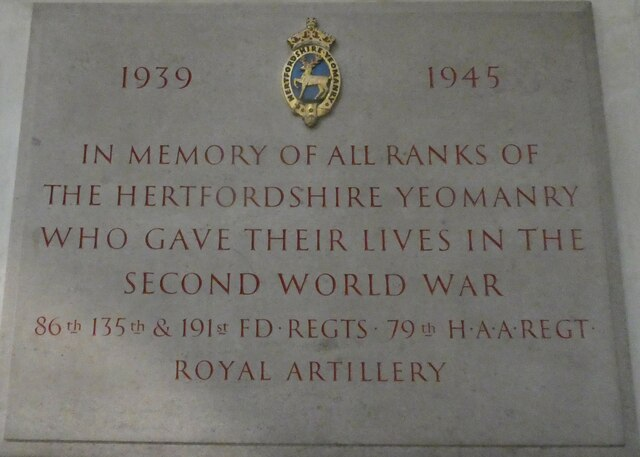
Herts Yeomanry 1939–1945 memorial.

== Memorial ==
191st Field Regiment is included on the Hertfordshire Yeomanry's World War II memorial tablet unveiled in St Albans Abbey on 19 September 1954.

== Notes ==
- John Buckley, Monty's Men: The British Army and the Liberation of Europe, London: Yale University Press, 2013, ISBN 978-0-300-13449-0.
- Paul Douglas Dickson, A Thoroughly Canadian General: A Biography of General H.D.G. Crerar, Toronto: University of Toronto Press, 2007, ISBN 978-0-8020-0802-2.
- Maj L.F. Ellis, History of the Second World War, United Kingdom Military Series: Victory in the West, Vol I: The Battle of Normandy, London: HM Stationery Office, 1962/Uckfield: Naval & Military, 2004, ISBN 1-845740-58-0.
- Major L.F. Ellis, History of the Second World War, United Kingdom Military Series: Victory in the West, Vol II: The Defeat of Germany, London: HM Stationery Office, 1968/Uckfield: Naval & Military, 2004, ISBN 1-845740-59-9.
- Gen Sir Martin Farndale, History of the Royal Regiment of Artillery: The Years of Defeat: Europe and North Africa, 1939–1941, Woolwich: Royal Artillery Institution, 1988/London: Brasseys, 1996, ISBN 1-85753-080-2.
- Col S.P. Foakes & Maj M. McKenzie-Bell (eds), Essex Yeomanry: A Short History, Essex: Temperley Media/Essex Yeomanry Association, nd, ISBN 978-0-9572333-0-0.
- Joslen, H. F. (2003) [1960]. Orders of Battle: Second World War, 1939–1945. Uckfield, East Sussex: Naval and Military Press. ISBN 978-1-84342-474-1.
- John Keegan, Six Armies in Normandy, From D-Day to the Liberation of Paris, London: Jonathan Cape 1982/Penguin 1983, ISBN 0-1400-5293-3.
- Lt-Gen H.G. Martin, The History of the Fifteenth Scottish Division 1939–1945, Edinburgh: Blackwood, 1948/Uckfield: Naval & Military Press, 2014, ISBN 978-1-78331-085-2.
- Alexander McKee, Caen: Anvil of Victory, London: Souvenir Press, 1964/Pan, 1966, ISBN 0-330-23368-8.
- Patrick Mileham, The Yeomanry Regiments: 200 Years of Tradition, 2nd Edn, Edinburgh: Canongate Academic, 1994, ISBN 1-898410-36-4.
- Lt-Col J.D. Sainsbury, The Hertfordshire Yeomanry Regiments, Royal Artillery, Part 1: The Field Regiments 1920-1946, Welwyn: Hertfordshire Yeomanry and Artillery Trust/Hart Books, 1999, ISBN 0-948527-05-6.
- Tim Saunders, Operation Epsom: Normandy, June 1944, Barnsley: Pen & Sword Books, 2003, ISBN 0-85052-954-9.

== External sources ==
- British Artillery in World War 2
- Imperial War Museum, War Memorials Register
- Land Forces of Britain, the Empire and Commonwealth – Regiments.org (archive site)
- Royal Artillery 1939–1945
- Royal Artillery Units Netherlands 1944–1945.
