= John Turner (architect) =

English architect

John Turner (1806–1890) was an English architect, noted for his ecclesiastical buildings.

== Life ==
John Turner was born in Holborn, London in 1806. He actively practised as an architect and surveyor in London between 1830 and 1868. before retiring to Rickinghall, Suffolk where he acted as a district surveyor.

A memoir of his life was written by his son, John Goldicutt Turner.

== Notable buildings ==
- Holy Trinity, Touchen End, Berkshire 1861–62. Nave with bellcote and chancel. In the Decorated style. The aisle windows all low, segment-headed and of three lights with reticulation units. Wooden posts between nave and south aisle on the pattern of Winkfield.
- St Peter, Church Road, Earley, Berkshire 1844. Grey vitrified brick.
- All Saints, Dunsden, Oxfordshire 1842
