= Touchen End =

Coordinates: 51°28′48″N 0°44′20″W

- Village
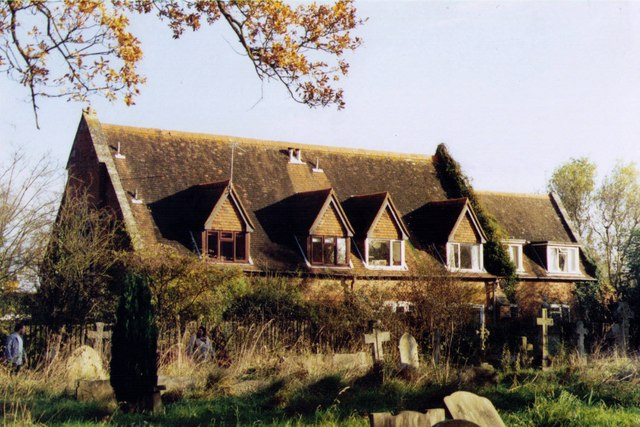
- The former Holy Trinity church

- Location within Berkshire
- Population: <100
- OS grid reference: SU875765
- Civil parish: Bray
- Unitary authority: Windsor and Maidenhead
- Ceremonial county: Berkshire
- Region: South East
- Country: England
- Sovereign state: United Kingdom
- Post town: MAIDENHEAD
- Postcode district: SL6
- Dialling code: 01628
- Police: Thames Valley
- Fire: Royal Berkshire
- Ambulance: South Central
- UK Parliament: Maidenhead

Touchen End, formerly written Touchen-end, is a village in the civil parish of Bray in the English county of Berkshire. It is situated about 3 miles (4.8 km) south of Maidenhead and 5 miles (8 km) west of Windsor and lies on the border of Bray and Waltham parishes.

== History ==
The earliest record of a settlement is from 1274 when it was called Twychene, however by 1360 it was registered as a tithing called Iwhurst. A man called John de Iwhurst first moved to the area in 1293 and his family remained until at least 1540. By 1607, Twychene was part of Fines Bailiwick, an area of Windsor Forest owned by the Manor of Feens and Woolley. An ancient road from Touchen End to the Manor at Maidenhead Thicket can be identified running through Paley Street, Heywoods Manor and Breadcroft Lane.

== Toponymy ==
The settlement's earliest name, Twychene, is possibly a corruption of 'two chain' where chains were stretched across road junctions to enable a toll to be levied. As the village lies on the junction of the A330 and the B3024 this is a plausible explanation. Another theory is that the Touchen End has evolved from a shortening of Tutchin Lane End meaning a hamlet at the fork of a road, twicen(e) being Old English for fork of a road. In the years since 1274 the village has been recorded on maps and referred to in documents which show the evolution of the name:

Name	Date	Source
Twychene	1274–1353	Rentals and Surveys
Twichene	1314–1316	Ministers Accounts
La Twichen	1316	Calendar of Fine Rolls
La Twychene	1338/9	Calendar of Fine Rolls & Introduction to the Survey of English Place Names 1924
Twechene	1401/2	Feudal Aids
Twechen	1426/7	Court Rolls (Bray)
Towchinge	1586	Rentals and Surveys
Tutcham Lane	1641	State Papers Domestic
Tutchin Lane End	1711	A Letter containing an account of some antiquities between Windsor and Oxford, T. Hearne
Tutchin Lane	1761	A Topographical Survey of the County of Berkshire, J. Rocque, 1761
Tutchin Lane	1790	A topographical Map of the Town of Reading and the Country adjacent to an Extent of Ten Miles, Thomas Pride, 1790
Tatchen Lane	1800	Map of Windsor Great Park and part of the Forest, Wm. Eden, 1800

== Holy Trinity Church ==
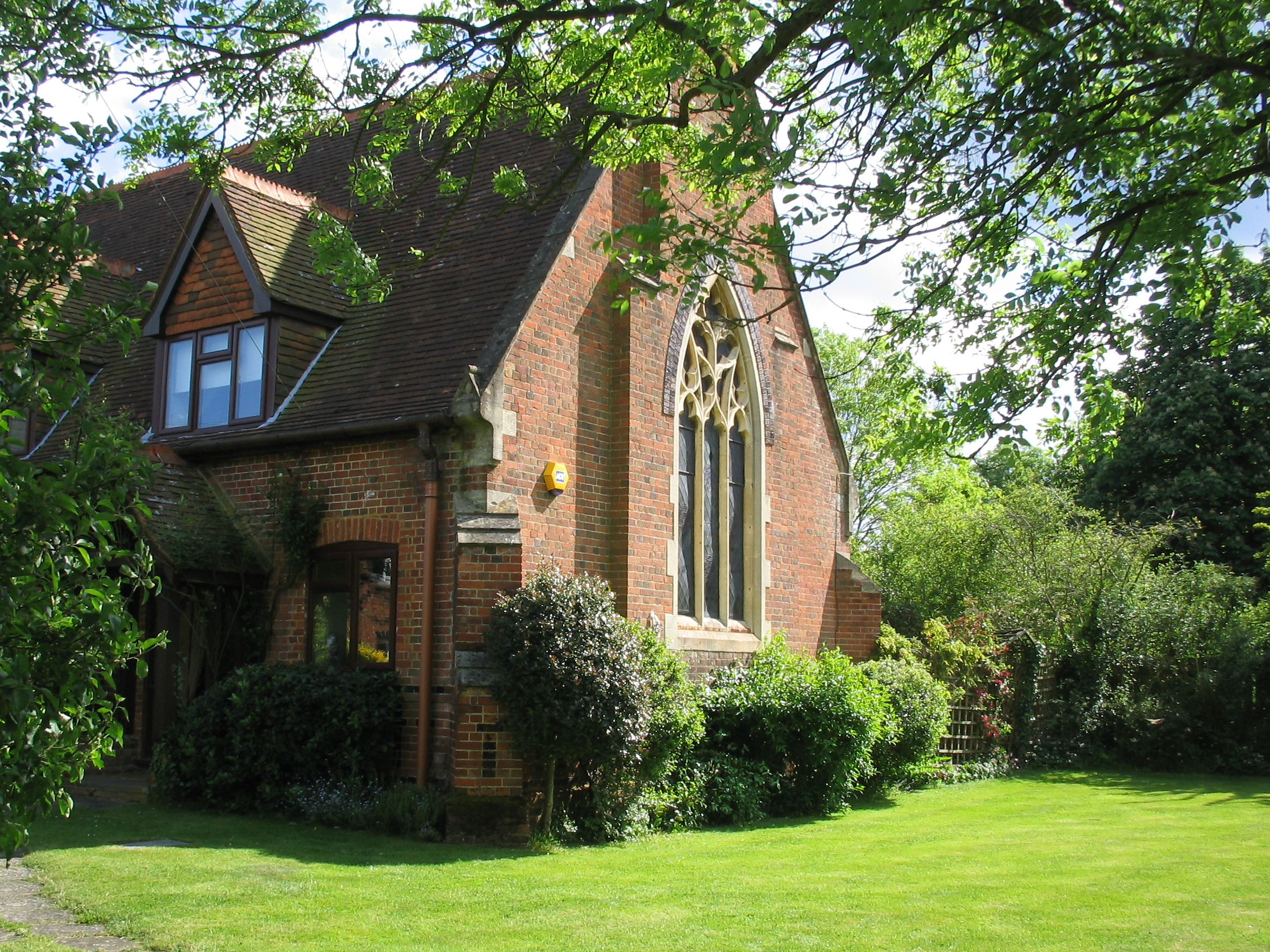
Holy Trinity Church as it is today

The village expanded in the mid-19th century with the building of an Anglican church, Holy Trinity, and an adjoining National School. The church was built in 1862 in the 14th-century style and is constructed of red brick with stone dressings and a tiled roof, the architect was John Turner. The stained glass windows "of a simple grisaille pattern" and fittings were designed by William White. Within five years the church was so overcrowded that a south aisle was built, paid for by public subscription including a donation from Queen Victoria.

In later years, it served as a chapel of ease to St Michael's, Bray until it was deconsecrated in the early 1970s. It is now, along with the school buildings, a private residence. The south aisle was demolished at the time of conversion and the east window, given by David Blackmore, is now in a prison chapel at Long Crendon, Buckinghamshire. The graveyard attached to Holy Trinity remains in use by the parish of Bray and is notable for the grave of William Thomas Forshaw VC.
