= Horace Birks =

British WWII general (1897–1985)

Major-General Horace Birks CB DSO
- Birks in 1946
- Born: 7 May 1897; Stoke Newington, London, England
- Died: 25 March 1985 (aged 87); New Forest, Hampshire, England
- Military career
- Allegiance: United Kingdom
- Branch: British Army
- Service years: 1915–1946
- Rank: Major-General
- Service number: 22474
- Units: Machine Gun Corps; Worcestershire Regiment; Royal Tank Corps
- Commands: 10th Armoured Division (1943–1944); 11th Tank Brigade (1942); 11th Armoured Brigade (1941–1942); 126th Infantry Brigade (1941)
- Conflicts: First World War; Second World War
- Awards: Companion of the Order of the Bath; Distinguished Service Order; Mentioned in Despatches (2)

Major-General Horace Leslie Birks, CB, DSO (7 May 1897 – 25 March 1985) was a senior officer of the British Army who saw active service during both the First World War and the Second World War, where he commanded the 10th Armoured Division.

== Military career ==
Educated at University College School, Birks volunteered for military service in the British Army, joining the London Rifle Brigade in 1915 during the First World War and, after serving on the Western Front, was commissioned as a second lieutenant into the Machine Gun Corps Heavy Branch in 1917 and fought at the Battle of Cambrai later that year.

Birks remained in the army after the war and was appointed an instructor at the Royal Tank Corps Schools in 1919. He was promoted to lieutenant in the Tank Corps in September 1923, with seniority dates back to July 1919.

After service in India and then as a General Staff Officer, grade 2 (GSO2) back in the United Kingdom at the War Office, he became an instructor at the Staff College, Quetta, in 1937.

Birks served in the Second World War as second-in-command of 4th Armoured Brigade in Egypt from 1940, then took command of the 126th Infantry Brigade from September 1941. The brigade was part of the 42nd (East Lancashire) Infantry Division and converted to an armoured role as the 11th Tank Brigade in 1942 and remained under Birks' command. It did not see active service as a unit, and spent the war in the United Kingdom, as part of the 42nd Armoured Division, before disbandment in late 1943. He went on to be General Officer Commanding (GOC) 10th Armoured Division in North Africa in January 1943 and commander of the Royal Armoured Corps for the Allied Central Mediterranean Force in Italy in 1944 before retiring from the army in 1946.

In an interview with the BBC in 1963, Birks detailed his involvement in the tank battles of the First World War.

== Bibliography ==
- Smart, Nick (2005). Biographical Dictionary of British Generals of the Second World War. Barnesley: Pen & Sword. ISBN 1844150496.

Military offices
Preceded by Charles Norman	GOC 10th Armoured Division; 1943–1944	Post disbanded
