= 147th Regiment Royal Armoured Corps =

147 Regiment Royal Armoured Corps (147 RAC) was an armoured regiment of the Royal Armoured Corps raised by the British Army in the Second World War. The regiment was created by the conversion of the 10th Battalion, Hampshire Regiment. The regiment served in North-west Europe from June 1944 to May 1945.

== Origin ==
The regiment was formed by converting the 10th Battalion, Hampshire Regiment, a war service battalion raised in July 1940 serving with the 201st Independent Infantry Brigade (Home), along with the 9th Hampshires. The regiment was commanded by Lt. Col. A.R.W.S. Koe. In common with all other infantry battalions that were transferred to the Royal Armoured Corps, the personnel continued to wear their Hampshire Regiment cap badges on the black beret of the Royal Armoured Corps. The regiment named their tanks after famous past battles fought by the Hampshire Regiment, the CO's tank being named "Minden".

== Service ==
The regiment, equipped with Churchill tanks, was assigned to the 34th Army Tank Brigade (34th Tank Brigade from June 1942) in December 1941. Serving alongside 147 RAC was the North Irish Horse and 153 RAC. In June 1942, the brigade became part of the 1st Mixed Division as part of an experiment with 'Mixed Divisions', of one armoured and two infantry brigades. In September, it was transferred to the 43rd Mixed Infantry Division, training in infantry-tank co-operation. However, in September 1943, the brigade became an independent brigade after the experiment with 'Mixed Divisions' was abandoned.

In late June 1944, 147 RAC was sent, with the rest of the brigade, overseas to France as part of the invasion of Normandy and fought in the Normandy Campaign in particular during Operation Greenline, part of the Second Battle of the Odon launched in mid-July. During the battle, 147 RAC suffered 47 casualties between 15–18 July. The regiment continued to serve with the brigade in Normandy until the breakout and later in the Siege of Le Havre (Operation Astonia), the Battle of the Reichswald (Operation Veritable, where the regiment suffered very heavy casualties and could only muster two weak squadrons) in February 1945, and the crossing of the River Rhine (Operation Plunder), when the Allies invaded Germany in March 1945. After Victory in Europe Day, on 8 May 1945, the regiment and brigade began preparing for service in the South-East Asian theatre. These preparations were halted as a result of the Japanese surrender.
