= William Forshaw =

Recipient of the Victoria Cross (1890–1943)

William Thomas Forshaw
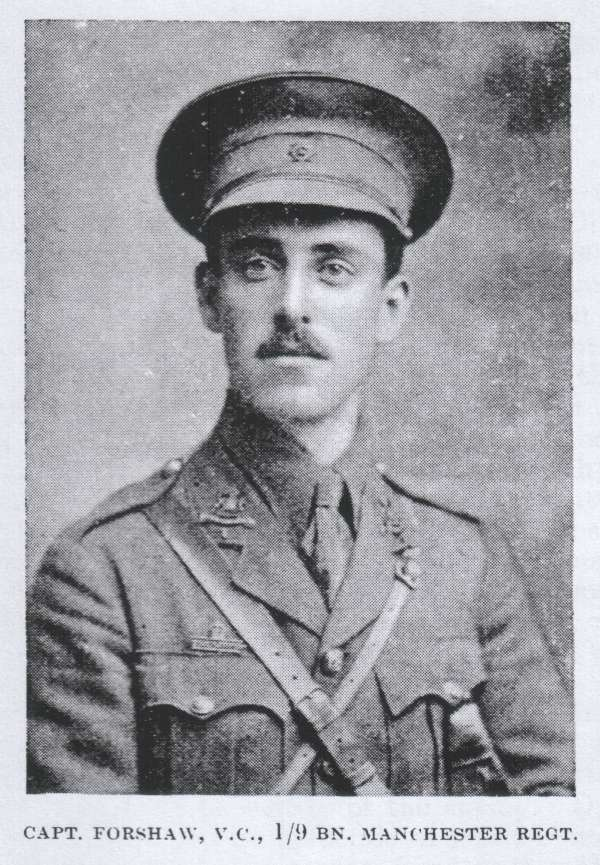
- Born: 20 April 1890; Barrow-in-Furness, Lancashire, England
- Died: 26 May 1943 (aged 53); Holyport, Berkshire, England
- Burial place: Touchen End Cemetery, Bray
- Military career
- Allegiance: United Kingdom
- Branch: British Army; British Indian Army
- Rank: Major
- Units: The Manchester Regiment; Home Guard
- Conflicts: World War I World War II
- Awards: Victoria Cross
- Other work: Teacher

Major William Thomas Forshaw VC (20 April 1890 – 26 May 1943) was an English recipient of the Victoria Cross, the highest and most prestigious award for gallantry in the face of the enemy that can be awarded to British and Commonwealth forces.

== Early life ==
Forshaw was born 20 April 1890 in Barrow-in-Furness. In civilian life Forshaw was a teacher and was teaching at the North Manchester School, a prep school for The Manchester Grammar School, immediately before the outbreak of the First World War.

== Military career ==
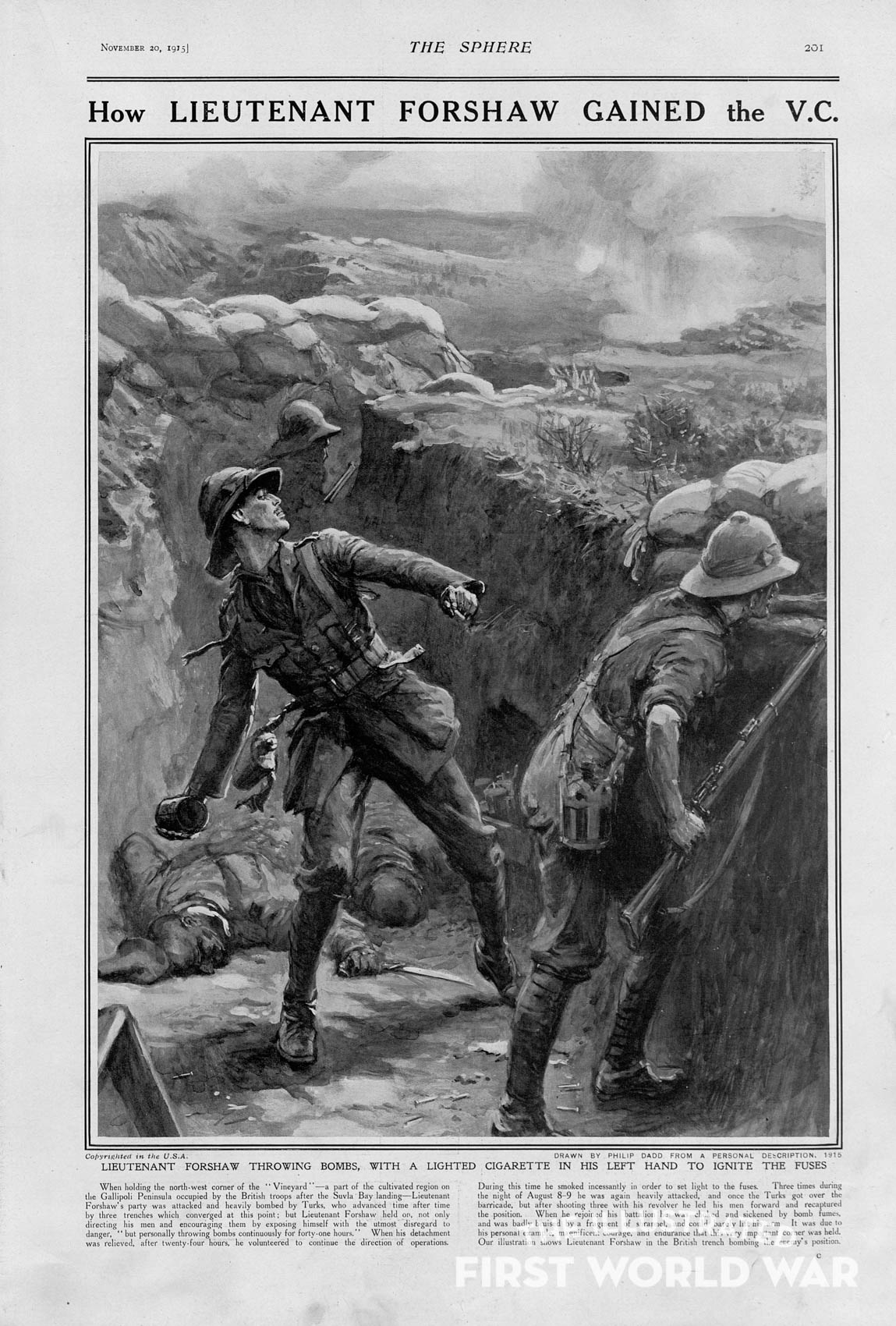
Drawing by Philip Dadd shows Lieutenant Forshaw throwing bombs with a lighted cigarette in his left hand to ignite the fuses

When he was 25 years old, and a Lieutenant (temporary Captain) in the 1/9th Battalion, Manchester Regiment, Territorial Force during the First World War, he was awarded the Victoria Cross for his actions between 7 and 9 August 1915 in Gallipoli, Turkey at the Battle of Krithia Vineyard. The London Gazette of 9 September 1915 reported

..when holding the north-west corner of "The Vineyard" against heavy attacks by the Turks, Lieutenant Forshaw not only directed his men but personally threw bombs continuously for over 40 hours. When his detachment was relieved, he volunteered to continue directing the defence. Later, when the Turks captured a portion of the trench, he shot three of them and recaptured it. It was due to his fine example and magnificent courage that this very important position was held.

He later achieved the rank of Major.

He died on 26 May 1943 and was buried at Touchen End, Berkshire in an unmarked grave. For many years the grave was unmarked but a new stone was erected in 1994 though not on the exact site.

His Victoria Cross and other campaign medals are displayed at the Museum of the Manchester Regiment, Ashton-under-Lyne, England in the Forshaw Room.

== See also ==
- List of Victoria Cross recipients by nationality
