= Walter Mills (VC) =

Recipient of the Victoria Cross

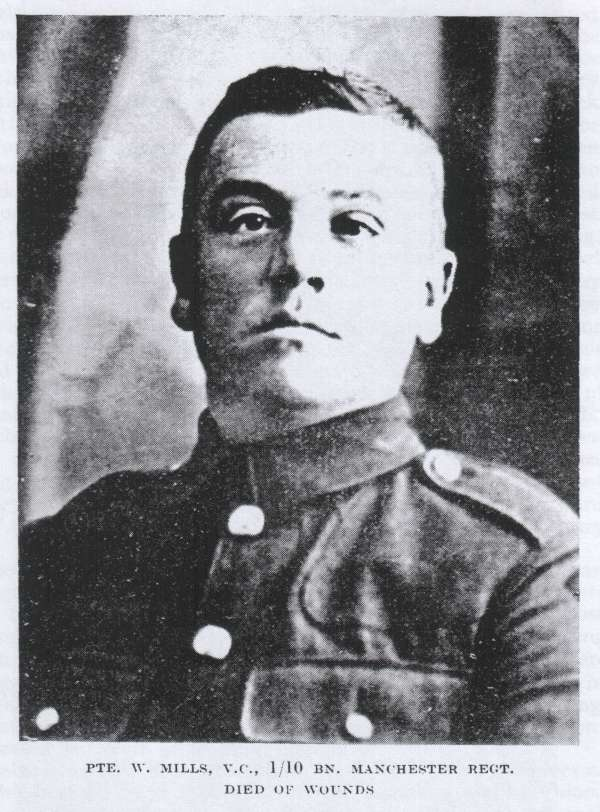
- Born: 21 July 1894; Oldham, Lancashire
- Died: 11 December 1917 (aged 23); Givenchy, France
- Burial place: Gorre British and Indian Cemetery, Beuvry
- Military career
- Allegiance: United Kingdom
- Branch: British Army
- Service years: -1917 †
- Rank: Private
- Units: The Manchester Regiment
- Conflicts: World War I
- Awards: Victoria Cross

Walter Mills VC (21 July 1894 – 11 December 1917) was an English recipient of the Victoria Cross, the highest and most prestigious award for gallantry in the face of the enemy that can be awarded to British and Commonwealth forces.

== Details ==
Mills was 23 years old and a private in C Company, the 1/10th Battalion, Manchester Regiment, in the British Army during the First World War when the following events occurred.

On 11 December 1917, while Private Mills was manning a position at Red Dragon Crater near Givenchy, France.

For most conspicuous bravery and self-sacrifice.

When, after an intense gas attack, a strong enemy patrol endeavoured to rush our posts, the garrisons of which had been overcome, and though badly gassed himself, he met the attack single-handed and continued to throw bombs until the arrival of reinforcements, and remained at his post until the enemy's attacks had been finally driven off.

While being carried away he died from gas poisoning. It was solely due to his exertions, when his only chance of personal safety lay in remaining motionless, that the enemy was defeated and the line remained intact.

Mills was buried at Gorre British & Indian Cemetery, Nr Bethune, Pas-De-Calais, France.

His VC Medal was buried with his daughter Ellen, who died in 1934. On 11 December 2017 a commemorative plaque was laid at Oldham parish church in memory of Walter Mills.

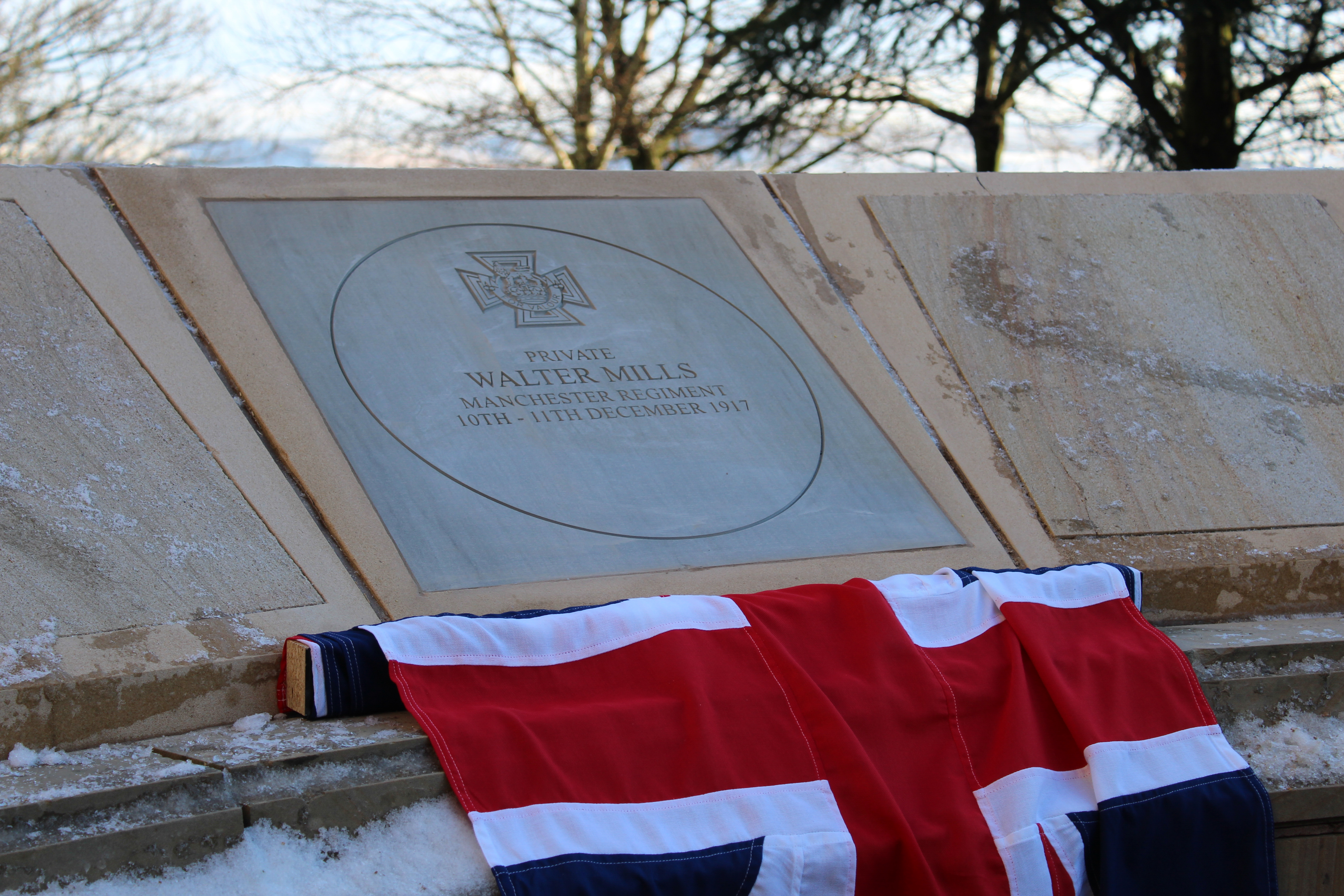
Stone laid in memory of Walter Mills on the anniversary of him receiving the Victoria cross.

== Bibliography ==
- Gliddon, Gerald (2004) [2012]. VCs of the First World War: Cambrai 1917. The History Press. ISBN 978-0-75-247668-1.
