= 151st Regiment Royal Armoured Corps =

- Active: 1941–1943
- Disbanded: 1943
- Country: United Kingdom
- Branch: British Army
- Type: Armoured Regiment
- Role: Infantry Support
- Part of: Royal Armoured Corps
- Equipment: Churchill tank

The 151st Regiment Royal Armoured Corps (10th Bn King's Own) (151 RAC) was an armoured regiment of the British Army's Royal Armoured Corps that was raised during the Second World War.

== History ==
=== Origin ===
The 151st Regiment RAC was formed on 1 December 1941 by the conversion to the armoured role of 10th Battalion, King's Own Royal Regiment (Lancaster), a hostilities-only infantry battalion raised in 1940. 10th King's Own had been serving in 225th Independent Infantry Brigade (Home), a Home Service formation, when it was redesignated 35th Army Tank Brigade. In common with most other infantry battalions that were transferred to the Royal Armoured Corps, all personnel would have continued to wear their King's Own cap badge on the black beret of the Royal Armoured Corps.

=== Training ===
Based at Prudhoe in Northumberland, the regiment began receiving Churchill tanks in February 1942.

In August 1942 151 RAC was transferred to Westgate-on-Sea in Kent to serve with 25th Army Tank Brigade in 43rd (Wessex) Infantry Division, (at that time training as a 'mixed' division). Shortly afterwards, 25th Tank Brigade was replaced by 34th Tank Brigade, and 151 RAC transferred to this formation.

During 1943 the regiment continued to be based at various places in Kent, training in the infantry tank role with 43rd (Wessex) and 59th (Staffordshire) Infantry Divisions, including wading trials for amphibious operations. One night in December 1943, while based at Folkestone, the regiment's camp was shelled by German artillery batteries on the French coast, and lost a few vehicles destroyed and damaged.

=== Disbandment ===
In autumn 1943 the decision was made disband surplus tank regiments. One of those selected was 107th Regiment RAC, which had been formed from the 5th Battalion, King's Own Royal Regiment (Lancaster). A 'token party' of three officers and 47 other ranks from 107 RAC was sent to 151 RAC. On 30 December 1943 151 RAC formally disbanded in order to adopt the number of 107 RAC – thus perpetuating the link with the 5th Battalion, King's Own, a permanent '1st Line' Territorial battalion as opposed to the 'hostilities-only' 10th Battalion that had become 151 RAC.

Under its new designation, the regiment served in Normandy, the Netherlands and Germany during the North-West Europe campaign, before disbanding in 1945.

== Bibliography ==
- George Forty, "British Army Handbook 1939-1945", Stroud: Sutton Publishing, 1998, ISBN 0-7509-1403-3.
- Joslen, H. F. (2003) [1960]. Orders of Battle: Second World War, 1939–1945. Uckfield, East Sussex: Naval and Military Press. ISBN 978-1-84342-474-1.
