= 110th Regiment Royal Armoured Corps =

110th Regiment Royal Armoured Corps (Border Regiment))
- Active: 1941–1943
- Disbanded: 1943
- Country: United Kingdom
- Branch: British Army
- Type: Armoured Regiment
- Role: Infantry Support; Training
- Part of: Royal Armoured Corps
- Anniversaries: Battle of Arroyo dos Molinos (28 October)
- Equipment: Covenanter; Churchill

The 110th Regiment Royal Armoured Corps (Border Regiment) (110 RAC) was an armoured regiment of the British Army's Royal Armoured Corps raised during the Second World War.

== Origin ==
110th Regiment RAC was formed on 1 November 1941 by the conversion to the armoured role of the 5th (Cumberland) Battalion, Border Regiment, a 1st Line Territorial Army infantry battalion. At the outbreak of war, 5th Border had been mobilised at Workington in 126th Infantry Brigade of 42nd (East Lancashire) Infantry Division, which were redesignated 11th Armoured Brigade (later 11th Tank Brigade) and 42nd Armoured Division respectively in November 1941. In common with other infantry units transferred to the Royal Armoured Corps, all personnel would have continued to wear their Border cap badge on the black beret of the Royal Armoured Corps. The regiment continued to add the parenthesis '(Border Regiment)' to its RAC title and celebrate the anniversary of the Battle of Arroyo dos Molinos during the Peninsular War (28 October 1811) as a regimental holiday.

== History ==
On conversion on 1 November 1941, 110 RAC was stationed at Skipton-in-Craven in West Yorkshire. It received its first tank (a Covenanter) in January 1942. In May, the regiment moved to Bingley and was ordered to convert from Covenanter cruiser tanks to Churchill infantry tanks, when 11 Armoured Brigade was detached from 42nd Armoured Division and became an independent Army Tank Brigade.

Later in the year, the regiment moved to North Yorkshire and trained around Bolton Castle, Hawes and Arkengarthdale. In July and August 1942, 110 RAC sent large drafts of officers and men for overseas service, and in January 1943 it (along with the whole of 11th Tank Brigade) was attached to 77th Infantry (Reserve) Division and given the role of holding and training reinforcements. In February 1943, it moved to Catterick and then in May to Otley, training in the Yorkshire Dales.

In Autumn 1943, the decision was made disband 11th Tank Brigade, without it ever having seen active service, and 110 RAC was broken up before the end of November. The 5th Battalion, Border Regiment was reconstituted in April 1944 by the redesignation of 7th Border, a reserve battalion serving in 213th Infantry Brigade It spent the rest of the war as a training battalion.

== External sources ==
- Land Forces of Britain, the Empire and Commonwealth (Regiments.org)
