= 9th Royal Tank Regiment =

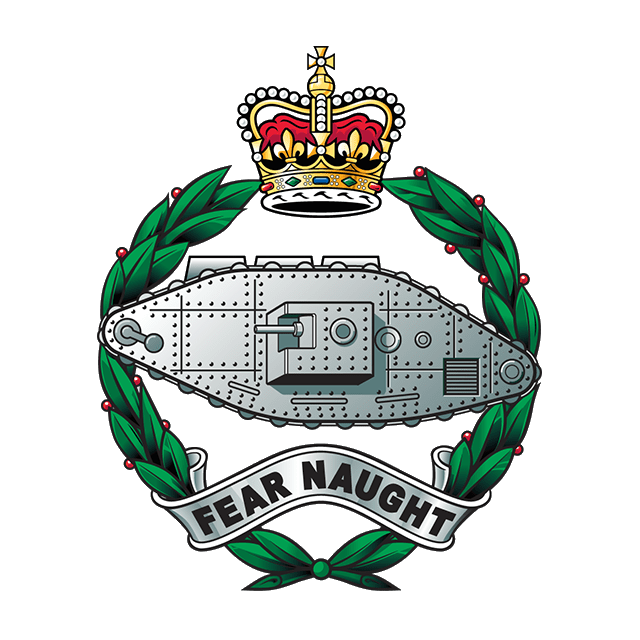
- Cap badge of the Royal Tank Regiment.
- Active: 27 November 1940–1946
- Country: United Kingdom
- Branch: British Army
- Type: Armoured
- Role: Heavy Tank Unit
- Size: Regiment
- Part of: Royal Armoured Corps
- Garrison/HQ: Otley, West Yorkshire
- Motto(s): Fear Naught Qui s'y frotte, s'y brule (Touch me, and you burn)
- Anniversaries: Cambrai Day, 20 November

Commanders
- Notable commanders: Lieutenant Colonel Sir Nugent Everard, Bart Lt. Col Peter Norman (Berry) Veale; Major James Douglas Haddow Ballantine

Insignia
- Tactical Recognition Flash

The 9th Royal Tank Regiment (9 RTR) was an armoured regiment of the British Army active during the Second World War. It was part of the Royal Tank Regiment, itself part of the Royal Armoured Corps. It was reformed in late 1940 as a hostilities-only regiment.

== History ==
The "original" 9th RTR was formed in December 1916 as the 9th Battalion, Heavy Branch Machine Gun Corps and was designated I Battalion. The unit served at the Battle of Cambrai where, along with III Corps of the Third British Army, achieved complete surprise and pushed the German forces out of the town.

Through the remainder of the War, the 9th were used to great effect, using the tactics they had learnt at Cambrai. The Battalion were awarded the Croix de Guerre avec Palmes as a regimental decoration, an honour that is shared with only three other units in the British Army, all of which are infantry.

The 9th were also awarded the honour of wearing the badge of General Bourgon's French 3rd Division. A replica of the badge was worn on the sleeve of everyone serving in the 9th Battalion, and later by everyone in the 9th RTR. The 9th took their unofficial motto from this badge: "Qui s'y frotte, s'y brule" which translates as "Touch me, and you burn".

Although the exact details are not known, the 9th was disbanded after the war ended.

The road to the 9th's reformation started in May 1940 when the majority of the 3rd Battalion RTR was destroyed near Calais, with only eight men returning to Britain. A number of the reinforcements intended for the 3rd Battalion RTR were hived off to become "a detachment of the 3rd Battalion", a Home Details Unit. Soon after this, in November 1940, the 9th Battalion RTR was created.

== Service during World War 2 ==
Despite forming in November 1940, it was not until mid-1941, when the regiment was based in Otley, that the 9th received the tanks it was to use in its role as a Heavy Tank Unit. The 9th RTR was one of the first units to be equipped with the Churchill. These vehicles were almost identical to those used by the Calgary Regiment of the Canadian Army at Dieppe in 1942.

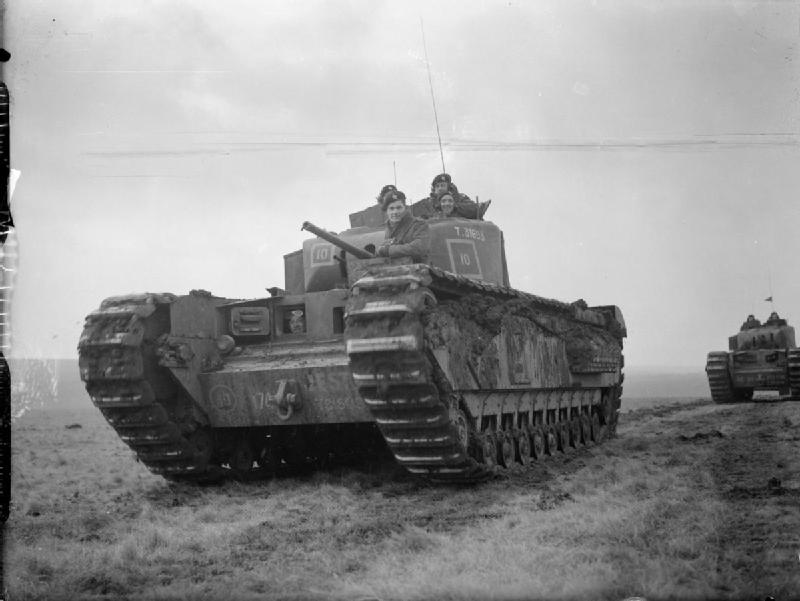
Churchill tank of 'B' Squadron 9 RTR during an exercise at Tilshead in the Salisbury Plain Training Area, 31 January 1942

Between 1941 and 1944, the regiment moved around the country, from Otley, to Eastbourne, South Lancing, Charing, and eventually Aldershot. Along with this, the regiment's tanks and their crews often moved around the country to various gunnery ranges, such as at Bovington Camp in Dorset and Castlemartin in Wales.

The 9th finally went into action shortly after D Day, (weather conditions had not permitted them to land on the planned date). Some of the regiment was able to get on shore on 19 June, but a large part was held up for another two days.

Shortly after its arrival in Normandy, 9th RTR (as part of 31st Tank Brigade), was involved in Montgomery's Operation Epsom, the push inland to secure the Normandy Beachhead and the city of Caen. The regiment was part of the right hand attack towards Grainville and Colleville, supporting 15th (Scottish) Infantry Division.

After Epsom, the 9th was part of Operation Jupiter, the attack on Hill 112. The Hill was defended by elements of Schwere Panzer-Abteilung 502, which led to heavy losses for the regiment, although eventually the Hill was retaken from the German Forces.

The next major engagement for the 9th was the Falaise pocket. The regiment supported the 1st Canadian Army for the first part of the battle. However, it was soon returned to British command for the push east across the north of France, to take bridges across a number of rivers in the area.

Following the rapid push east, the 9th RTR took part in the capture of Le Havre as part of Operation Astonia. In a combined assault of land, naval and air forces, the port city of Le Havre was taken in three days, despite being considered "one of the strongest fortresses of the Atlantic Wall". Unlike previous operations, the regiment took very light casualties. The end of Operation Astonia led to a fortnight's rest for the regiment, after they had been fighting for around 100 days.

After its rest period, 9th RTR moved into the Netherlands and took part in enlarging the Nijmegen Salient in support of the 51st (Highland) and 49th (West Riding) Divisions. Later on in the Dutch campaign, the 9th participated in Operations Rebound and Thruster, which led to the capture of Roosendaal and aided the clearing of the banks of the River Scheldt.

Between late December 1944 and the end of January 1945, 9th RTR aided in victory in the Ardennes, acting as a defensive force near Liege, under the command of the First US Army.

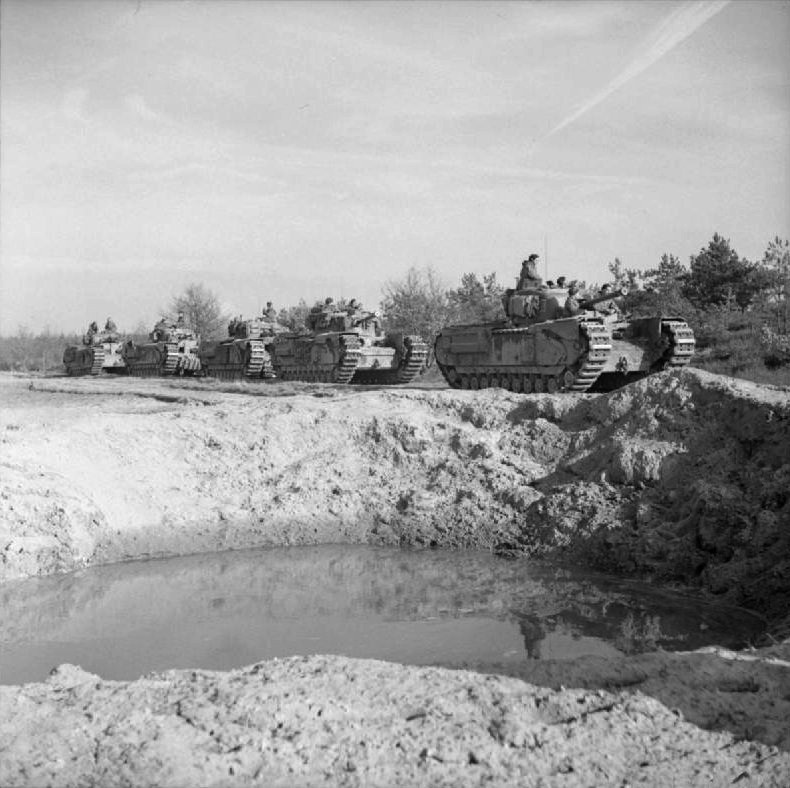
Churchill tanks of 9 RTR during the advance towards Goch, Germany, 19 February 1945

After the Ardennes, the 9th was attached to the 53rd (Welsh) Infantry Division for the battle in the Reichswald, during early to mid-February 1945. Following this, the 9th, in support of the 52nd Lowland Division, pushed further into Germany.

Between March and April, the 9th had an extended period of refitting and maintenance, repairing or replacing tanks that had travelled thousands of miles and participated in countless engagements, anticipating the final push across the Rhine. The assault never truly came, the final tasks for the 9th was to clear and secure a small area of Germany.

== Organisation ==
The main fighting element of the 9th RTR was split into the Regimental Headquarters consisting of six tanks and three squadrons, further split into Squadron HQs, which was made up of four tanks each, and five troops each with three tanks. In total, the 9th had 63 tanks, served by over 300 crew.

Alongside the fighting elements was the recce troop, equipped with Jeeps and Daimler Dingo Scout Cars, and the Supply Section, which was in charge of providing the regiment with equipment, food and spare parts for the regiment's tanks.

The structure of the Fighting Element of the regiment is shown below:

Regimental HQ:

CO	Second in Command (2 I/C)	Intelligence Officer (IO)	Adjutant	OP Tank 1	OP Tank 2
'Iron Duke'	'Ironside'	'Iron Ration'	'Ironclad'	'Invincible'	N/A

Fighting Squadrons:

A Squadron		B Squadron		C Squadron	
OC*	'Inverness'	OC	' Iroquois'	OC	'Incredible'
2 I/C	'Invergordon'	2 I/C	'Imperator'	2 I/C	'Ich Dien'
RO **	'Inverary'	RO		RO	
ARV***	'Iron Lung'	ARV		ARV	
1	'Impudent'	6	'Intact'	11	'Incisive'
1A	'Imp'	6A		11A	'Intensive'
1B		6B		11B	'Impassive'
2		7		12	'Ibn El Kelb'
2A	'Iceni'	7A		12A	'Infamous'
2B		7B		12B	'Ibn Saud'
3		8	'Infernal'	13	
3A	'Irate'	8A	'Inferno'	13A	'Independent'
3B	'Impetuous'	8B	'Infidel'	13B	
4		9	'Inspire'	14	'Indomitable'
4A	'Illusive'	9A	'Immune'	14A	'Indefatigable'
4B	'Ibex'	9B	'Impulse'	14B	
5	'Iraq'	10	'Intercept'	15	'Ilford'
5A	'Ismaila'	10A	'Immortal'	15A	'Ilkley'
5B	'India'	10B	'Imprint'	15B	'Irlam'

* Officer Commanding
** Reconnaissance Officer
*** Armoured Recovery Vehicle

=== Officers of note in 9th RTR ===
- Commanding Officer: Lieutenant Colonel Sir Nugent Everard, Bart
- Commanding Officer (European Campaign): Lieutenant Colonel Peter Norman (Berry) Veale(DSO, MC)
- Regimental Quartermaster: Lieutenant Quartermaster Roland Patrick
- A Squadron Commanding Officer: Major James Douglas Haddow Ballantine
- B Squadron Commanding Officer: Major Michael Reynell
- C Squadron Commanding Officer: Major Ronnie Holden (DSO, MC)
