= 3rd Manchester Rifles =

40th (3rd Manchester) Lancashire RVC 4th Volunteer Bn, Manchester Regiment 7th Bn, Manchester Regiment
- Active: 29 February 1860 – 31 December 1921
- Country: United Kingdom
- Branch: Territorial Force
- Role: Infantry
- Size: 1-3 Battalions
- Part of: 127th (Manchester) Brigade; 199th (Manchester) Brigade
- Garrison/HQ: Greenheys, Manchester
- Mottos: 'Defence, not defiance'
- Engagements: First World War: Third Battle of Krithia; Battle of Krithia Vineyard; Battle of Romani; Battle of Poelcapelle; Defence of Bucquoy; Battle of Albert; Battle of the Canal du Nord; Battle of the Selle

Commanders
- Notable commanders: Major John Snowdon Henry; Hon Algernon Egerton; Francis Egerton, 3rd Earl of Ellesmere

The 3rd Manchester Rifles, later the 7th Battalion, Manchester Regiment was a unit of Britain's Volunteers and Territorial Force raised in Manchester. It served at Gallipoli and on the Western Front in the First World War.

== Volunteer Force ==
The enthusiasm for the Volunteer movement following an invasion scare in 1859 saw the creation of many Rifle Volunteer Corps (RVCs) composed of part-time soldiers eager to supplement the Regular British Army in time of need. One such unit was the 3rd Manchester Rifles, which soon had five companies at 'Henry's', Cheetham Hill, Knott Mill, the Manchester, Sheffield and Lincolnshire Railway, and Newton Heath. 'Henry's' Company was raised by employees of A. & S. Henry, with Major John Snowdon Henry as the first commanding officer (CO) of the 3rd Manchesters. In December 1859 men connected with newspapers and publishing formed a Manchester Press Company, which enlisted 200 men, and another company was formed at Prestwich. The 3rd Manchesters were formally adopted on 29 February 1860 as the 40th (3rd Manchester) Lancashire RVC, and the whole unit paraded at Chetham's College Yard in April, when Major Henry announced that its motto would be 'Defence not Defiance'.

Many of the original volunteers were warehousemen and clerks; however, some mill owners refused to let their employees join, and by 1862 the unit's composition was 77 gentlemen and professionals, 129 tradesmen, 62 clerks, 347 artisans from foundries and 21 labourers. Together with the 1st and 2nd Manchester Rifles and the Ardwick Artizan Rifles (numbered as the 6th, 28th and 33rd Lancashire RVCs respectively) the unit made up an unofficial Manchester Brigade at the Volunteer reviews.

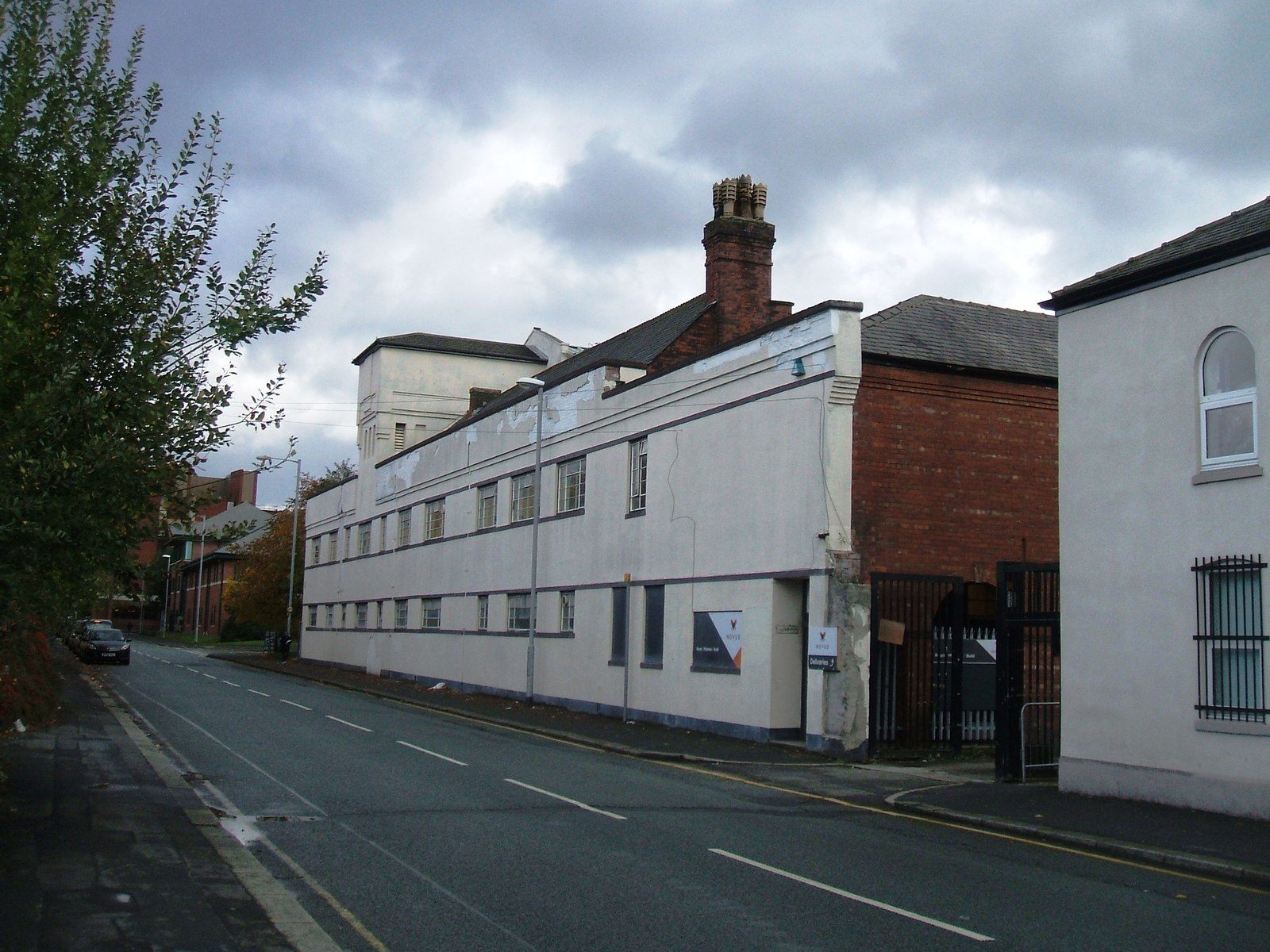
Burlington Street drill hall, as rebuilt in 1938

The Hon Algernon Egerton, younger son of the Earl of Ellesmere, and at the time Member of Parliament for South Lancashire, was commissioned as Lieutenant-Colonel of the new unit on 16 May 1860. He later became its Honorary Colonel, and in 1875 his nephew, Francis Egerton, 3rd Earl of Ellesmere became lieutenant-colonel commandant.

The unit's original headquarters (HQ) was at 11 Deansgate, Manchester, and it used the top storey of a large loom warehouse (up a flight of 100 steps) for drill. It moved its drill hall to 134 Deansgate in September 1881, but this was still unsatisfactory so the Earl of Ellesmere bought land in Burlington Street, Greenheys, where it could build a combined HQ and drill shed. A five-day 'Grand Bazaar' was organised in 1884 to raise funds for the construction, and the Burlington Street drill hall was opened in 1885.

In 1880, following disbandments and amalgamations of less successful units, the corps was renumbered as the 16th (3rd Manchester) Lancashire RVC. Under the 'Localisation of the Forces' introduced by the Cardwell Reforms, the 16th was linked with other Manchester-based RVCs, Militia regiments and the Regular 63rd and 96th Foot into Brigade No 16 (Lancashire). The 63rd and 96th Foot were amalgamated as the Manchester Regiment in 1881 as part of the Childers Reforms, and the 16th Lancashire RVC was formally attached to it on 1 July. The unit was redesignated as the 4th Volunteer Battalion, Manchester Regiment, on 1 September 1888. The uniform had been scarlet with Lincoln green facings, but now it adopted the white facings of the Manchesters. At this time the unit's strength was 12 companies. Under the mobilisation plan introduced by the Stanhope Memorandum in 1888, the Volunteer Battalions of the regiment constituted the Manchester Brigade.

== Territorial Force ==
When the Volunteers were subsumed into the new Territorial Force (TF) under the Haldane Reforms of 1908, the 4th Volunteer Battalion became the 7th Battalion, Manchester Regiment. The Manchester Brigade formed part of the East Lancashire Division of the TF.

== First World War ==
=== Mobilisation ===
On the outbreak of war, the division was at its annual camp when the order to mobilise was received at 05.30 on 4 August. The units returned to their drill halls to mobilise, the men being billeted close by. On 20 August, having volunteered for overseas service, the division moved into camps for training, and on 9 September it entrained for Southampton to embark for Egypt.

On 31 August 1914, the formation of Reserve or 2nd Line units for each existing TF unit was authorised. Initially these were formed from men who had not volunteered for overseas service, and the recruits who were flooding in. Later they were mobilised for overseas service in their own right. From now on, the original battalion was designated the 1/7th Manchesters, and the 2nd Line the 2/7th; later a 3rd line battalion was formed.

=== 1/7th Battalion ===
The East Lancashire Division began to disembark at Alexandria on 25 September and the Manchester Bde went into garrison in that city. However, three companies of the 7th Bn were sent via Port Sudan to garrison Khartoum. Later, half of the company left at Alexandria was sent on to Cyprus. At first the division's role was simply to relieve Regular troops from the garrisons for service on the Western Front, but on 5 November Britain declared war on Turkey and Egypt became a war zone. In January the Manchester Brigade was concentrated at Cairo and initially the East Lancashire Division was assigned to guard to Suez Canal before being selected for the Gallipoli Expedition.

==== Gallipoli ====
On 3 May the 1/7th Manchesters under the command of Lt-Col H.E. Gresham embarked on the Ionian and landed on 7 May (a day late) at 'V' Beach at Cape Helles on the Gallipoli Peninsula. It moved forward that night to positions west of Krithia Bridge, and then on 11 May it took over the firing and support trenches in the Krithia Nullah sector. On 12 May the brigade made a feint attack to attract attention away from a movement elsewhere, and the following day two platoons of the 1/7th advanced 100 yards (91 m) but were unable to hold the ground and were forced to withdraw during the night.

On 25 May, the East Lancashire Division was formally designated 42nd (East Lancashire) Division, and the Manchester Brigade became 127th (Manchester) Brigade.

On 28 May, 1/7th Bn in conjunction with 1/8th Bn took part in a small operation that moved the line forward, and B and D Companies dug in during the night. The lines were now within assaulting distance of the nearest Turkish trenches, and a new attack (the Third Battle of Krithia) was launched on 4 June. After a bombardment starting at 08.00, the assault was launched at noon. The Manchester Brigade led 42nd Division's attack, with A and C Companies of 1/7th Bn on the right, and in this sector all went well to begin with: despite intense rifle and machine gun fire the brigade took all its first objectives, the second wave (B and D Companies) passing through and parties advancing up to 1,000 yards (910 m) into the Turkish fourth line. The Official History records that 'The Manchester Territorials, fighting like veterans, were all in high fettle'. There was almost nothing between them and Krithia, and beyond that the ultimate target of Achi Baba. However, things had gone disastrously wrong for 127 Bde's neighbours, and the Turks were counter-attacking both flanks. 1/7th Battalion's position on the right was quite untenable and the brigade was ordered to withdraw. Although the Manchesters held on to the first Turkish line they had captured, casualties had been severe: the battalion lost its CO, Maj Staveacre, who had been acting since Lt-Col Gresham was evacuated to Malta on 28 May. The Manchesters consolidated their position on 5 June and held off a Turkish counter-attack on 6 June before being relieved next day and going into reserve.

On 12 June the Manchester Brigade was withdrawn from the Gallipoli Peninsula and went to the island of Imbros for rest. It returned to Cape Helles on 22 June and 1/7th Bn went up to the firing line in the Krithia Nullah sector on 24 June. They held the Turkish trench they had captured while the formations on either flank attempted to improve their positions. The 1/7th Manchesters then spent the next six weeks alternating in the line with 1/5th and 1/8th Bns. On 5 July, 1/7th Bn helped to repulse a fierce Turkish attack on the neighbouring 29th Division, inflicting heavy casualties.

A new attack at Helles (the Battle of Krithia Vineyard) began in August. 29th Division attacked on 6 August, and 1/7th Manchesters was ordered to keep in contact with its right flank. Captain Fawcus, commanding the first line of the 1/7th, was unable to find any of the 29th Division, except a few stragglers whom he brought back to the British lines after dark.42nd Division delivered its main attack at 09.45 on 7 August, but despite the bombardment and assistance from machine guns and trench mortars, the leading troops of 1/7th Manchesters could only get forward about 50 yards. By 19.15 that evening the Manchesters were back in their old positions. 127th Brigade was temporarily unfit for service and its total strength was only that of a single battalion, though it relieved 125th (Lancashire Fusiliers) Brigade in the firing line near Krithia Nullah on 8/9 August. After a short rest and receiving a few drafts and returning casualties, the division was put back into the line on 19 August, still badly under strength and suffering from sickness.

In September the battalion was engaged in fatigues and trench digging. These new trenches were given names such as 'Burlington Street' and 'Greenheys Lane' reminiscent of the battalion's HQ. The battalion continued to take casualties from enemy fire and mines, and from sickness. Between 6 May and 4 November the battalion lost 163 officers and men killed, 402 wounded and 93 missing. It was finally evacuated from 'V' Beach for Mudros on 29 December.

==== Romani ====
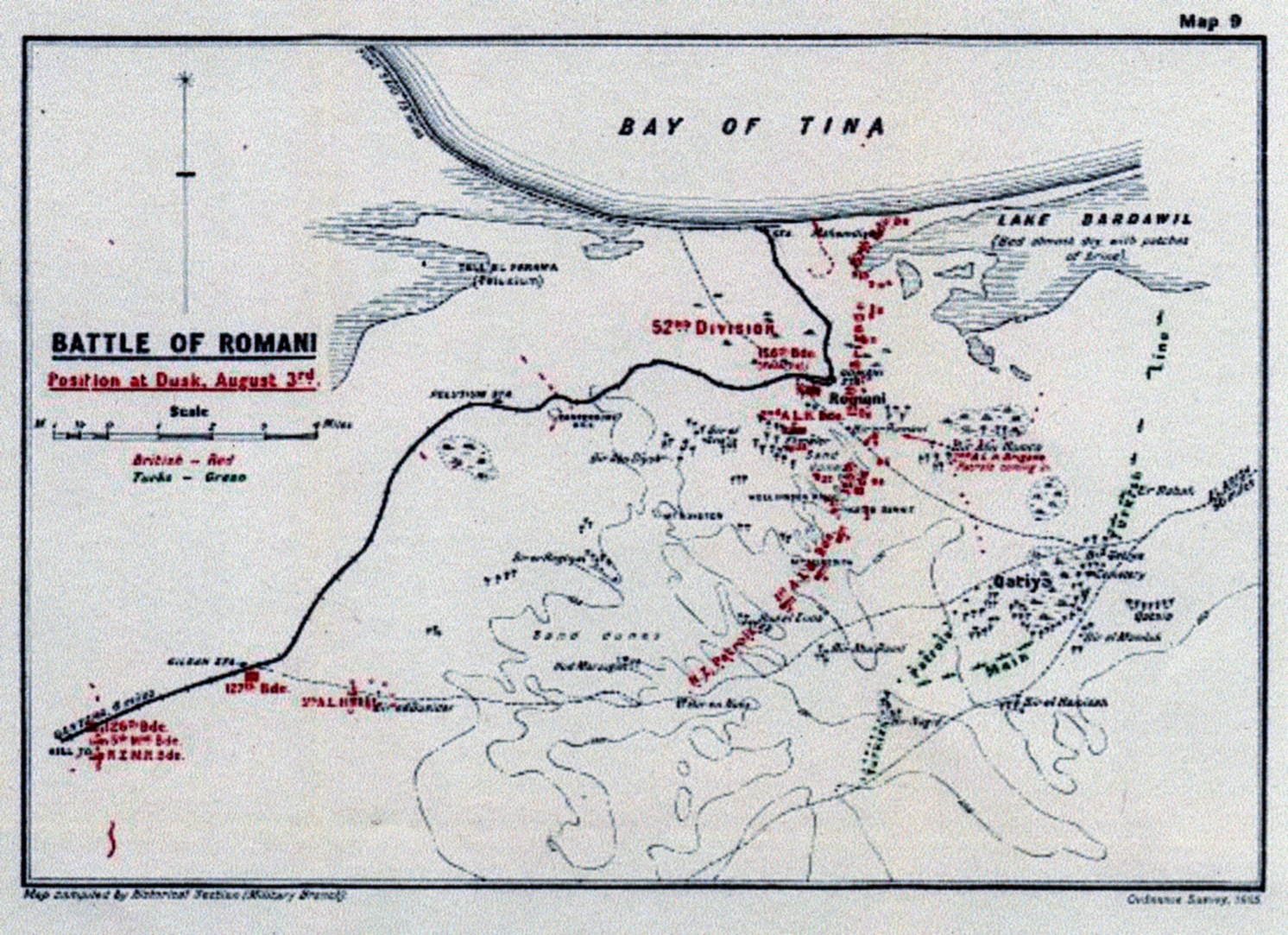
The Battle of Romani 3–4 August 1916.

The Gallipoli Campaign was shut down at the beginning of January, but 42nd Division remained on Mudros until the middle of the month before returning to the Egyptian Expeditionary Force (EEF) and the Suez Canal defences. From February to 1916 it was stationed at Shallufa, base for the Southern Sector of the defences, broken by spells of training in the desert. In June the division was moved to the Central Sector, between Ismailia and Qantara, where the 1/7th Manchesters were attached to 52nd (Lowland) Division. In July, 42nd Division became part of a Mobile Column formed to counter a threatened Turkish thrust across the Sinai desert before it reached the canal. 127 Brigade was the advanced brigade of this force, and 1/7th Bn rejoined. On

4 August artillery fire was heard as the Battle of Romani began, and 127 Bde was rushed by railway up to Pelusium where 1/6th Manchesters were preparing defences. The newly arrived battalions passed through 1/6th Manchesters to support the Anzac Mounted Division, which was heavily engaged. The Manchesters marched rapidly through the desert in the hottest part of the day, 1/7th Bn leading on the left, but the battle was already over when they arrived. Camels carrying vital water and supplies only reached the front line troops at the end of the day. During 5 and 6 August the brigade pursued the defeated Turkish force, suffering badly from extreme heat and lack of water, with many men falling out through exhaustion, until it reached Qatiya.

During the Autumn the railway and water pipeline were pushed forward, and 42nd Division participated in the EEF's Advance to Wadi el Arish, which began in late November 1916 and completed the Sinai Campaign in January 1917.

==== Western Front ====
42nd Division was now ordered to the Western Front. In early February 1917 it returned to Egypt and by 2 March the last troopship had left for France. The troops were concentrated at Pont-Remy, near Abbeville, and re-equipped; the Short Magazine Lee-Enfield rifle was issued in place of the obsolescent long model with which the battalions had gone to war. The division was employed on working parties in the area abandoned by the Germans when they retired to the Hindenburg Line, and then the brigades started taking turns in the line near Havrincourt Wood. On the night of 8/9 June all four battalions of the Manchesters went into No man's land to dig a new trench 300 yards (270 m) closer to the enemy line, which was completed and occupied the following night. The battalions also carried out regular night patrols and raids. At the end of June, 1/7th Manchesters was ordered to raid 'Wigan Copse'. After special training and with a supporting artillery barrage, 'a model raid' was made by Lt A. Hodge and his platoon on the night of 3 July, securing prisoners for no loss.

From 9 July to 22 August the division was in reserve, with 127 Bde stationed at Achiet-le-Petit undergoing intensive training. It then moved to the Ypres Salient to join the Third Ypres Offensive, passing through the Menin Gate on the night of 1 September. On 6 September the Manchesters supported an attack by 125 (Lancashire Fusiliers) Bde, which failed with heavy casualties.

After 18 days in the Salient, the division was relieved and moved to the Nieuport Sector on the Belgian coast, where it remained under constant shellfire until November. It then moved to the La Bassée–Béthune sector where it spent the winter building concrete defences to replace the existing poor breastworks. The BEF was now suffering a manpower crisis, and in February 1918 around a quarter of its battalions were disbanded to reinforce others; the Manchesters absorbed drafts from the disbanded 2/8th and 2/10th Bns.

==== Spring Offensive ====
When the German spring offensive opened on 21 March 1918, 42nd Division was in reserve, and on 23 March it was sent south in motor buses to reinforce Third Army. 127 Brigade debussed at midnight on the Ayette–Douchy road and set up an outpost line. The following day the division was ordered to relieve 40th Division, and 127 Bde advanced in artillery formation across open ground to take up its positions. At dawn on 25 March the Germans attacked, making some penetrations but being stopped by the Manchesters. Heavy fighting followed all day but at nightfall the division was still holding the line that it occupied.

By 26 March the enemy was working round the division's flanks, and it was ordered to pull back to the Bucquoy–Ablainzevelle line; 127 Bde slipped away unnoticed. The German advance was held in front of Bucquoy, despite heavy shellfire and the weariness of the troops. The first stage of the German offensive had been checked, although shellfire and raiding continued along the line until the division was relieved on 8 April.

When the division returned to the line front, the Third Army line was relatively quiet, the Germans having switched their offensive to the north. The policy was now to advance the line by means of small raids and aggressive patrolling (so-called 'peaceful penetration'). On 16 June a party of four officers and 80 other ranks of 1/7th Manchesters raided 'Fusilier Trench'; as they withdrew, Sergeant A.S. Fleetwood carried out a wounded comrade, reaching safety 20 minutes after the rest of the raiders. On the night of 19/20 July Lieutenant N. Edge led a party of 38 men of the battalion to capture and consolidate an enemy post 500 yards (460 m) in front of the British line. The following night three officers and 125 other ranks of the battalion captured the enemy trench system known as 'The Triangle', and then drove off a German counterattack the following morning. During the second half of July, 127 Bde advanced more than 2,000 yards (1,800 m) by these means. That month the division was struck by the flu epidemic, but did receive some drafts: on 31 July the 1/7th Manchesters absorbed the remaining cadre of the 2/7th Manchesters from 66th Division (see below), and thereafter was simply referred to as the 7th Bn.

==== Hundred Days Offensive ====
The Allied counter-offensive began with the Battle of Amiens (8–12 August), as a result of which the Germans began to give ground, and 42nd Division followed up against rearguards. One the night of 12/13 August, as 127 Bde took over a line of advanced outposts that had been occupied that day, a heavy German counter-attack was launched but was repulsed with great loss. Third Army began its formal assault (the Battle of Albert) on 21 August. 125 Brigade advance behind a creeping barrage onto its first objective, then the barrage switched to precede 127 Brigade advancing with 7th Manchesters on the left. Assisted by morning mist, the Manchesters took their first objective, and then cleared the ravine in which the Beaucourt–Puisieux road ran, the men getting to close quarter fighting with the defenders. However, it took two attempts for the brigades to take their third objective, the Manchesters finally advancing along the ridge up to Miraumont. A counter-attack from Miraumont at 04.15 the following morning was shattered by the Manchesters, as were two more against the division that day. On 24 August the Manchesters worked round Miraumont, 7th Bn securing fords over the River Ancre, and large numbers of prisoners were taken. On 25 August, patrols of 7th Manchesters advanced against Warlencourt, and as opposition diminished a company passed through the town at 10.00 before halting to allow flanking units to catch up. The division continued to advance slowly against rearguards until the end of the month. On 2 September 127 Bde put in an attack on Villers-au-Flos with a company of 7th Bn attached to 5th Manchesters. With support from tanks, aircraft, mortars and a creeping barrage, the Manchesters fought their way through the village and were consolidating before noon. They were now in an exposed salient, but were relieved by the rest of 7th Bn that night. The following morning the battalion sent forward patrols, who found that the enemy had retired. The division then exploited this success, and a period of open warfare ensued, with cavalry going into action.

After a period of rest, the division returned to the line for the set-piece assault on the Hindenburg Line (the Battle of the Canal du Nord). 127 Brigade advanced at 08.20 on 27 September with 5th Manchesters leading over the Trescault Ridge to the first objective, after which 6th and 7th Bns passed through to the second and third objectives. 7th Battalion was exposed to enfilade fire from high ground that a flanking formation had failed to capture, and lost two-thirds of the 450 men who attacked. It dealt with two determined counter-attacks, but B Company threw out a defensive flank and held the ground. By 14.30 a weak company was on the fourth objective, but the battalion was now too weak to attempt the final objective, which was taken later that night by the rest of the division, which continued to advance the following morning.

42nd Division next participated in the Battle of the Selle. The divisional Royal Engineers bridged the River Selle on the nights of 17–19 October and the attack went in at 02.00 on 20 October. 127 Brigade set off at 07.00 and passed through towards the second objective with 7th Bn in support. Although the leading battalions were badly knocked about, they captured the village of Marou and consolidated. 7th Battalion now came up, and D Company deployed to form a defensive flank. Even though the company was reduced to 35 men, it repelled counter-attacks for eight hours. When the advance was resumed on 23 October 127 Bde was in support. During the subsequent pursuit (3–11 November), it remained in support, marching through the Forest of Mormal and across the River Sambre behind 42nd Division's advanced guards until the Armistice with Germany came into effect on 11 November.

42nd Division remained at Hautmont on the Sambre during November, then moved to Charleroi where demobilisation began. As the men went home the division's units were reduced to cadres by 16 March 1919, and 7th Bn was disembodied on 10 April.

==== Commanding officers ====
The following officers served as CO of the 1/7th Manchesters during the war:

- Lt-Col H.E. Gresham, TD
- Maj J. Staveacre
- Maj P.H. Creagh, DSO
- Lt-Col A Canning, CMG
- Lt-Col A.E. Cronshaw, DSO, TD
- Brevet Lt-Col H.A. Carr, DSO
- Bt Lt-Col W.T. Bromfield
- Bt Lt-Col E.W. Manger

=== 2/7th Battalion ===
The 2/7th Bn was formed at Burlington Street in August 1914. and shortly afterwards was included in the 2/1st Manchester Brigade of 2nd East Lancashire Division. There was a great shortage of arms and equipment, and the 2nd Line East Lancashire units had to train with .256-in Japanese Ariska rifles until the end of 1915. Training was also interrupted by the need to supply reinforcement drafts to the 1st Line overseas. It was not until August 1915 that the division (now numbered as the 66th (2nd East Lancashire), with the 2/1st Manchester Bde as 199 (Manchester)) was able to concentrate in Kent and Sussex. By the end of the month all Home Service men had left to join Provisional Battalions (see below). Early in 1916 the division was transferred to coastal defence duties in East Anglia, but training was still hindered by the requirement to supply drafts to the 42nd Division. It was not until 1 January 1917 that the division was declared ready for overseas service.

66th Division began embarking for France at the end of February, and was concentrated at Berguette and Thiennes by 16 March. It served in the desultory operations along the Flanders coast in the summer, then moved to the Ypres salient in October to join the Third Ypres Offensive.

==== Poelcapelle ====
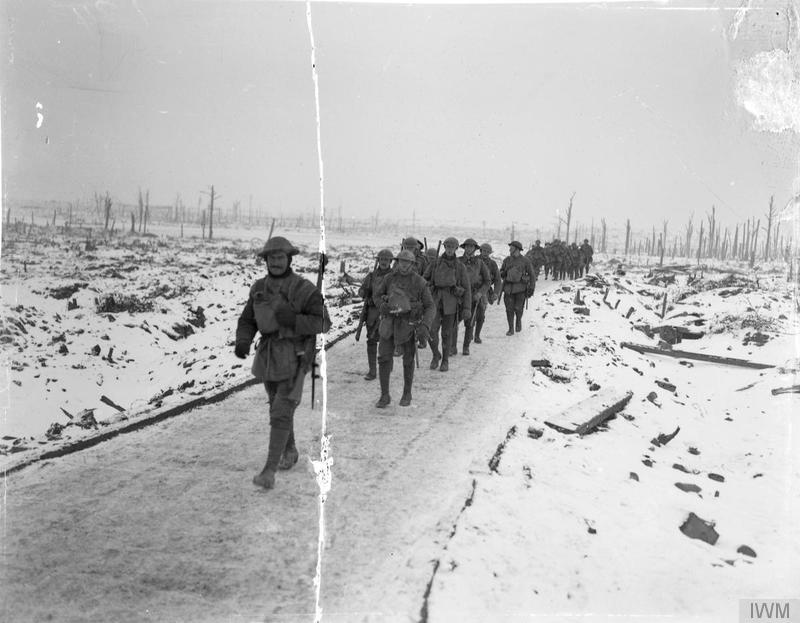
Men of 2/7th Battalion, Manchester Regiment, coming out of the line on the Menin Road, 27 December 1918.

The division's first attack was on 9 October at the Battle of Poelcappelle. Its role was to advance up a ridge to the outskirts of the village of Passchendaele. Ground conditions were bad, but it was believed that there was no German wire to negotiate. The division began its 2.5 miles (4.0 km) approach march at 19.00 the evening before, and was expected to be resting at its jumping-off line by midnight. But the mud was so bad that the troops arrived 20 minutes after the attack was launched, and simply fixed bayonets and kept walking. As well as the mud, which seriously hindered movement, clogged weapons and deadened artillery fire, they were faced by unanticipated barbed wire and the artillery had made no impression on German pillboxes. Although patrols from 66th Division did reach Passchendaele, by the end of the day all temporary gains had been wiped out, and the division did note even hold a consolidated line.

==== Operation Michael ====
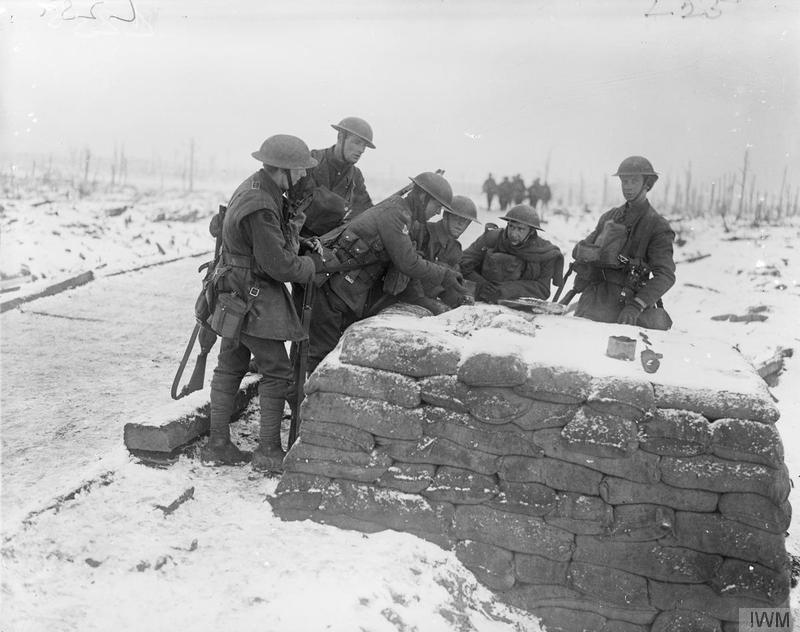
Men of 2/7th Battalion, Manchester Regiment, on the Menin Road, 27 December 1918.

When the German Spring Offensive opened, 66th Division had recently been moved from Ypres to Fifth Army and was holding a line among the undulating valleys of the River Somme's tributaries. Reconnaissance had revealed strange new holes in No man's land, which turned out to be forming-up points for the German Stormtroopers. The divisional front was held by three battalions in the Forward Zone and three out of the other six in the Battle Zone. 2/7th Manchesters was among the battalions held back from the Battle Zone, but the divisional commander had forbidden them to move into position until the battle actually started. Aided by early morning fog, the German attack on 21 March quickly broke through the Forward Zone, isolating the battalions, and continued into the Battle Zone.

The 2/7th Manchesters had to make a five-hour cross-country march under shellfire and wearing Gas masks to reach their assigned positions. HQ Company and one rifle company were established just north of Brosse Woods. About 13.00 they were spotted by a German aircraft and the bombardment was renewed, followed by an attack. Communication with brigade and divisional HQs was cut off, and the companies ran out of Hand grenades and serviceable Lewis guns shortly after 17.00. Cut off, the two companies surrendered having suffered over 70 per cent casualties. The other companies are believed to have been similarly overwhelmed in the fog.

66th Division had suffered some of the heaviest casualties during the battle, and in April its battered battalions were reduced to training cadres. 2/7th Manchesters was disbanded on 31 July, the remaining personnel being transferred to the 1/7th Bn in 42nd Division.

=== 3/7th Battalion ===
This battalion was formed at Burlington Street in March 1915, with the role of training drafts for the 1/7th and 2/7th Bns. Early in 1916 it moved to Witley. On 8 April that year it was renamed the 7th Reserve Bn, Manchester Regiment, and on 1 September it was absorbed into the 5th Reserve Bn.

=== 28th Battalion ===
The Home Service men of the 7th Manchesters, together with those of other TF battalions of the Manchesters and Lancashire Fusiliers, were combined into 45th Provisional Battalion, which became 28th Manchesters on 1 January 1917. It served in 73rd Division and was disbanded in 1918.

== Amalgamation ==
See main article 6/7th Battalion, Manchester Regiment

Officially, 42nd (East Lancashire) Division began reforming at home in April 1920 but 7th Manchesters had already reformed at Burlington Street on 7 February. However, when the TF was reconstituted as the Territorial Army (TA) in 1921, the 7th Manchesters was amalgamated with the 6th Battalion as the 6th/7th Battalion, Manchester Regiment on 31 December 1921. The combined battalion remained in 127 (Manchester) Brigade of 42nd Division until 1936 when it was converted into a heavy anti-aircraft regiment of the Royal Artillery, in which role it served during the Second World War.

On 31 July 1939, as part of the doubling in size of the TA before the outbreak of the Second World War, new 6th and 7th Battalions of the Manchester Regiment were created as duplicates of the 5th and 8th (Ardwick) Battalions respectively; these served as infantry during the war.

== Honorary Colonels ==
The following officers served as Honorary Colonel of the unit:

- Hon Algernon Egerton (1825–91), former CO, appointed on 17 July 1871.
- Francis Egerton, 3rd Earl of Ellesmere (1847–1914), former CO
- Gen Sir Reginald Wingate, Bt (1861–1953), appointed on 16 December 1914; after the merger of the battalions he served as joint Hon Colonel of the 6th/7th Bn and later of the 65th HAA Regiment.

== Battle Honours ==
The battalion was awarded South Africa 1900–1902 for the service of its volunteers during the 2nd Boer War. During the First World War, the battalion contributed to the honours of the Manchester Regiment.

== Memorials ==
A stone pillar was erected in Whitworth Park as a memorial to the men of 7th Manchesters who died in the First World War.

A memorial stone was laid by Harold Greenwood, formerly of the 7th Manchesters, on behalf of former comrades, when the Nightingale Centre at Great Hucklow, Derbyshire, was built in 1930–31 as a convalescent home for ex-soldiers.

== Online sources ==
- Lancashire Record Office, Handlist 72
- Imperial war Museum War Memorials Register
- The Long, Long Trail
- Museum of the Manchester Regiment
