= 5th Battalion, Manchester Regiment =

4th Lancashire RVC 1st Volunteer Bn, Manchester Regiment 5th Bn, Manchester Regiment 111th (Manchester) Regiment, RAC 652 (5th Bn Manchester Regiment) HAA Regiment, RA
- Active: 21 January 1860 – 30 June 1955
- Country: United Kingdom
- Branch: Volunteer Force/Territorial Force
- Role: Infantry; Armour; Air defence
- Size: 1–3 Infantry battalions Armoured regiment Air defence regiment
- Part of: 127th (Manchester) Brigade
- Garrison/HQ: Wigan
- Engagements: First World War: Third Battle of Krithia; Battle of Krithia Vineyard; Battle of Romani; Battle of Poelcapelle; Defence of Bucquoy; Battle of Albert; Battle of the Canal du Nord; Battle of the Selle; Second World War: Battle of France

Commanders
- Notable commanders: Nathaniel Eckersley; Sir Henry Darlington, KCB, CMG, TD

The 21st (Wigan) Lancashire Rifle Volunteers, later the 5th Battalion, Manchester Regiment, was a unit of Britain's Volunteer Force and Territorial Army recruited in and around Wigan. It served as infantry in Egypt, at Gallipoli, and in some of the bitterest battles on the Western Front in the First World War. Its Second Line battalion was virtually destroyed in the German spring offensive of 1918. During the Second World War, the battalion served in the Battle of France and was evacuated from Dunkirk. Afterwards it was converted into an armoured regiment, but saw no action in this role. Postwar it served as an anti-aircraft unit of the Royal Artillery until 1955.

== Volunteer Force ==
The enthusiasm for the Volunteer movement following an invasion scare in 1859 saw the creation of many Rifle Volunteer Corps (RVCs) composed of part-time soldiers eager to supplement the Regular British Army in time of need. One such unit was the 21st Lancashire RVC raised by mill-owner Nathaniel Eckersley at Wigan on 20 January 1860. The corps had a strength of two companies, with the riflemen drawn mainly from artisans employed by the local collieries and engineering works, officered by local professional men. A permanent headquarters was built at Wigan, the £6000 cost being raised by the formation of a limited liability company with £1 shares bought by the members through small instalments. A number of smaller RVCs were also raised in the surrounding area (now part of Greater Manchester), and from 29 October 1860 these were grouped into the 4th Administrative Battalion, Lancashire Rifle Volunteers, based at Eccles:

- 46th (Swinton) Lancashire RVC, formed as one company on 24 February 1860 and absorbed No 12 (Eccles) Company of the 6th (1st Manchester) Lancashire RVC when the 4th Admin Bn was formed
- 55th (Leigh) Lancashire RVC, formed as a sub-division on 3 March 1860, increased to a full company in June; joined the 4th Admin Bn in October 1861
- 60th (Atherton) Lancashire RVC, formed as one company on 6 March 1860; joined the 4th Admin Bn in October 1861
- 67th (Worsley) Lancashire RVC, formed as one company on 7 May 1860
- 76th (Farnworth) Lancashire RVC, formed as one company on 3 July 1860
- 91st (Flixton) Lancashire RVC, formed as one company on 14 August 1872

The headquarters (HQ) of the 4th Admin Bn moved to Manchester in 1862, to Wigan by the beginning of 1877, and back to Manchester in 1879. From 16 March 1865 the battalion was commanded by Lieutenant-Colonel Robert Mather, a former captain in the 14th Hussars. He was succeeded by Major John H. Chambers of the 6th Royal Lancashire Militia. The battalion's Honorary Chaplain from its formation was the Rev St. Vincent Beechey, Vicar of Worsley.

After a period attached to the 8th (Bury) Lancashire RVC, the 21st (Wigan) Lancashire RVC also joined the 4th Admin Bn in 1869, and Eckersley became one of the battalion's majors the following year. The 21st expanded to five companies during the 1870s. When the Volunteers were consolidated into larger units in 1880, the 4th Admin Bn became the 21st Lancashire RVC on 6 March, taking the number of its senior subunit, but renumbered as the 4th Lancashire RVC on 3 September the same year, with the following organisation:

- A to E Companies at Wigan – ex 21st RVC
- F Company at Swinton – ex No 1 Company, 46th RVC
- G Company at Eccles – ex No 2 Company, 46th RVC
- H Company at Leigh – ex 55th RVC
- J Company at Atherton – ex 60th RVC
- K Company at Worsley – ex 67th RVC
- L and M Companies at Farnworth – ex 76th RVC
- N Company at Flixton – ex 91st RVC

By now Lt-Col Chambers had become the battalion's honorary colonel, and with so many companies the unit was entitled to two lieutenant-colonels, of whom James Lindsay, 26th Earl of Crawford, a former Ensign in the Grenadier Guards and MP for Wigan, was the senior, and his brother-in-law Arthur Bootle-Wilbraham (grandson of the 1st Lord Skelmersdale and father of the 5th Lord), a former Ensign in the Coldstream Guards, was the junior. Throughout this period of time, the battalion, like many other Volunteer Battalions had a shortage of Officers.L & M Companies, located at Farnworth are a typical example. In the 1880s they were led by Captain E.S. Hargreaves and Captain Cuthbert James Taylor. However, both men resigned, the former on 14 September 1889 and the latter on 15 March 1890. To remedy the immediate shortfall, Officers from the Wigan Detachment took over the running of L & M company. Captain John Laidler Hedley, ex 'E' Company, was placed in temporary command of L & M. This was not ideal, Laidler's strengths lay in his organisational abilities and he was utilised in assisting the Quarter Master in his duties at the annual camp. This effectively left L & M leaderless during this time. In 1891, Laidler returned to the Wigan detachment and newly promoted Captain Walter Tomlinson, ex 'B' Company, replaced him. By 1884 the social composition of the Wigan corps had changed, with 43 per cent of the rank and file now employed in building trades, only 25 per cent in engineering and metalwork, and a further 12 per cent were clerical workers.

Under the 'Localisation of the Forces' introduced by the Cardwell Reforms, the 4th was linked with other Manchester-based RVCs, Militia regiments and the Regular 63rd and 96th Foot into Sub-district No 16 (Lancashire). When the 63rd and 96th were amalgamated to create the Manchester Regiment as part of the Childers Reforms, the 4th Lancashire RVC was formally attached to it as a volunteer battalion (VB) on 1 July 1881, and was redesignated as its 1st Volunteer Battalion on 1 September 1888.

While the sub-districts were referred to as 'brigades', they were purely administrative organisations and the Volunteers were excluded from the 'mobilisation' part of the Cardwell system. The Stanhope Memorandum of December 1888 proposed a more comprehensive Mobilisation Scheme for Volunteer units, which would assemble in their own brigades at key points in case of war. In peacetime these brigades provided a structure for collective training. Under this scheme the five (later six) VBs of the Manchester Regiment constituted the Manchester Brigade. By now the 1st VB's HQ was established at 42 Lancaster Avenue, Fennel Street, Manchester, still with the Earl of Crawford as Lt-Col Commandant and Lt-Col Bootle-Wilbraham as second-in-command.

Volunteers from the battalion served for a year in a Service Company alongside the Regulars of the regiment during the Second Boer War, followed by two further drafts in succeeding years. This service gained the battalion its first Battle Honour South Africa 1900–1902. By now it was based at the Drill Hall, Patricroft, Manchester.

== Territorial Force ==
When the Volunteer Force was subsumed into the new Territorial Force (TF) under the Haldane Reforms of 1908, the 1st VB became the 5th Battalion, Manchester Regiment, with its HQ at Bank Chambers, Wigan. The Manchester Brigade became part of the East Lancashire Division of the TF.

== First World War ==
=== Mobilisation ===
On the outbreak of war, the division was at its annual camp when the order to mobilise was received at 05.30 on 4 August. The units returned to their drill halls to mobilise, the men being billeted close by. The 5th Battalion mobilised at Bank Chambers under the command of Lt-Col W.S. France.

On 10 August, TF units were invited to volunteer for Overseas Service. The infantry brigades of the East Lancashire Division volunteered by 12 August and on 15 August 1914, the War Office issued instructions to separate those men who had opted for Home Service only, and form these into reserve units. On 31 August, the formation of a reserve or 2nd Line unit was authorised for each 1st Line unit where 60 per cent or more of the men had volunteered for Overseas Service. The titles of these 2nd Line units would be the same as the original, but distinguished by a '2/' prefix and would absorb the flood of volunteers coming forwards. In this way duplicate battalions, brigades and divisions were created, mirroring those TF formations being sent overseas.

=== 1/5th Battalion ===
On 20 August the East Lancashire Division moved into camps, with the Manchester Bde near Rochdale, and on 5 September it received orders to go to Egypt to complete its training and relieve Regular units from the garrison for service on the Western Front. It embarked on a convoy of troopships from Southampton on 10 September, and landed at Alexandria on 25 September, the first complete TF division to go overseas. Major Henry Darlington, who had seen active service in the Boer War, was promoted to Lt-Col to command 1/5th Manchesters and take it overseas.

On arrival the 1/5th Bn went into garrison at Mustapha Barracks in Alexandria and underwent intensive training. At first the division's role was simply garrison service, but on 5 November Britain declared war on Turkey and Egypt became a war zone. While the East Lancashire Division went to guard the Suez Canal, the Manchester Bde was detached in January 1915 to garrison Cairo.

==== Gallipoli ====
At the end of April the division was ordered to sail to join the Gallipoli campaign. On 3 May 1/5th and 1/6th Manchesters embarked at Alexandria on the SS Derfflinger, a captured German Norddeutscher Lloyd shipping line vessel that had just arrived with a cargo of wounded from the initial landings at Gallipoli. Derfflinger missed her intended landing spot at Cape Helles, and so the Manchesters arrived late on 6 May, after the rest of the division had gone into action. The 1/5th Bn bivouacked above 'W' Beach ('Lancashire Landing') and during the night of 7/8 May was moved, with ammunition, rations and entrenching equipment, but no blankets or baggage, to the Krithia sector, where the men went into the firing line for a 10-day period. On 12 May the brigade made a feint attack to attract attention away from a movement elsewhere.

On 25 May, the East Lancashire Division was formally designated 42nd (East Lancashire) Division, and the Manchester Brigade became 127th (Manchester) Brigade.

During another spell in front of Krithia beginning on 25 May, the 1/5th and 1/6th Manchesters advanced their line between 50 and 200 yards (180 m). The lines were now within assaulting distance of the nearest Turkish trenches, and a new attack (the Third Battle of Krithia) was launched on 4 June. After a bombardment starting at 08.00, the assault was launched at noon. 127th Brigade led 42nd (EL) Division's attack, with half of 1/5th Bn in the first wave, and in this sector all went well to begin with: despite intense rifle and machine gun fire the brigade took all its first objectives, the second wave passing through and parties advancing up to 1,000 yards (910 m) into the Turkish fourth line. The Official History records that 'The Manchester Territorials, fighting like veterans, were all in high fettle'. There was almost nothing between them and Krithia, and beyond that the ultimate target of Achi Baba. However, things had gone disastrously wrong for 127th Bde's neighbours, and the Turks were counter-attacking both flanks. Although the Manchesters held on to the first Turkish line they had captured, casualties had been severe. The Manchesters consolidated their position on 5 June before being relieved that night and going into reserve.

On 12 June the Manchester Brigade was withdrawn from the Gallipoli Peninsula and went to the island of Imbros for rest. It returned to Cape Helles on 21 June and 1/5th Bn went up to the forward sector on 23 June. They relieved the 1/6th Bn in the firing line in the Krithia Nullah sector on 29 June. The battalion then spent the next six weeks alternating in the line with 1/6th and 1/7th Bns, taking casualties steadily.

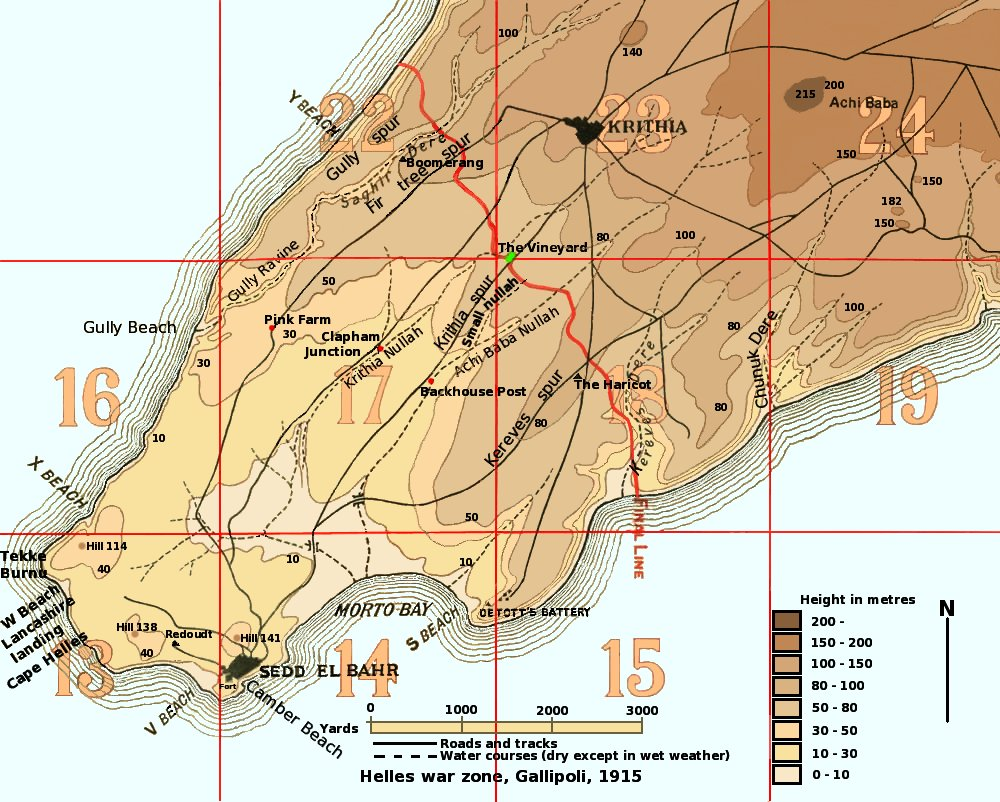
The Battle of Krithia Vineyard.

A new attack at Helles (the Battle of Krithia Vineyard) began on 6 August. 88th Brigade of 29th Division wa to launch the attack, but to protect its right flank 1/5th Manchesters was tasked with an attack on two small trenches (H11a and H11b) on the right bank of West Krithia Nullah. The battalion moved into the front line overnight, but then had to wait in the sun during the artillery exchanges until the assault was launched at 15.50. 1/5th Manchesters reached their first objective with hardly a casualty, but this turned out to be a dummy trench. Meanwhile 88th Bde had been shattered within a few minutes, and a Turkish counter-attack drove the Manchesters out of the trench they had captured. The battalion was ordered to make a new attempt to take H11b after dark and get in touch with 4th Bn Worcestershire Regiment of 88th Bde, who were believed to be hanging on in trench H13. The battalion's second attack also failed, and a reconnaissance by 1/7th Bn revealed that H13 was fully held by the Turks, and that the remnants of the Worcesters were slipping back across No man's land. 29th Division's proposed attack that night was therefore cancelled. 42nd (EL) Division launched its own attack at 09.45 next morning, from H11b to F13, but this also failed. 127th Brigade was now temporarily unfit for service and its total strength was only that of a single battalion, though it relieved 125th (Lancashire Fusiliers) Brigade on 8/9 August. The division was finally withdrawn into reserve on 13 August.

After a short rest and receiving a few drafts and returning casualties, the division was put back into the line on 19 August, still badly under strength and suffering from sickness. Lieutenant-Col Darlington was one of those who were evacuated sick, and the 1/5th and 1/6th Manchesters were temporarily combined under the commanding officer of 1/6th Bn. For the rest of the month the combined battalion alternated in the front line with 1/8th Manchesters.

Both sides resorted to mine warfare, and ex-coal miners in 42nd (EL) Division were active in this. The Turks regularly exploded mines in front of the British trench known as the 'Gridiron'. On 29/30 October one such explosion blew in 15 yards (14 m) of trench, killing two men and burying six, of whom three were quickly dug out, but the other three, all miners, were given up for dead. Three days later, led by Private Grimes, 1/5th Manchesters, the three missing men emerged from their mine shaft, having dug through 12 feet (3.7 m) with a pocket knife. Between 6 May and 4 November 1/5th Manchesters lost 10 officers and 144 other ranks (ORs) killed, 23 officers and 463 ORs wounded, and 6 officers and 57 ORs missing. Nevertheless, the division continued to hold its position, suffering further casualties from mining and bad weather until its infantry were evacuated to Mudros on 29 December.

==== Romani ====
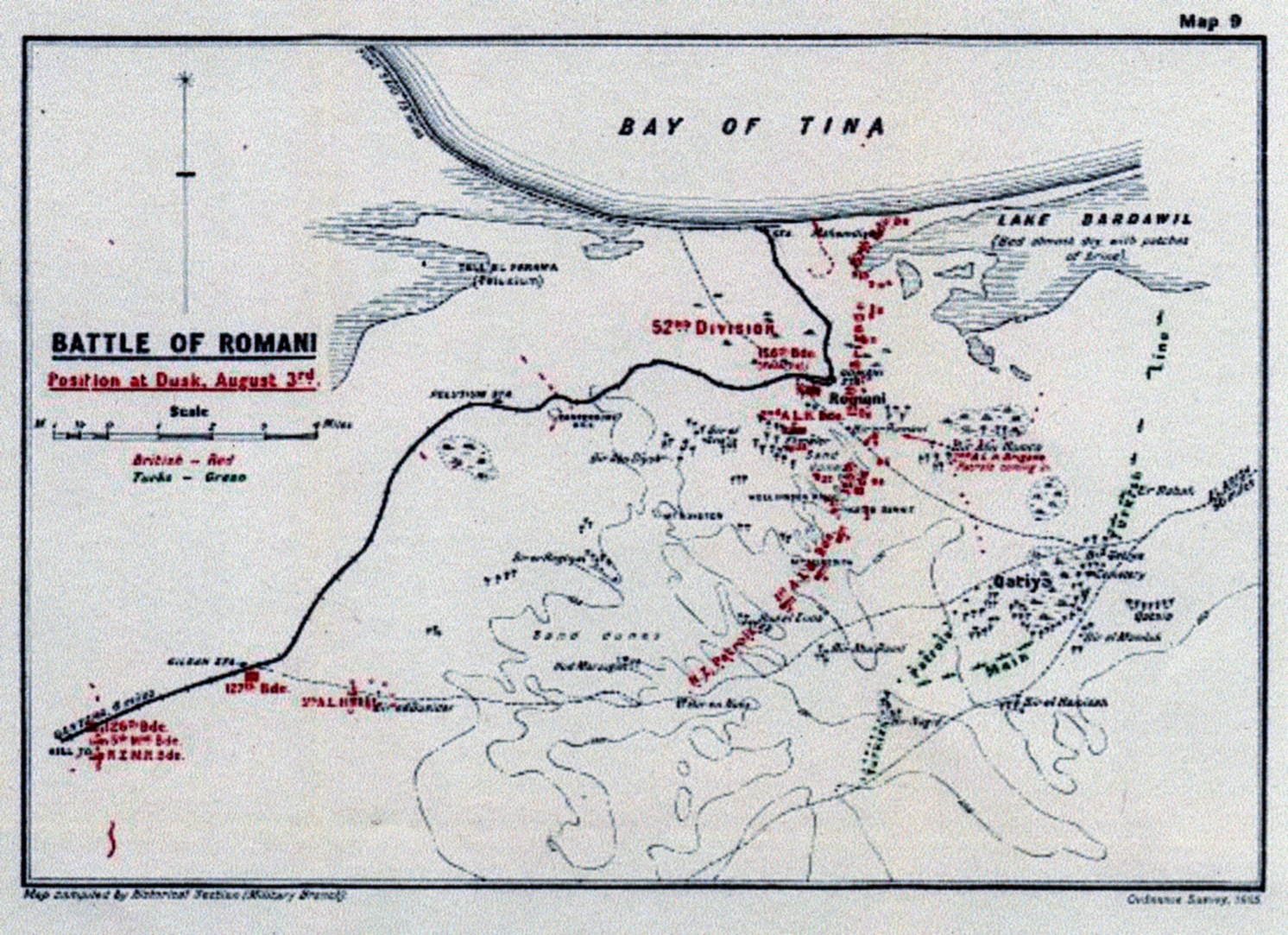
The Battle of Romani 3–4 August 1916.

The Gallipoli Campaign was shut down at the beginning of January, but 42nd (EL) Division remained on Mudros for some time before returning to the Egyptian Expeditionary Force (EEF) and the Suez Canal defences. From February to 1916 it was stationed at Shallufa, base for the Southern Sector of the defences, broken by spells of training in the desert. In June the division was moved to the Central Sector, between Ismailia and Kantara. 1/5th and 1/8th Manchesters were stationed with 126th (East Lancashire) Bde between El Ferdan and Abu Uruk. In July, 42nd (EL) Division became part of a Mobile Column (under Maj-Gen Hon Herbert Lawrence, former brigadier of 127th Bde) formed to counter a threatened Turkish thrust across the Sinai desert before it reached the canal. 127th Brigade was the advanced brigade of this force, and 1/5th Manchesters moved up from El Ferdan to rejoin. The Battle of Romani opened early on the morning of 4 August, and 127th Bde was rushed up to support the Anzac Mounted Division, which was heavily engaged. 1/5th and 1/7th Manchesters led off, through heavy sand in intense heat, and extended into line when 2,000 yards (1,800 m) from the Turks, 1/5th Bn on the right, to attack Mount Royston. However, seeing fresh troops arriving and the Anzacs remounting their horses, the Turks fled or surrendered. The brigade had moved so fast that it left its transport behind, but that night the camel transport carried vital water and supplies up to the front line troops. During 5 and 6 August the brigade pursued the defeated Turkish force, suffering badly from extreme heat and lack of water, with many men falling out through exhaustion, until it reached Qatiya.

For the next few months the division was part of the Desert Column covering the extension of the railway and water pipeline into the Sinai Desert to permit the Egyptian Expeditionary Force to mount an offensive into Palestine. The head of the Desert Column reached El Arish, near the Palestine frontier, on 22 December. On 28 January 1917, orders arrived for the division to be sent to the Western Front. By 12 February the division had withdrawn from El Arish to Moascar, and on 22 February the division began embarking at Alexandria for Marseille.

==== Western Front ====
By 2 March 1/5th Manchesters had landed at Marseille. The troops were concentrated at Pont-Remy, near Abbeville, and re-equipped; the Short Magazine Lee-Enfield rifle was issued in place of the obsolescent long model with which the battalions had gone to war. The division was employed on working parties in the area abandoned by the Germans when they retired to the Hindenburg Line, and then the brigades started taking turns in the line near Havrincourt Wood. On the night of 8/9 June all four battalions of the Manchesters went into No man's land to dig a new trench 300 yards (270 m) closer to the enemy line, which was completed and occupied the following night. The battalions also carried out regular night patrols and raids.

From 9 July to 22 August the division was in reserve, with 127th Bde stationed at Achiet-le-Petit. It then moved to the Ypres Salient where the Third Ypres Offensive was continuing, passing through the Menin Gate to Frezenberg on 7 September. The battalion was now regularly shelled and bombed, suffering a trickle of casualties. It was not involved in the division's failed attack on Borry Farm but practised for a renewed attack that was cancelled on 12 September. After a short spell in the Salient, the division was relieved and moved to the Nieuport sector on the Belgian coast, where it relieved 66th (2nd East Lancashire) Division on 23 September (1/5th Manchesters relieved 2/5th Manchesters, see below). It went into the line on 26/27 September and remained here until November. In the front line it engaged in active patrolling; when not in the front line trenches it had to supply working parties to build underground passages. It then marched to the Givenchy sector, arriving on 27 November, and spent the winter building concrete defences to replace the existing poor breastworks. The BEF was now suffering a manpower crisis, and in early 1918 around a quarter of its battalions were disbanded to reinforce others; the 1/5th Manchesters absorbed a draft of 6 officers and 174 ORs from the disbanded 1/9th Manchesters on 16 February. Lieutenant-Col Darlington left the battalion on medical grounds on 18 February and Maj T. Blatherwick was promoted to take over. On 1 March the battalion was at virtually full strength, with 43 officers and 975 ORs.

==== Spring Offensive ====
When the German spring offensive opened on 21 March 1918, 42nd (EL) Division was in reserve behind the Portuguese Expeditionary Corps, but on 23 March it was sent south in motor buses to reinforce Third Army. 127th Brigade debussed at midnight on the Ayette–Douchy road and set up an outpost line. The following day the division was ordered to relieve 40th Division, and 127th Bde advanced in artillery formation across open ground to take up its positions. At dawn on 25 March the Germans attacked, making some penetrations but being stopped by the Manchesters. That night the 1/5th Manchesters took up positions at Logeast Wood. During 26 March the enemy began working round the division's flanks, and it was ordered to pull back to the Bucquoy–Ablainzevelle line; 127th Brigade slipped away unnoticed and the German advance was held in front of Bucquoy, despite heavy shellfire. Over the next two days the Germans continued to attack from Ablainzeville, and 1/5th Manchesters sent up platoons and companies to support the rest of the brigade as required. On 29 March the battalion was relieved and moved to Gommecourt Park, where it was heavily shelled and began digging in. Casualties had been heavy, the battalions of 42nd (EL) division now averaging only 350 remaining effectives. However, the first stage of the German offensive had been checked, although shellfire and raiding continued along the line (particularly during the Battle of the Ancre on 5 April) until the division was relieved on 8 April.

The battalion went back to Louvencourt where received large drafts of reinforcements: 13 officers and 127 ORs)from battalions that had been disbanded in February, including 18th (3rd City) Bn, Manchesters, the former 'Pals battalion'; 113 ORs from 17th Entrenching Battalion (also formed from 18th and 19th (4th City) Manchesters amongst others); 25 ORs transferred from each of the other battalions in 127th Bde (1/6th and 17th Manchesters); and 48 ORs straight from England. On 17 May the battalion received a draft of 80 ORs from 2/5th Manchesters, which was being reduced to a cadre (see below). On 26 May Lt-Col Blatherwick was transferred to command 1/6th Manchesters, and Maj W.F. Panton was promoted to succeed him.

The battalion had gone back into the line on 16/17 April, by which time the Third Army front was relatively quiet, the Germans having switched their offensive to the north. The policy was now to advance the line by means of small raids and aggressive patrolling (so-called 'peaceful penetration'). A small party of 1/5th Manchesters raided a German post in 'Watling Street', west of Auchonvillers on the morning of 9 July, wiping out the occupants and then attacking a working party; the whole raiding party received decorations. On the night of 20/21 July 127th Bde advanced its line by 500 yards, establishing a new outpost at 'Fort Stewart', which it consolidated over the following nights. On 30/31 July a patrol of the battalion came under fire and the officer was killed; Corporal J. Melling took command, withdrew the patrol successfully and carried back the body of the officer. In July the division was struck by the flu epidemic, but did receive some drafts: on 31 July the 1/5th Manchesters absorbed the remaining cadre of the 2/5th Manchesters from 66th (EL) Division (see below), and thereafter was officially the 5th Bn, though it continued to refer to itself as the 1/5th. Lieutenant-Col Darlington returned to the battalion on 4 August, but was sent to hospital four days later, when Lt-Col Panton resumed command.

==== Hundred Days Offensive ====
The Allied counter-offensive began with the Battle of Amiens (8–12 August), as a result of which the Germans began to give ground. Patrols from 5th Manchesters found posts like 'Watling Street' unoccupied on 14 August and 42nd (EL) Division began following up against rearguards next day. Third Army began its formal assault (the Battle of Albert) on 21 August. 125 Brigade advance behind a creeping barrage onto its first objective, then the barrage switched to precede 127th Bde advancing with two battalions, each with a company of 5th Manchesters in support. Assisted by morning mist, the Manchesters took their first objective and then moved on, finally advancing along the ridge up to Miraumont. 5th Manchesters moved up behind to the 'Redan'. A counter-attack from Miraumont at 04.15 the following morning was shattered by the Manchesters, as were two more against the division that day, but the German gas shelling drove 5th Manchesters' HQ out of the Redan into Munich Trench. 5th Manchesters continued supporting 127th Bde as it crossed the River Ancre and captured Miraumont on 24 August. The division continued to advance slowly against rearguards until the end of the month. Thilloy near Bapaume held up a neighbouring division for two days during the Second Battle of Bapaume, but on 29 August patrols of 5th Manchesters found it being evacuated, and pushed on through the village. On 2 September 127th Bde put in a setpiece attack on Villers-au-Flos with support from tanks, aircraft, mortars and a creeping barrage that began moving forward at 05.18. 5th Manchesters on the right made good progress and the village was entered at 05.50 and cleared by 06.00, though the right-hand company was held up by pockets of enemy until the field guns and aircraft accompanying the advance were turned onto them. The division then exploited this success, and a period of open warfare ensued, with cavalry passing through 127th Bde and going into action as the Germans withdrew to the Hindenburg Line once more.

After a period of rest and training, the division returned to the line for the set-piece assault on the Hindenburg Line (the Battle of the Canal du Nord). Zero hour was 05.30 on 27 September; the bombardment on 42nd (EL) Division's opened at 08.20 and A Company of 5th Manchesters left their trenches three minutes later, leading 127th Bde's advance over the Trescault Ridge 'in fine stye'. They were in the opposing trenches by 08.26. B Company was briefly held up by machine gun fire but 'dashed in' and captured the Black Line objective, after which 6th and 7th Bns passed through to the second and third objectives. The situation on the right flank was confused, so C and D Companies of 5th Manchesters were sent to form a defensive flank. 6th and 7th Battalions were too weak to attempt the final objective, Welsh Ridge, but it was taken that night by the rest of the division, which continued to advance the following morning.

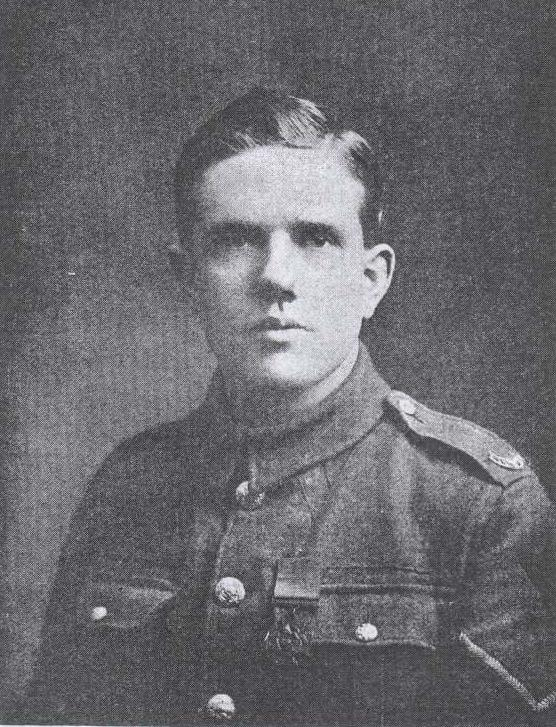
Lance-Corporal Alfred Wilkinson, VC.

After 10 days' rest and training 42nd (EL) Division next participated in the Battle of the Selle. The divisional Royal Engineers bridged the River Selle on the nights of 17–19 October and the attack went in at 02.00 on 20 October. 127th Brigade set off at 07.00 and passed through the leading brigades to follow the creeping barrage towards the second objective at Marou. There was a lot of confusion: much of the barrage fell short onto the battalion as it advanced, and it was enfiladed by machine guns, Lt-Col Panton being wounded. Four runners were killed trying to get a message back to the supporting company: Private Alfred Wilkinson volunteered for the duty. He was subsequently awarded the Victoria Cross, the citation stating that 'He succeeded in delivering the message although the journey involved exposure to extremely heavy machine-gun and shell fire for 600 yards (550 m). He showed magnificent courage and complete indifference to danger and throughout the remainder of the day continued to do splendid work'.

By the end of the day 42nd (EL) Division had secured all its objectives. Major W.M. Tickler took command of the battalion. When the advance was resumed on 23 October 127th Bde was in support. During the subsequent pursuit (3–11 November), it remained in support, marching through the Forest of Mormal and across the River Sambre behind 42nd (EL) Division's advanced guards until the Armistice with Germany came into effect on 11 November.

42nd (EL) Division remained at Hautmont on the Sambre during November, then moved to Fleurus where demobilisation began. As the men went home the division's units were reduced to cadres by 16 March 1919. On 27 February Lt-Col Darlington returned to the battalion to take command of the cadre and take it home. It moved to Charleroi in March, then sailed to Immingham on 28 March. 5th Manchesters was disembodied on 6 April.

On 31 October 1918 the battalion calculated that its total casualties since 4 May 1915 had been 399 killed, 1308 wounded and 137 missing. The later divisional history lists 34 officers and 468 ORs killed, died of wounds or sickness, or missing.

=== 2/5th Battalion ===
The 2nd Line battalion was formed at Wigan on 31 August 1914, and by November it was training at Southport in 2nd Manchester Brigade of 2nd East Lancashire Division. It remained in Lancashire until about May 1915, when moved to the Crowborough area in Sussex where the division was concentrating. Training was hindered by the lack of instructors and weapons: the infantry battalions eventually received .256-in Japanese Ariska rifles. Unit training was also delayed because of the need to provide reinforcements drafts to the 1st Line serving at Gallipoli. At the end of August the remaining Home Service men were transferred to the provisional battalion (see below) and all the personnel of 2/5th Manchesters were eligible for overseas service. The division was numbered 66th (2nd East Lancashire) Division and the brigade became 199th (Manchester) Brigade.

At the end of 1915 the battalions were issued with Lee–Enfield rifles and in March 1916 the division moved to Colchester in Essex to become part of Southern Army (Home Forces) responsible for part of the East Coast defences. However, all the division's units were still providing large drafts for units serving overseas and it was not until January 1917 that it was considered ready for service. It received its embarkation orders on 11 February, and the transport of 2/5th Manchesters entrained at Colchester for Southampton Docks on 4 March. It sailed on the SS Karnak the same night, but the sea was too rough and it returned to port. The rest of the battalion successfully sailed from Folkestone to Le Havre on the SS Princess Henrietta on 6 March under the command of Lt-Col Alfred Hewlett (who had only joined 5th Manchesters as a 2nd Lieutenant after the outbreak of war and had been rapidly promoted). It was not until 12 March that the transport reboarded the Karnak and caught up with the battalion at Saint-Floris. By then parties of the battalion had already been taken up to the Givenchy sector in London buses to carry out 48-hour familiarisation spells in the trenches, suffering their first casualty.

On 19 March the battalion took over part of the Cambrin sector near Béthune, and began alternating with 1/6th Manchesters in the front line trenches. The trenches were in poor condition, but the sector was generally quiet. There were a few casualties from shellfire, and to working parties or patrols. 2/5th Manchesters carried out the battalion's first offensive operation when C and D Companies raided the trenches opposite on the evening of 8 June behind an artillery barrage and smoke screen, taking prisoners while accompanying Royal Engineers blew in tunnel entrances.

199th Brigade was pulled out of the line on 19 June for training and then on 28 June the battalion entrained for St-Pol, behind the lines on the Flanders coast. Fourth Army was concentrating here in the Nieuport sector for a thrust up the coast (Operation Hush) in conjunction with the planned Third Ypres Offensive. The battalion continued training, and supplied large working parties to dig gun pits for the corps heavy artillery. When 66th (EL) Division took over the westernmost section of the line in July, 199th Bde was posted to watch the coast against flanking attacks from the sea. From August it moved round to face the German trenches across the River Yser, with the men accommodated in tunnels and dugouts beneath Nieuport when they were in the line. The whole sector was regularly shelled and bombed, and the battalion suffered numerous casualties. The division remained at Nieuport until 23 September when it was relieved by 42nd (EL) Division (2/5th Manchesters was relieved by 1/5th Manchesters, see above).

==== Poelcapelle ====
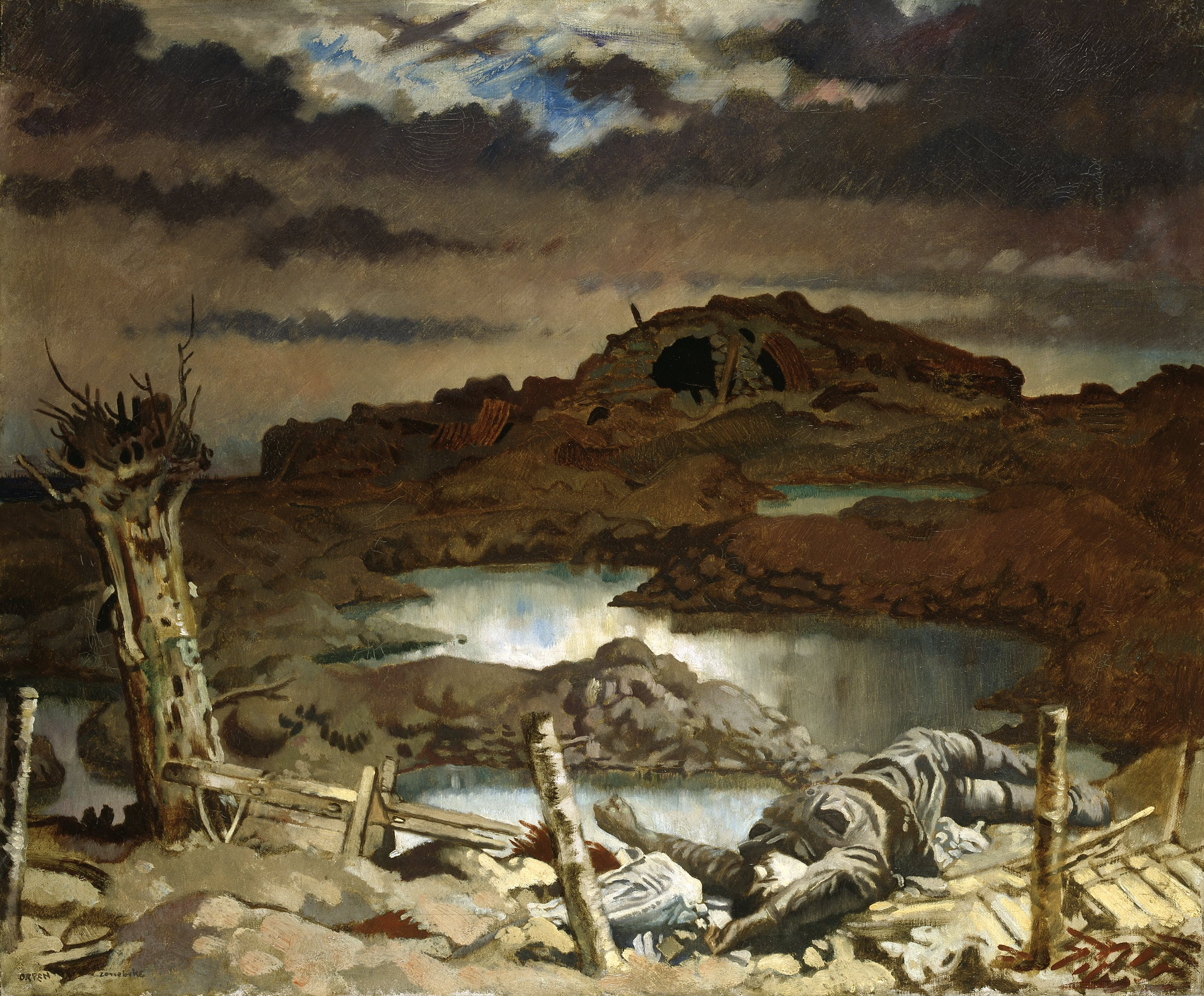
Zonnebeke by Sir William Orpen.

The division then travelled to the Ypres salient to join the Third Ypres Offensive. The battalion practised the new attack formations and then moved up to Zonnebeke, where 199th Bde took over the front line from the Australians, with 2/5th Manchesters in the support line. 66th (EL) Division made its first attack on 9 October at the Battle of Poelcappelle, where its role was to advance up a ridge to the outskirts of the village of Passchendaele. 197th and 198th Brigades attacked through the shellholes and mud, which seriously hindered movement, clogged weapons and deadened artillery fire. Although patrols from 66th Division did reach Passchendaele, by the end of the day all temporary gains had been wiped out, and the division did note even hold a consolidated line. During the night 2/5th Manchesters moved up to hold the old British front line, now the support line, which was under shellfire. The battalion was pulled out to camp near the Menin Gate on 11 September, having suffered 141 casualties even though it had not participated in the attack. 2/5th Manchesters received 140 reinforcements, but they were from a number of units, many untrained men from the Labour Corps. Lieutenant-Col Hewlett was sent to a rest camp (later evacuated to England) and the battalion moved to Arques where Maj K.G. Maxwell arrived from 2/6th Manchesters on 14 October to take over command. The battalion resumed training, moving back to Ypres in November, where it did some short spells in the line along the Ypres–Comines Canal and provided working parties. In January 1918 it returned to Zonnebeke to garrison and improve the line at Broodseinde and 'Daring Crossing' during the winter. 199th Brigade was relieved on 9/10 February and on 13 February 2/5th Manchesters received a draft from 2/8th Manchesters, which was being disbanded as part of the BEF's reorganisation.

==== Operation Michael ====
66th (EL) Division moved by rail to join Fifth Armythe Somme sector, where 2/5th Manchesters went into the line at Villeret, near Hargicourt on 27 February. The line ran through the undulating valleys of the Somme's tributaries. Reconnaissance had revealed strange new holes in No man's land, which turned out to be forming-up points for the German Stormtroopers. When the German spring offensive opened on 21 March the divisional front was held by three battalions in the Forward Zone (or Outpost Line), including 2/5th Manchesters. A heavy bombardment came down at 04.30, including a large amount of gas shells, and telephone lines back to brigade HQ were cut. The defences in the Hargicourt sector were close to the enemy's jumping-off trenches, and aided by early morning fog, the German attackers quickly penetrated the outposts at Villaret. Although the companies of 2/5th Manchesters in front reported 'all OK' at 10.00, Battalion HQ at 'the Egg' soon found itself attacked from the rear, and Lt-Col Maxwell and about 30 men broke out to join 2/6th Manchesters in the Red Line (the Battle Zone). The front line companies had effectively disappeared. 2/7th Manchesters marching up to occupy their positions in the Battle Zone met a few survivors of 2/5th Bn, who joined them, a story repeated all along the line as 66th (EL) Division fought to hold the enemy advance. The rear details of 2/5th Manchesters at the transport lines were sent forward under the second-in-command to reinforce 2/6th Manchesters.

2/6th Manchesters with the remnants of 2/5th Bn held on doggedly next day until 14.00 before falling back under cover of fog to the 'Green Line' at Hébécourt, where 50th (Northumbrian) Division was hurriedly digging in. On 23 March Lt-Col Maxwell and the remnant of 2/5th Manchesters helped 2/6th Bn to hold Bristol Bridge at Péronne, while British forces retreated over it. On 24 March the Germans carried out a heavy bombardment and at 18.00 the engineers destroyed the bridge, the last one standing over the Somme in this sector. Next day the German fire drove 66th (EL) Division back from the banks of the Somme, and Lt-Col Maxwell was posted as missing. From 26 March 199th Bde was so depleted that it operated as a single composite battalion. 66th (EL) Division was finally relieved on 31 March as Fifth Army's retreat ended in front of Amiens.

When the casualty list was drawn up on 13 April, 2/5th Manchesters reported losses since 21 March of 2 officers and 3 ORs killed, 8 officers and 22 ORs wounded, and 23 officers and 670 ORs posted as missing – killed or captured. (On 1 February 1918 the battalion had had a total strength of 43 officers and 775 ORs, and two weeks later received 10 officers and 184 ORs from 2/8th Manchesters). 66th Division had suffered some of the heaviest casualties during the battle, and in April its battered battalions were reduced to training cadres; one group of 80 ORs from 2/5th Manchesters was posted to 1/5th Bn with 42nd (EL) Division on 7 May (see above). On 1 June 2/5th Manchesters consisted of 14 officers and 77 ORs under the command of Lt-Col Hancock. The division was used to train newly arrived US troops: in June 2/5th Manchesters was attached to 106th Regiment of 27th US Division in a succession of training camps behind the lines.

2/5th Manchesters was disbanded on 31 July, the remaining personnel being transferred to the 1/5th Bn in 42nd (EL) Division (see above). The American troops they had trained went on to give distinguished service under British command during the Hundred Days Offensive.

=== 3/5th Battalion ===
This battalion was formed at Wigan on 25 May 1915, with the role of training drafts for the 1/5th and 2/5th Bns. Early in 1916 it moved to Witley Camp in Surrey. On 8 April that year it was renamed the 5th Reserve Bn, Manchester Regiment, and on 1 September it absorbed the 6th and 7th Reserve Bns in the East Lancashire Reserve Brigade at Witley. The battalion was back at Southport in October, then at Ripon in North Yorkshire in January 1917. It then moved to the Yorkshire coast, at Scarborough from July 1917, and at the end of the war was at Filey Camp, near Hunmanby.

=== 28th Battalion ===
After the 3rd Line TF battalions were formed in May 1915 the remaining Home Service and unfit men were separated to form brigades of Coast Defence Battalions (termed Provisional Battalions from June 1915). The men from the 5th Manchesters, together with those of several other TF battalions of the Manchesters (6th, 7th and 10th) and Lancashire Fusiliers (6th, 7th and 8th), were combined into 45th Provisional Battalion in 9th Provisional Brigade at Margate in Kent.

The Military Service Act 1916 swept away the Home/Foreign service distinction, and all TF soldiers became liable for overseas service, if medically fit. The Provisional Brigades thus became anomalous, and on 1 January 1917 the remaining battalions became numbered battalions of their parent units: 45th Provisional Bn became 28th Bn Manchester Regiment. It served in 219th Brigade of 73rd Division and was disbanded on 29 March 1918 at Southend-on-Sea.

== Interwar ==
When the TF was reconstituted on 7 February 1920 (becoming the Terrotorial Ary (TA) in 1921) the 5th Bn Manchester Regiment reformed at the Drill Hall, Wigan, under the command of Lt-Col A.W.W. Simpson. It was still in 127th Bde (which was commanded by the battalion's former CO, Col Henry Darlington, in 1920–24) in 42nd (EL) Division.

After the Munich Crisis the TA was doubled in size and most units formed duplicates. The 5th Manchesters formed a new 6th Battalion as its duplicate at Leigh on 5 August 1939. (The number had become vacant when the original 6th/7th Bn became 65th (The Manchester Regiment) Heavy Anti-Aircraft Regiment, Royal Artillery, on 10 December 1936).

== Second World War ==
=== 5th Manchesters ===
On the outbreak of the Second World War, the TA was mobilised on 1 September. 5th Manchesters mobilised in 127 Bde and trained first in Central Park, Wigan, then at Haydon Bridge, Northumberland, in October, moving to Marlborough, Wiltshire, in January 1940.

==== Battle of France ====
42nd (EL) Division joined the British Expeditionary Force (BEF) in France, 127 Bde arriving on 24 April. When the German offensive began on 10 May, the BEF advanced into Belgium under Plan D, and by 15 May its leading divisions were in place on the River Dyle. 42nd (EL) Division was to move up to prepare positions further back on the River Escaut in France. But the Wehrmacht's breakthrough in the Ardennes threatened the BEF's flank, and it had to withdraw again. On 17 May 127 Bde was assigned to a scratch force under Maj-Gen Noel Masone-Macfarlane ('Macforce') formed to protect this flank, denying the crossings of the River Scarpe. In the event this was not needed but by 21 May the whole BEF was back on the Escaut, with 42nd (EL) Division under attack at Tournai. On 23 May the BEF fell back to the 'Canal Line' to avoid encirclement, with 42nd (EL) Division still facing east on the Belgian frontier.

On 26 May the decision was made to evacuate the BEF through Dunkirk (Operation Dynamo). During the night of 27/28 May 42nd (EL) Division fell back to the River Lys, and the then to the River Yser. By the evening of 29 May the division was under heavy pressure from German tanks and infantry, but got away during the night. 127 Brigade was evacuated from Dunkirk on 30 May.

==== Home Defence ====
On return to the UK 42nd (EL) Division was sent to Northern Command to reorganise, with 5th Manchesters at Stokesley, near Middlesbrough, later at West Auckland. The division was assigned to X Corps, with 5th Manchesters stationed at Wortley in the Sheffield area. On 9 September the transferred to IV Corps, forming part of the GHQ Reserve west of London, with 5th Manchesters at Wheatley, Oxfordshire. In November 1940 42nd (EL) Division moved to join XI Corps in the East Coast defences, where it remained for the next year. 5th Manchesters was first based at Felixstowe, then at Southend-on-Sea from March 1941 and then in the summer at Orwell Park between Felixstowe and Ipswich.

=== 111th (Manchester) Regiment, Royal Armoured Corps ===
In October 1941 42nd (EL) Infantry Division returned to Northern Command and on 1 November was reorganised as 42nd Armoured Division, when its infantry battalions converted into tank regiments. 5th Battalion, Manchester Regiment became 111th Regiment, Royal Armoured Corps (Manchester Regiment).

=== 5th Manchesters (MG) ===
42nd Armoured Division was disbanded at the end of 1943, and several of its units reverted to their original designation and role, including 5th Battalion, Manchester Regiment, on 1 December 1943 when it was at Greatham, County Durham.

In 1937 the Regular battalions of the Manchesters had been reorganised as divisional machine gun (MG) battalions, equipped with Vickers machine guns and other heavy weapons. The reformed 5th Bn was organised as the MG battalion for 55th (West Lancashire) Division. The division was on a lower establishment, serving in home defence and acting as a feeder for formations overseas. Although it was restored to a higher establishment in May 1944, just before D Day, it was never deployed overseas. In August and September 1944 5th Manchesters guarded the royal family at Balmoral Castle. In December the battalion moved to Nutley, East Sussex, but D Company remained on royal protection duties at Sandringham House in Norfolk. In February 1945 the battalion concentrated at Mundford in Norfolk, then in April moved to Llanybydder in Carmarthenshire.

After the war ended, 5th Manchesters was sent to Malta on 15 November 1945, remaining there until the battalion was demobilised in November 1946. The remaining 157 men of the battalion transferred to 1st Battalion in British Army of the Rhine.

=== 6th Manchesters ===
On the outbreak of war 6th Battalion formed part of 199 Bde, which was administered by 42nd (EL) Division until the 66th Division was reformed on 27 September 1939. From April 1940 6th Manchesters trained in the Thirsk area of Yorkshire, moving to Driffield in June. In the reorganisation after Dunkirk 66th Division was disbanded and 199 Bde transferred to 55th (WL) Division. The division was serving in the East Coast defences under XI Corps, where 6th Manchesters joined it at Beccles in Suffolk on 23 June. In November the division moved to IV Corps with 6th Manchesters at Henley-on-Thames, from January 1941 at Huntercombe., then from July at Aldershot. In December 1941 55th (WL) Division moved to Northern Command, with 6th Manchesters stationed at Hull and then at Withernsea from May 1942.

On 5 May 1942 6th Manchesters was used to reform the Regular 1st Battalion of the regiment, which had been captured in Malaya. At first it remained in 199 Bde but later it was converted to the machine gun role. In February 1944 it became the MG battalion of 53rd (Welsh) Division and served with it in Normandy and the campaign in North West Europe.

== Postwar ==
When the TA was reconstituted on 1 January 1947, 5th Bn Manchester Regiment reformed at Wigan as 652 (Manchester) Heavy Anti-Aircraft Regiment, Royal Artillery. It formed part of 94 (AA) Army Group Royal Artillery, but when that was disbanded on 9 September 1948 the regiment was probably taken over by Anti-Aircraft Command. By about 1950/51 its title was changed to 652 (5th Bn The Manchester Regiment) HAA Rgt

After AA Command was abolished on 10 March 1955 the regiment was also disbanded by 30 June, though some of its personnel transferred to 253 (Bolton) Field Rgt, RA.

== Uniform and insignia ==
The unit's uniform was Rifle green with scarlet Facings until 1908 when it became 5th Manchesters and adopted that regiment's scarlet uniform with white facings. When the 5th Bn was converted into 111th RAC in 1941 it was permitted to retain its Manchester Regiment cap badge, worn on the RAC black beret.

== Honorary colonels ==
The following served as Honorary Colonel of the battalion:

- J.H. Chambers, former CO, appointed 17 March 1875
- James Lindsay, 26th Earl of Crawford, KT, VD, former CO, appointed 10 October 1900, died 31 January 1913
- N.F. Eckersley, appointed 22 November 1913
- David Lindsay, 27th Earl of Crawford, son of 26th Earl and former captain in 1st VB
- Sir Henry Darlington, KCB, CMG, TD, former CO, appointed 26 November 1927
