= 66th Infantry Division (United Kingdom) =

Infantry division in the British Army

- The shoulder insignia of the division, which was designed but never worn.
- Active: 27 September 1939 – 23 June 1940
- Branch: Territorial Army
- Type: Infantry
- Role: Infantry
- Size: War establishment strength: 13,863 men (Note: This is the war establishment, the on-paper strength. The war establishment of an infantry division was 13,863 men from the outbreak of the war until 1941.)

The 66th Infantry Division was an infantry division of the British Army, which was active between September 1939 and June 1940 during the Second World War. In March 1939, after the re-emergence of Germany as a European power and its occupation of Czechoslovakia, the British Army increased the number of divisions within the Territorial Army by duplicating existing units. The 66th Infantry Division was formed in September 1939, as a second-line duplicate of the 42nd (East Lancashire) Infantry Division. The division's battalions were all raised in the Lancashire and Cumbria area.

It was intended that the division would remain in the United Kingdom to complete training and preparation, before being deployed to France within twelve months of the war breaking out. Instead, the division spent the majority of its existence guarding vulnerable points in the United Kingdom. By May 1940, the division had been assigned to the initial plan to defend the country against any potential German invasion. As a result of the rapid German victory on mainland Europe in 1940, the division was not deployed overseas. Once the British Army returned from France, it implemented experience gained from the campaign. This involved the break-up of several divisions, including the 66th Division, in order to bring others up to full strength.

== Background ==
Throughout the 1930s, tensions built between Germany and the United Kingdom and its allies. During late 1937 and 1938, German demands for the annexation of Sudetenland in Czechoslovakia led to an international crisis. To avoid war, the British Prime Minister, Neville Chamberlain, met with the German Chancellor, Adolf Hitler, in September and came to the Munich Agreement, which accepted that the Germans would annexe the Sudetenland. Chamberlain had intended the agreement to lead to further peaceful resolutions to differences, but relations between both countries soon deteriorated. On 15 March 1939, Germany breached the terms of the agreement by invading and occupying the remainder of the Czech state.

On 29 March, the British Secretary of State for War, Leslie Hore-Belisha announced plans to increase the part-time Territorial Army (TA) from 130,000 men to 340,000 and double the number of divisions. (Note: The TA was a reserve of the British regular army made up of part-time volunteers. By 1939, its intended role was to be the sole method of expanding the size of the British armed forces (comparable to the creation of Kitchener's Army during the First World War). First line territorial formations would create a second line division using a cadre of trained personal and if needed, a third division would also be created. All TA recruits were required to take the general service obligation meaning that territorial soldiers could be sent overseas. (This avoided the complications experienced with the First World War Territorial Force, who initially could not be deployed unless they volunteered for overseas service.)) The plan was for existing TA divisions, referred to as the first-line, to recruit over their establishments, aided by an increase in pay for Territorials, the removal of restrictions on promotion which had hindered recruiting, the construction of better-quality barracks, and an increase in supper rations. The units would then form a new division, referred to as the second-line, from cadres. This process was dubbed "duplicating". The 66th Infantry Division was to be created as a second line formation, a duplicate of the first line 42nd (East Lancashire) Infantry Division. Despite the intention for the army to grow, the programme was complicated by a lack of central guidance on the expansion and duplication process and issues regarding the lack of facilities, equipment and instructors. It had been envisioned by the War Office that the duplicating process and recruiting the required numbers of men would take no more than six months. In April, limited conscription was introduced. At that time 34,500 men, all aged 20, were conscripted into the regular army, initially to be trained for six months before being deployed to second line units. The process varied widely between the TA divisions, and was complicated by a lack of central guidance, as well as the lack of facilities, equipment, and instructors. Some were ready in weeks while others had made little progress by the time the Second World War began.

== History ==
=== Formation and home defence ===
On 17 July 1939, the embryo of the division was formed. Major-General Arthur Purser, formally Brigadier, Royal Artillery, for Eastern Command, was assigned as General Officer Commanding (GOC). The same month, the 42nd Division created the 197th Infantry Brigade as a second line duplicate of the 125th Infantry Brigade, the 198th Infantry Brigade as a second line duplicate of the 126th Infantry Brigade, and the 199th Infantry Brigade as a second line duplicate of the 127th Infantry Brigade. However, the embryonic division and its brigades were administered by the 42nd Division until the 66th divisional headquarters was formed on 27 September 1939, located in Lancaster. At this point, the brigades were transferred to the 66th Division, which in turn was assigned to Western Command. The 197th Brigade comprised the 2/5th and the 2/6th Battalions, Lancashire Fusiliers, and the 5th Battalion, East Lancashire Regiment; the 198th Brigade comprised the 6th and the 7th Battalions, Border Regiment, as well as the 8th (Irish) Battalion, King's Regiment (Liverpool); the 198th Brigade comprised the 2/8th Battalion, Lancashire Fusiliers, and the 6th and the 7th Battalions, Manchester Regiment. Due to the lack of official guidance, the newly formed units were at liberty to choose numbers, styles, and titles. The division adopted the number of their First World War counterpart, the 66th (2nd East Lancashire) Division, and their divisional insignia. While the insignia was adopted, it was never actually worn by the men of the division.

The Government and military envisioned that the TA divisions each be deployed intact to reinforce the regular army formations in France as equipment became available, with all 26 TA divisions deployed by the end of the first year of the war. This was a lofty goal for the 66th Infantry Division. For example, at the start of the war, the 6th Battalion, Border Regiment had no small arms. The men of the battalion were billeted in their own homes, and attended their local drill hall for the start of their training. Training was further impeded by a large portion of the division's manpower being assigned to guarding strategically important locations, known as vulnerable points. These included railway bridges, Royal Ordnance Factories, and Royal Air Force bases. In November, the division was placed under the control of Northern Command. On 10 January, due to ill-health, Purser stepped down from his role as GOC. He was replaced on the same day by Major-General Alan Cunningham, who had previously commanded the 5th Anti-Aircraft Division.

In October 1939, Commander-in-Chief, Home Forces, General Walter Kirke, was tasked with drawing up a defensive plan to defend the United Kingdom from a German invasion, which was codenamed Julius Caesar. (Note: Julius was the codeword to bring troops to a state of readiness within eight hours. The codeword Caesar meant an invasion was imminent, and units were to be readied for immediate action. Kirke's plan assumed that the Germans would use 4,000 paratroopers, followed by 15,000 troops landed via civilian aircraft once airfields had been secured (Germany only actually had 6,000 such troops), and at least one division of 15,000 troops to be used in an amphibious assault.) The divisions assigned to this defensive plan were constantly changing, and, by May 1940, included the 66th Division. The division replaced the 49th (West Riding) Infantry Division in Northern Command's part of this plan, and as a result moved from positions around Manchester into Yorkshire. The division's role was to launch an immediate attack on German parachutists, or failing that, to cordon off and immobilise any German invasion effort, until relieved by forces capable of launching a counter-attack to defeat the Germans. On 9 April, following the German invasion of Norway, the second-line infantry divisions in the United Kingdom were requested to each form an independent infantry company consisting of 289 volunteers, who would be deployed to Norway. The 66th Division formed No. 10 Independent Company. However, the company was not deployed to Norway. Following the conclusion of the campaign, No. 10 Independent Company was based in Scotland and did not return to the division. (Note: Following a stint in Scotland, the company departed with elements of the Royal Marines Division to take part in Operation Menace, the abortive attack on the Vichy French port of Dakar. In October 1940, the company returned to the UK and was disbanded.) In May 1940, the divisional artillery was equipped with only seven First World War 4.5 in (110 mm) howitzers against a war establishment of seventy-two modern 25-pounder field guns. (Note: The howitzers did not belong to the division, having been borrowed from either the 23rd (Northumbrian) Division or the 46th Infantry Divisions.) Historian David John Newbold described all forces under Kirke's command in May, including the 66th, as having "been severely weakened by departures overseas", "spread very thinly" and "largely semi-trained, relatively immobile and lacking in all types of heavy equipment, especially artillery and anti-tank guns." In particular, the division relied heavily on civilian transport. It had, prior to moving to Yorkshire, conducted little training. The move, it was hoped, would rectify this situation. Shortly after transferring, the division began platoon and company size training exercises.

=== Disbandment ===
As a result of the Battle of France and the Dunkirk evacuation, the division did not leave Britain. As soon as the British troops returned from France, the British Army began implementing lessons learnt from the campaign. This involved the decision to abandon the two-brigade motor division concept (Note: British military doctrine development during the inter-war period resulted in the three kinds of division by the end of the 1930s: the infantry division, the mobile division (later called the armoured division), and the motor division. The historian David French wrote, "The main role of the infantry ... was to break into the enemy's defensive position". This would then be exploited by the mobile division, followed by the motor divisions that would "carry out the rapid consolidation of the ground captured by the Mobile divisions" therefore "transform[ing] the 'break-in' into a 'break-through". By 1940, five such divisions had been formed within the TA: 1st London, 2nd London, 50th (Northumbrian), 55th (West Lancashire), and the 59th (Staffordshire) Motor Division. French wrote that the motor division "matched that of the German army's motorized and light divisions. But there the similarities ended". German motorised divisions contained three regiments (comparable to British brigades) and were as fully equipped as a regular infantry division, while the smaller light divisions contained a tank battalion. Whereas the motor division, fully motorised and capable of transporting all their infantry, contained no tanks and was "otherwise much weaker than normal infantry divisions" or their German counterparts.) and for the basic infantry division to be based around three brigades. Four second-line TA infantry divisions were to broken-up to reinforce depleted formations and aid in transforming the Army's five motor divisions into infantry divisions. (Note: The 12th (Eastern) was disbanded on 11 July 1940, with its brigades dispersed to the following motor divisions as part of their transition to infantry formations: 1st London and 2nd London divisions. Its 37th Infantry Brigade became an independent brigade under II Corps. The two-brigade strong 23rd (Northumbrian) Division was disbanded on 23 June. One brigade transferred to the 50th (Northumberland) Infantry Division as part of their transition to infantry formations, while the other was eventually transferred to the 49th (West Riding) Infantry Division to bring it up to full strength. On 7 August, the 51st (Highland) Infantry Division was re-created by the re-designation of its second-line duplicate, the 9th (Highland) Infantry Division.) As a result, the 66th Infantry Division was chosen to be disbanded, which occurred on 23 June when its units were dispersed.

Specifically, the 197th Infantry Brigade (along with the 257 Field Company, Royal Engineers (RE), and the 110th Field Regiment, Royal Artillery (RA)) was transferred to the 59th (Staffordshire) Motor Division to finalise its re-organisation into an infantry division. These units, as part of the 59th (Staffordshire) Infantry Division, would go on to fight in the Battle of Normandy. The 198th Infantry Brigade became an independent formation that was initially attached to the 1st London Division, before being assigned to the 54th (East Anglian) Infantry Division at the end of 1940 and remained in the United Kingdom during the war. The 199th Infantry Brigade (along with the 109th Field Regiment, RA) was transferred to the 55th (West Lancashire) Motor Division to finalise its re-organisation into an infantry division. These units, as part of the 55th (West Lancashire) Infantry Division, were not deployed and remained in the United Kingdom through the end of the war. The 255th Field Company, RE, was disbanded, and the 256th Field Company, RE was eventually assigned to the 78th Infantry Division. The 111th Field Regiment, RA was transferred to the 66th Division's first line counterpart, the 42nd Division. Several days after the break-up of the division, Cunningham was assigned as GOC of the 9th (Highland) Infantry Division.

== Order of battle ==
66th Infantry Division (1939–1940)

197th Infantry Brigade

- 2/5th Battalion, Lancashire Fusiliers
- 2/6th Battalion, Lancashire Fusiliers
- 5th Battalion, East Lancashire Regiment

198th Infantry Brigade

- 8th (Irish) Battalion, King's Regiment (Liverpool)
- 6th Battalion, Border Regiment
- 7th Battalion, Border Regiment

199th Infantry Brigade

- 2/8th Battalion, Lancashire Fusiliers
- 6th Battalion, Manchester Regiment
- 7th Battalion, Manchester Regiment

Divisional troops

- 66th Divisional Artillery
  - 109th Field Regiment, Royal Artillery
  - 110th Field Regiment, Royal Artillery
  - 111th Field Regiment, Royal Artillery
- 66th Divisional Engineers
  - 255th Field Company, Royal Engineers
  - 256th Field Company, Royal Engineers
  - 257th Field Company, Royal Engineers (from 19 December 1939)
  - 258th Field Park Company, Royal Engineers
- 66th (Lancashire and Border) Divisional Signals, Royal Corps of Signals

== See also ==
- British Army order of battle (September 1939)
- British Army during the Second World War
- List of British divisions in World War II
