= Greenheys =

Greenheys may refer to:

- Greenheys, Manchester, an area of south Manchester, England
- Greenheys, Salford, an area of Little Hulton, Greater Manchester, England
