= 127th (Manchester) Brigade =

Infantry brigade of the British Army

Manchester Brigade 127th (Manchester) Brigade 127th Infantry Brigade
- Active: 1888–1919; 1920–1941
- Country: United Kingdom
- Branch: Territorial Army
- Type: Infantry
- Size: Brigade
- Part of: 42nd (East Lancashire) Infantry Division
- Engagements: Gallipoli Campaign; Battle of Romani; Battle of Passchendaele; Battles of the Somme (1918); Hundred Days Offensive (1918); Battle of France; Dunkirk evacuation

Commanders
- Notable commanders: Sir Herbert Lawrence; Sir John Smyth

British 42nd (East Lancashire) Division Insignia

The 127th (Manchester) Brigade was an infantry brigade of the British Army that saw active service during both the First and Second World Wars. It was assigned to the 42nd (East Lancashire) Division and served in the Middle East and on the Western Front in the First World War.

In the Second World War, as the 127th Infantry Brigade, it fought in France and was evacuated at Dunkirk. Once back in the United Kingdom, the brigade was converted into an armoured support group.

Throughout its existence the brigade was composed mainly of battalions of the Manchester Regiment.

== Early history ==
The Volunteer Force of part-time soldiers was created following an invasion scare in 1859, and its constituent Rifle Volunteer Corps (RVCs) were progressively aligned with the Regular British Army and Militia during the later 19th Century. Under the 'Localisation of the Forces' introduced by the Cardwell Reforms, existing RVCs were brigaded with Regular and Militia regiments in their district. Sub-District No 16 (Lancashire) formed in 1873 included the 63rd and 96th Regiments, the 6th Royal Lancashire Militia, the 4th and 7th Administrative Battalions of Lancashire RVCs and the 6th (1st Manchester), 33rd (Ardwick), 40th (3rd Manchester) and 56th (Salford) Lancashire RVCs, all from the Manchester, Salford and Ashton-under-Lyne area.

The 1881 Childers Reforms took Cardwell's scheme a stage further, the linked battalions converting into single two-battalion regiments. The 63rd and 96th were amalgamated to create the Manchester Regiment, and the Manchester and Ashton RVCs were formally attached to it as its 1st–5th Volunteer Battalions.

While the sub-districts were later referred to as 'brigades', they were purely administrative organisations and the Volunteers were excluded from the mobilisation part of the Cardwell system. But under the reforms introduced by Edward Stanhope in 1888, a comprehensive Mobilisation Scheme was brought in for Volunteer units, which would assemble in their own Volunteer Infantry Brigades at key points in case of war. In peacetime these brigades provided a structure for collective training. The five (later six) Volunteer Battalions of the Manchester Regiment constituted the Manchester Brigade, based at 55 Market Street, Manchester, and initially under the command of retired Colonel H.B.H. Blundell.

== Territorial Force ==
When the Volunteers were subsumed into the new Territorial Force (TF) under the Haldane Reforms of 1908, the Volunteer Battalions became the 5th–10th Battalions of the Manchester Regiment. The Manchester Brigade comprised the 5th–8th Battalions and formed part of the East Lancashire Division of the TF:

- 5th Battalion, Manchester Regiment (from Wigan)
- 6th Battalion, Manchester Regiment (from Hulme)
- 7th Battalion, Manchester Regiment (from Manchester)
- 8th Battalion, Manchester Regiment (from Ardwick)

== First World War ==
On the outbreak of the First World War, the majority of the men volunteered for overseas service. On 31 August 1914, the formation of Reserve or 2nd Line units was authorised for each TF unit going overseas. Initially these were formed from men who had not volunteered for overseas service, and the recruits who were flooding in. Later they were mobilised for overseas service in their own right. From now on, the original battalions and brigades were designated with a '1/' prefix and the 2nd Line duplicate by a '2/'. Eventually the 2nd Manchester Brigade went overseas as the 199th (Manchester) Brigade.

The East Lancashire Division embarked at Southampton and sailed for Egypt on 10 September 1914, the first complete TF division to leave England for foreign service. The division began disembarking at Alexandria on 25 September and the bulk (including the Manchester Brigade) concentrated at Cairo.

=== Order of battle ===
During the war, the Manchester Brigade was constituted as follows:

- 1/5th Battalion, Manchester Regiment
- 1/6th Battalion, Manchester Regiment
- 1/7th Battalion, Manchester Regiment
- 1/8th Battalion, Manchester Regiment (left for 126th Brigade February 1918)
- 127th Machine Gun Company, Machine Gun Corps (formed 14 March 1916, moved to 42nd Battalion, Machine Gun Corps 23 February 1918)
- 127th Trench Mortar Battery (joined 26 March 1917)

When British infantry brigades were reduced to three battalions in February 1918, 1/8th Manchesters transferred to 126th Brigade in 42nd Division. At the same time, the machine gun company left to join a new divisional machine gun battalion.

=== Commanders ===
The following officers commanded the East Lancashire Brigade during the war:

- Brigadier-General N. Lee (wounded 4 June 1915, died of wounds 22 June 1915)
- Lieutenant Colonel Lord Rochdale (acting)
- Brigadier-General Hon. Sir H.A. Lawrence (from 21 June 1915)
- Brigadier-General G.S.McD. Elliot (from 22 September 1915)
- Brigadier-General V.A. Ormsby (from 1 Mar 1916, killed 2 May 1917)
- Brigadier-General Hon. A.M. Henley (from 5 May 1917)

=== Egypt and Gallipoli ===
The East Lancashire Division remained in Egypt training and manning the Suez Canal defences until 1 May 1915 when it embarked at Alexandria for Gallipoli. The Manchester Brigade first went into action at the Third Battle of Krithia.

In late May 1915 the division was numbered as 42nd (East Lancashire) Division – taking the lowest number of any TF division in recognition that it was the first to go overseas – and the brigades were also numbered, the Manchester becoming 127th (1st Manchester) Brigade. The battalions adopted the prefix '1/' (becoming 1/5th Manchesters, for example) to distinguish them from their 2nd Line duplicates then training in the United Kingdom as the 199th (2/1st Manchester) Brigade in 66th (2nd East Lancashire) Division.

The 127th Brigade participated in the Battle of Krithia Vineyard (6–13 August) and then for the rest of 1915 was engaged in trench warfare. After the evacuation from Gallipoli, the division returned to Egypt in January 1916 with less than half the strength with which it had set out. It remained in the Canal Defences for the whole of 1916, rebuilding its strength, and taking part in the Battle of Romani (4–5 August).

=== Western Front ===
In January 1917, 42nd Division was ordered to France, the move being completed by mid-March. It spent the remainder of the war on the Western Front. During 1917 it formed part of Fourth Army in 'quiet sectors' (though the brigade commander was killed in May that year) and taking part in some minor operations along the Flanders coast.

In 1918 the 42nd Division became part of IV Corps in Third Army, in which it remained for the rest of the war. During the German Army's Spring Offensive (Operation Michael or the First Battles of the Somme 1918), the troops of 42nd Division took part in the Battle of Bapaume (24–25 March), First Battle of Arras (28 March) and the Battle of Ancre (5 April). Then, during the Allied Hundred Days Offensive, it participated in the Battle of Albert (21–23 August) and the Second Battle of Bapaume (31 August–3 September) during the fighting on the Somme.

When the Hindenburg Line was breached during the Battle of the Canal du Nord on 27 September 1918, 127th Brigade's attack was completely successful. The rest of 42nd Division then passed through to continue the attack. 125th Brigade's follow-up was only partially successful, but the advance was renewed after dark, and the following afternoon 126th Brigade passed through 127th to take Welsh ridge, the final objective.

Third Army's advance in Picardy culminated in the Battle of the Selle on 20 October.126th Brigade led the division's attack over footbridges laid by the engineers over the River Selle. 1/5th and 1/6th Manchesters of 127th Brigade then followed up to an intermediate objective. The division then had to wheel right, and was held up. But in the afternoon the attack was resumed and 127th Brigade pushed on to the final objective, which 1/6th Manchesters took after dark without much difficulty.

After the Selle, 42nd Division was withdrawn into reserve and halted around Beauvois-en-Cambrésis from 24 October until the advance was resumed on 3 November. On 7 November the 42nd Division captured Hautmont and the high ground to its west. By 10 November the most forward troops of 42nd Division were on the Maubeuge–Avesnes-sur-Helpe road. This was the end of the fighting, because the Armistice with Germany came into the effect the following day. In December the division moved into quarters in the Charleroi area and by mid-March 1919 most of its troops had gone home for demobilisation.

== Between the wars ==
The Territorial Force was disbanded after the war as was the brigade and the 42nd Division but both were reconstituted in the Territorial Army, which was formed on a similar basis as the Territorial Force. The brigade re-formed as the 127th (Manchester) Infantry Brigade with the same units as it had before the First World War, with all four battalions of the Manchester Regiment.

However, the 6th and 7th Manchesters were merged, in 1921, to create the 6th/7th Battalion, Manchester Regiment. To fill the gap left by the absence of the 7th Battalion, the 9th Battalion, Manchester Regiment was transferred from the 126th (East Lancashire) Infantry Brigade and this remained the structure of the brigade until 1936.

In the late 1930s the United Kingdom's air defences were greatly increased, mainly by converting a number of infantry battalions of the Territorial Army into anti-aircraft or searchlight units of the Royal Artillery or Royal Engineers. As a result, in 1936, the 6th/7th Battalion, Manchester Regiment was transferred to the Royal Artillery and became 65th (The Manchester Regiment) Anti-Aircraft Brigade, Royal Artillery, joining the 33rd (Western) Anti-Aircraft Group, 2nd Anti-Aircraft Division.

In 1938 a further reorganisation of the composition of Territorial divisions saw them reduced from four to three infantry battalions and so the 9th Battalion, Manchester Regiment left the brigade to become the machine gun battalion for the 42nd Division. They were replaced by the 4th/5th Battalion, East Lancashire Regiment from the 126th (East Lancashire) Infantry Brigade. Shortly afterwards, in 1939, the brigade was redesignated the 127th Infantry Brigade.

== Second World War ==
The brigade was mobilised, along with the rest of 42nd Division and the Territorial Army, in late August 1939 due to the worsening situation in Europe. On 1 September 1939 the German Army launched its invasion of Poland. The Second World War began on 3 September 1939, and 127th Infantry Brigade was embodied for full-time war service and all units were soon brought up to full strength.

=== Order of battle ===
The 127th Infantry Brigade was constituted as follows during the war:

- 4th Battalion, East Lancashire Regiment
- 5th Battalion, Manchester Regiment (transferred to 126th Brigade 8 September 1941)
- 8th (Ardwick) Battalion, Manchester Regiment (left 6 May 1940)
- 127th Infantry Brigade Anti-Tank Company (formed 2 February 1940, disbanded 24 January 1941)
- 1st Battalion, Highland Light Infantry (from 6 May 1940 until 31 October 1941)
- 2nd Battalion, Durham Light Infantry (8 September – 19 October 1941)
- 1st Battalion, East Lancashire Regiment (from 126th Brigade 25 to 31 October 1941)

=== Commanders ===
The following officers commanded 127th Infantry Brigade during the war:

- Brigadier V.T.R. Ford (until 16 November 1939)
- Lieutenant Colonel G.S. Kay (Acting, from 16 to 24 November 1939)
- Brigadier K.J. Martin (from 24 November 1939 until 25 January 1940)
- Lieutenant Colonel J.W. Pendlebury (Acting, from 25 January to 5 February 1940)
- Brigadier J.G. Smyth, VC (from 5 February 1940 until 2 April 1941)
- Brigadier R.C. Matthews (from 2 April until 25 October 1941)
- Lieutenant Colonel V.S. Laurie (Acting, from 25 to 28 October 1941)
- Brigadier C.C.G. Nicholson (from 28 October 1941)

=== France and Dunkirk ===
Commanded at the time by Brigadier Sir John George Smyth, VC, an Indian Army officer, the 127th Infantry Brigade landed in France on 24 April 1940 and became part of the British Expeditionary Force (BEF). The 42nd Division came under command of III Corps, which also included 5th Infantry Division and 44th (Home Counties) Division. The 44th had, along with the 42nd Division, initially been held back from joining the BEF sooner for potential operations in Northern Europe although, as it turned out, this plan never came to anything and both were sent to France at around the same time. Soon after arrival the 8th (Ardwick) Battalion, Manchester Regiment were sent on to Malta (one of many British Army garrisons around the Empire) and the brigade received the 1st Battalion, Highland Light Infantry, a Regular Army unit, in exchange. The battalion had arrived from Highland Area in Scottish Command and joined in order to strengthen the brigade, as part of the BEF's official policies, and took place in all the 1st Line Territorial divisions that joined the BEF (except the three 2nd Line divisions that arrived in April and were subsequently mauled in the fighting to come).

When the German attack on France and the Low Countries of Belgium and the Netherlands began on 10 May 1940, 127th Brigade was assigned to 'Macforce', a scratch force commanded by the Director of Military Intelligence with the BEF, Lieutenant-General Noel Mason-Macfarlane. Macforce assembled on 17 May with the role of covering the crossings over the River Scarpe As German pressure increased, the BEF was forced to withdraw to Dunkirk and 127th Brigade returned to 42nd Division on 20 May. It was evacuated from Dunkirk on 30 May.

=== Conversion ===
On 1 November 1941, 42nd Division was converted into 42nd Armoured Division, and 127th Brigade was renamed 42nd Support Group. Apart from 1st Battalion, East Lancashires, its infantry battalions were replaced by artillery regiments. On 1 June 1942 the support group was disbanded, its headquarters becoming the Royal Artillery HQ for the division.

== Recipients of the Victoria Cross ==
- Private Alfred Robert Wilkinson, 1/5th Battalion, Manchester Regiment, First World War

== External sources ==
- British Military History
- Lancashire Record Office, Handlist 72
- The Long, Long Trail
- Museum of the Manchester Regiment
- Land Forces of Britain, the Empire and Commonwealth (Regiments.org)
- The Regimental Warpath 1914–1918
