= Burlington Street drill hall =

Former British military installation

- Manchester
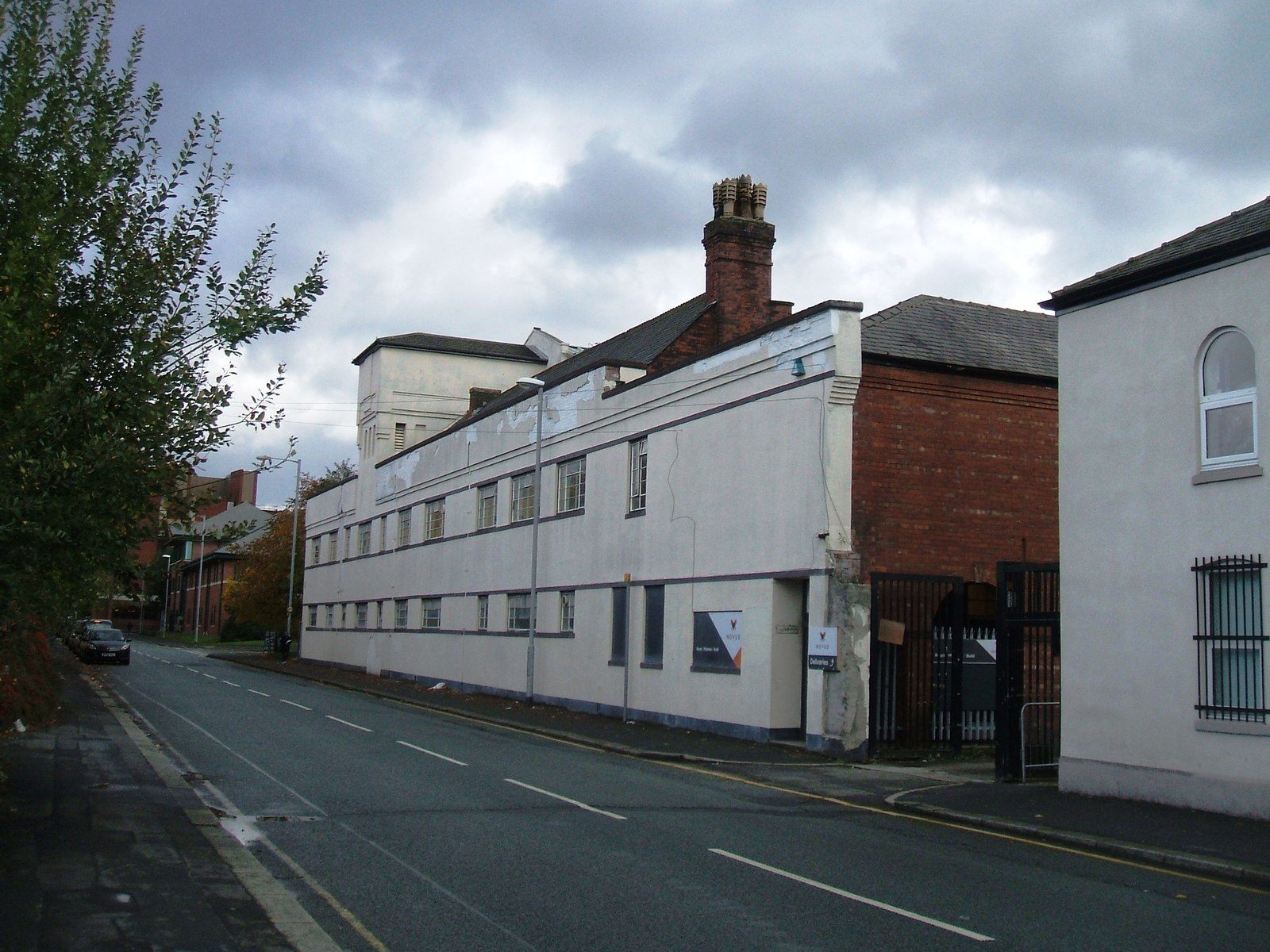
- Burlington Street drill hall

Site information
- Type: Drill hall

Location
- Location within Greater Manchester
- Coordinates: 53.46388°N 2.23817°W

Site history
- Built: 1885
- Built for: War Office
- In use: 1885–present

The Burlington Street drill hall is a former military installation in Greenheys, Manchester. It was used since the 1940s by the Victoria University of Manchester for physical education. More recently it was used as a Physical Education Centre and Islamic Prayer Hall by the university but is now disused.

== History ==
The building was designed as the headquarters of the 4th Volunteer Battalion, The Manchester Regiment and completed in 1885. This unit became the 7th Battalion, The Manchester Regiment (Territorial Force) in 1908. The battalion was mobilised at the drill hall in August 1914 before being deployed to Gallipoli and, ultimately, to the Western Front. The battalion amalgamated with the 6th Battalion to form the 6th/7th Battalion at the Stretford Road drill hall in Hulme in 1921.

In 1920–21 the Territorial Force was reorganised as the Territorial Army (TA). From 1922 to 1932 the drill hall was the headquarters of 42nd (East Lancashire) Divisional Signals, Royal Corps of Signals (TA), including a number of attached Supplementary Reserve signal units. It was subsequently used by the Manchester University Officer Training Corps.

The drill hall was substantially rebuilt in 1938 and then used as the headquarters of the 61st City of Manchester Battalion of the Home Guard during the Second World War. It was seriously damaged by a bomb during the Manchester Blitz in December 1940. It was subsequently decommissioned and acquired by the Victoria University of Manchester, who used it as a Physical Education Centre and Islamic Prayer Hall. It was used by the Senior Training Corps and had a swimming bath, gymnasium and fives and squash courts. The facility, which was known as the McDougall Centre, was named after the local benefactor, Sir Robert McDougall, of McDougall Brothers.

After the creation of the present University of Manchester in 2004 it ceased to be used.

== See also ==
- 3rd Manchester Rifles
