= Noel Lee (British Army officer) =

Brigadier-General Noel Lee VD
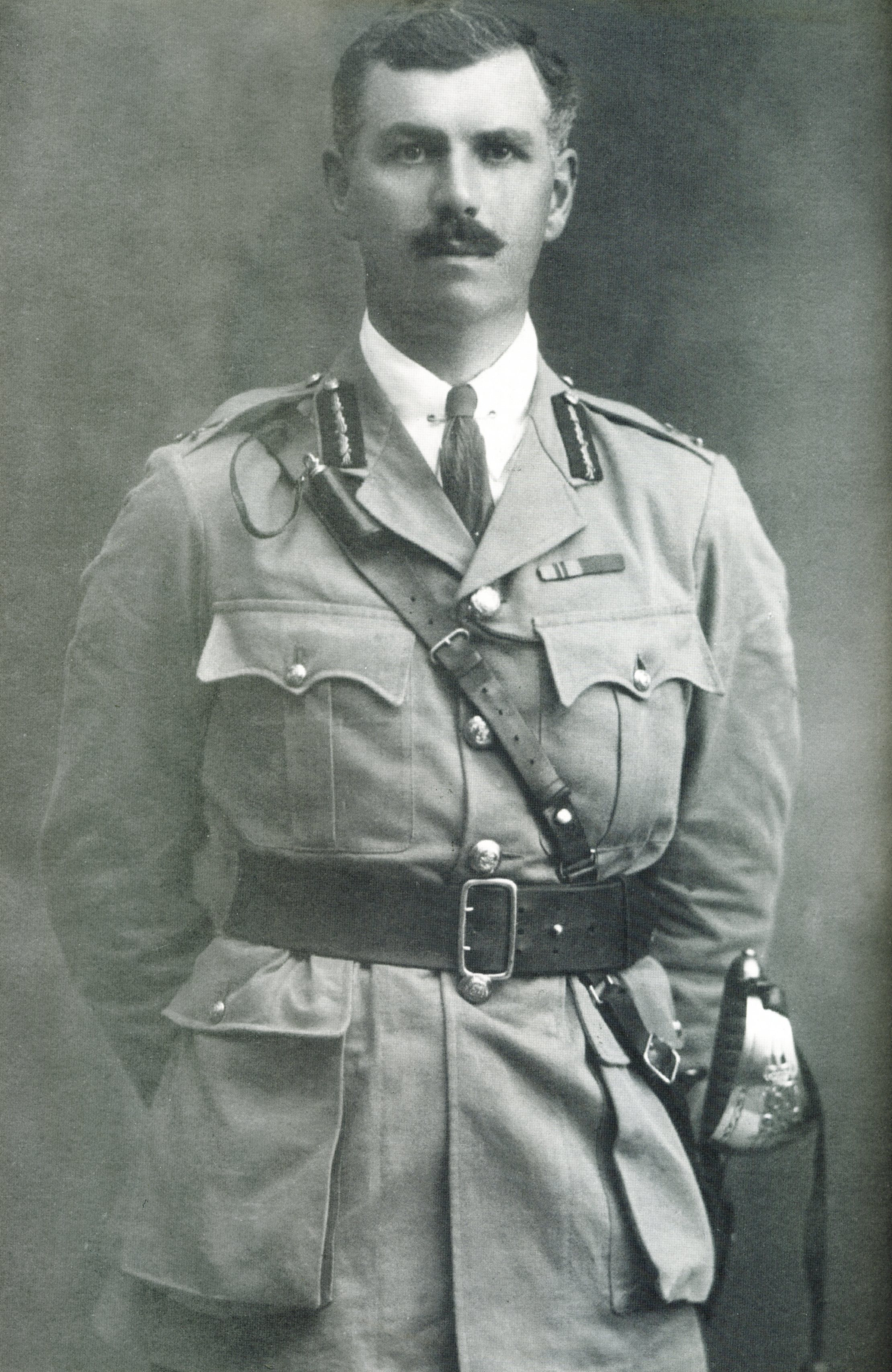
- Born: 23 December 1868
- Died: 22 June 1915 (aged 46)

Brigadier-General Noel Lee, VD (23 December 1868 – 22 June 1915) was a British businessman and British Army officer. He died of wounds received during the Gallipoli campaign while in command of the 127th (Manchester) Brigade.

He was the son of Sir Joseph Cocksey Lee.

He was promoted to colonel and placed in command of the Manchester Brigade of the Territorial Force on 1 September 1911.

He had been the first Territorial Force officer to be promoted to brigadier-general during the First World War, having been promoted to that rank in August 1914.

His eldest son, Captain Noel Esmond Lee, of the 8th Battalion, King's Royal Rifle Corps was killed on the Western Front on 24 August 1917.
