= Arthur Purser =

Major-General Arthur Purser OBE MC
- Born: 21 September 1884
- Died: 21 December 1953 (aged 69)
- Military career
- Allegiance: United Kingdom
- Branch: British Army
- Service years: 1903–1940
- Rank: Major-General
- Service number: 3885
- Unit: Royal Field Artillery
- Commands: 66th Infantry Division; 1st Heavy Brigade, Royal Artillery
- Conflicts: First World War; Second World War
- Awards: Officer of the Order of the British Empire; Military Cross

Major-General Arthur William Purser, OBE, MC (21 September 1884 – 21 December 1953) was a British Army officer.

== Military career ==
Educated at Marlborough College and the Royal Military Academy, Woolwich, Purser was commissioned into the Royal Field Artillery (RFA) on 15 July 1903. He saw service in France during the First World War, where he was awarded the Military Cross in 1917 while serving as an adjutant to a RFA brigade.

Remaining in the army during the interwar period and, after serving for several years at the Royal School of Artillery, Larkhill, Purser became commander of the 1st Heavy Brigade, Royal Artillery in 1931, an instructor at the Senior Officers' School, Sheerness in 1935 and Brigadier, Royal Artillery at Eastern Command in 1937. The following year saw him promoted to the rank of major-general.

In September 1939, the month the Second World War began, Purser went on to be General Officer Commanding (GOC) of the newly raised 66th Infantry Division, a Territorial Army formation. His command of the division was destined to be short-lived, however, as ill-health forced him into retirement from the army, after more than thirty-six years of service, in January 1940, with Alan Cunningham succeeding him in command of the 66th Division.

== Bibliography ==
- Smart, Nick (2005). Biographical Dictionary of British Generals of the Second World War. Barnesley: Pen & Sword. ISBN 1844150496.

Military offices
New command	GOC 66th Infantry Division; 1939–1940	Succeeded by Alan Cunningham
