= 199th (Manchester) Brigade =

2/1st Manchester Brigade 199th (2/1st Manchester) Brigade 199th Infantry Brigade
- Active: 1914-1919; 1939-1944
- Country: United Kingdom
- Branch: Territorial Army
- Type: Infantry
- Size: Brigade
- Part of: 66th (2nd East Lancashire) Division; 66th Infantry Division; 55th (West Lancashire) Infantry Division
- Engagements: First World War; Second World War

Commanders
- Notable commanders: Sir Guy Williams; Sir Gordon MacMillan

The 199th (2/1st Manchester) Brigade was an infantry brigade formation of the British Army that saw active service during the First World War as part of 66th (2nd East Lancashire) Division. During the Second World War, it was reformed as the 199th Infantry Brigade and served with the 55th (West Lancashire) Infantry Division until August 1944 when it was redesignated as the 166th Infantry Brigade.

== First World War ==
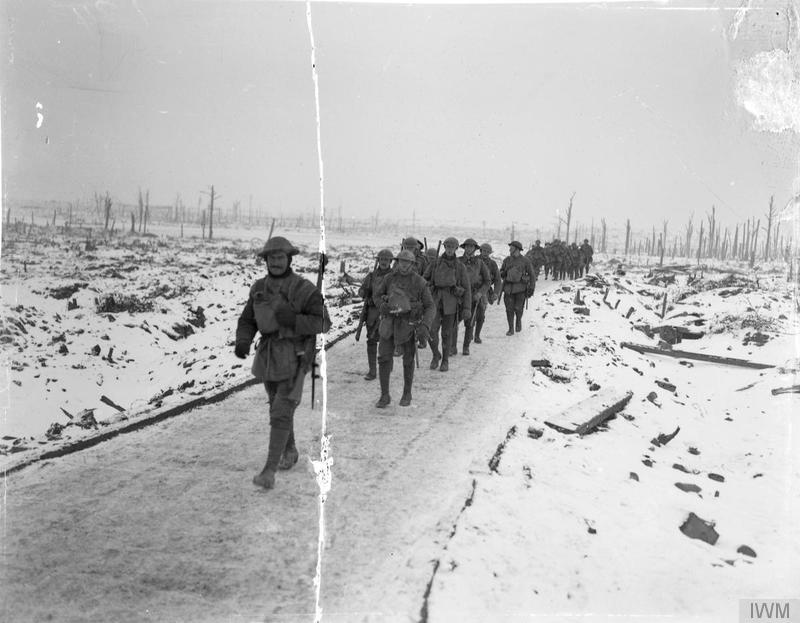
Men of the 2/7th Battalion, Manchester Regiment coming out of the trenches, Menin Road, 27 December 1917.

It was raised as a second line brigade, and was formed as a duplicate of the Manchester Brigade, originally with the title of 2/1st Manchester Brigade. The brigade, composed of four battalions of the Manchester Regiment, was part of the 2nd East Lancashire Division, and consisting of the men in the Territorial Force who, upon being asked to serve overseas after the outbreak of war, originally had not agreed to serve overseas. The brigades' original intention was to provide drafts of replacements for the first line units serving overseas.

However, due to conscription being introduced and the Military Service Act of 1916, the brigade, by now titled 199th (2/1st Manchester) Brigade, eventually ended up serving with the 66th Division as part of the British Expeditionary Force (BEF) on the Western Front. The brigade fought in the Battle of Passchendaele in late 1917. The brigade also saw service during Operation Michael in March 1918, part of the German Army's Spring Offensive, and, as with the rest of the division, suffered extremely heavy casualties. The brigade and division were later reformed and saw service during the final Hundred Days Offensive, which ended with the Armistice of 11 November 1918. The brigade was disbanded after the war along with the whole of the Territorial Force which was reformed in 1920 as the Territorial Army.

=== Order of battle ===
The 199th Brigade was constituted as follows:

- 2/5th Battalion, Manchester Regiment
- 2/6th Battalion, Manchester Regiment
- 2/7th Battalion, Manchester Regiment
- 2/8th Battalion, Manchester Regiment
- 6th Battalion, Lancashire Fusiliers
- 2/9th Battalion, Manchester Regiment
- 5th (Service) Battalion, Connaught Rangers
- 18th (Service) Battalion, King's (Liverpool Regiment)
- 204th Machine Gun Company, Machine Gun Corps
- 199th Trench Mortar Battery

== Second World War ==
The brigade was reformed in 1939, in preparation for war with Germany, as the 199th Infantry Brigade. It was initially assigned to the 66th Infantry Division until June 1940, when the division was disbanded. The brigade then joined the 55th (West Lancashire) Infantry Division to bring it up to a strength of three brigades. It served with the division until 1944, when it became an independent formation for several months while based in Northern Ireland. Redesignated as the 166th Infantry Brigade it rejoined the 55th for the final stages of the war, while remaining within the UK. The brigade never saw active service outside the United Kingdom.

=== Order of battle (incomplete) ===
- 2/8th Battalion, Lancashire Fusiliers
- 6th Battalion, Manchester Regiment
- 7th Battalion, Manchester Regiment
