= Greenheys, Manchester =

Area of Greater Manchester, England

Coordinates: 53°27′44″N 2°14′25″W

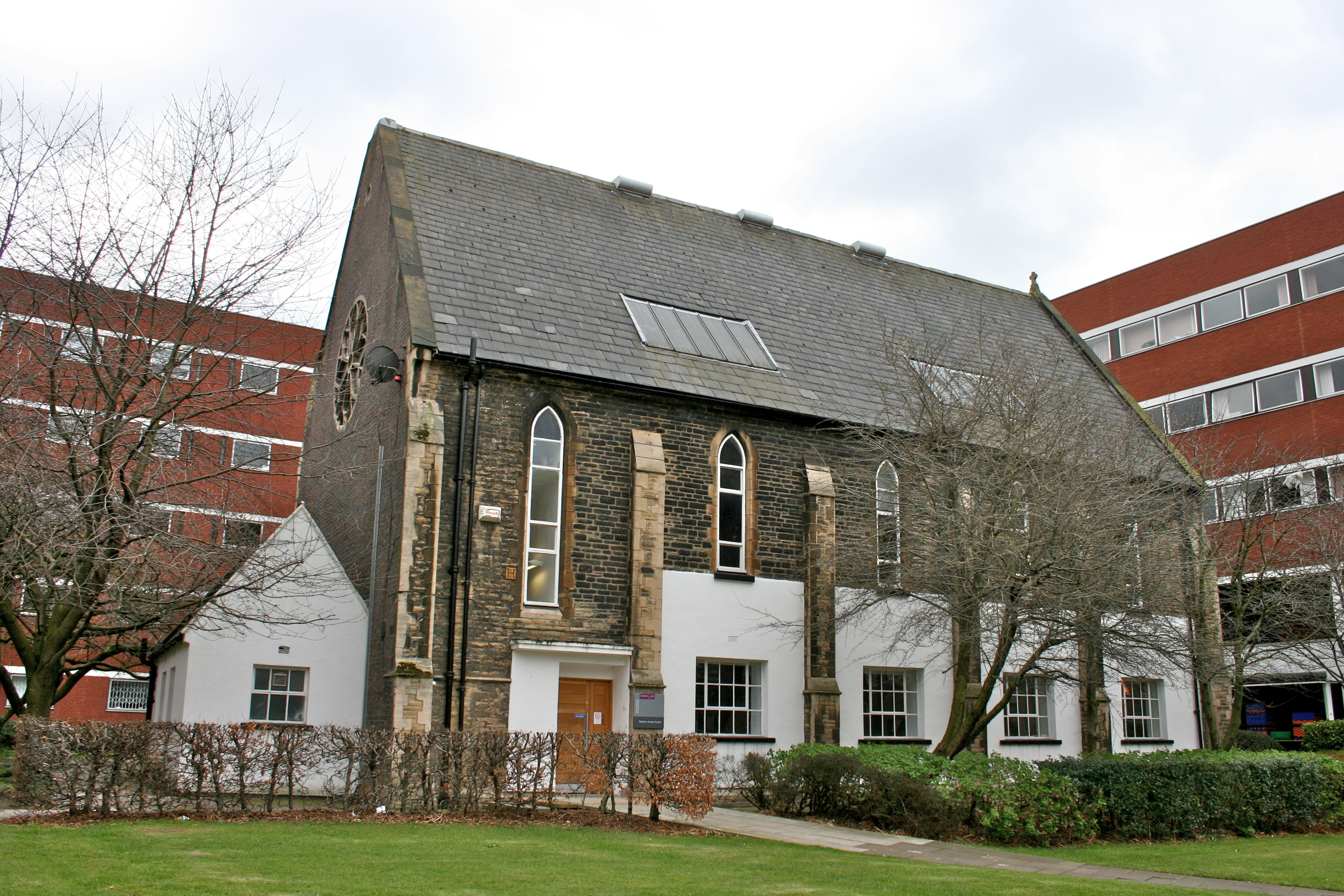
Former German Protestant Church (now Stephen Joseph Studio), Greenheys

Greenheys is an inner-city area of south Manchester, England, lying between Hulme to the north and west, Chorlton-on-Medlock to the east and Moss Side to the south.

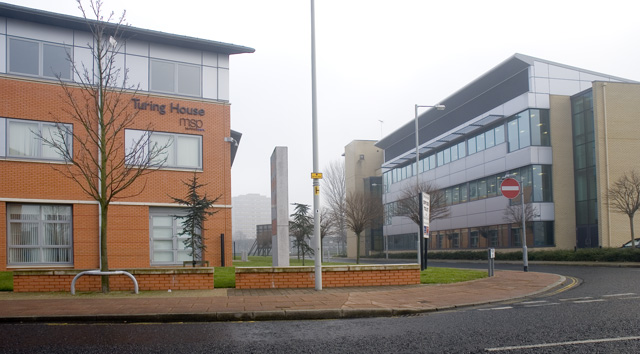
Turing House (left) in the science park

Elizabeth Gaskell's first novel, Mary Barton, published in 1848, opens with a description of Greenheys, then still a rural area on the outskirts of the city. The writer Thomas De Quincey and pioneer socialist Robert Owen both lived at Greenheys House, overlooking the now culverted Cornbrook river.

Manchester Science Park is on Pencroft Way, Lloyd Street North.

== Old Abbey Taphouse incident ==
On 30 September 1953, in an act of racial segregation, black boxer Len Johnson and his friends were refused service at the Old Abbey Taphouse pub in Greenheys on account of the colour of Johnson's skin. Manchester police were called to the pub and Johnson and his friends were thrown out. Johnson was angered by this and enlisted the help of the then-Lord Mayor of Manchester, and the Bishop of Manchester to combat the stance. Over the following three days, more than 200 people, black and white, gathered to take part in a demonstration outside of the pub. Eventually the ban was overturned and Johnson, who was teetotal, was invited inside the pub to share a drink with the publican. Their protest fuelled the momentum to end the colour bar policies of the era in the United Kingdom. The Race Relations Act 1965 eventually made racial discrimination in public places unlawful in a direct response to the colour bar. A mural exists outside of the pub dedicated to the event and Johnson's memory.

== See also ==
- Burlington Street drill hall
- Trinity Church of England High School
