= Alfred Robert Wilkinson =

Recipient of the Victoria Cross

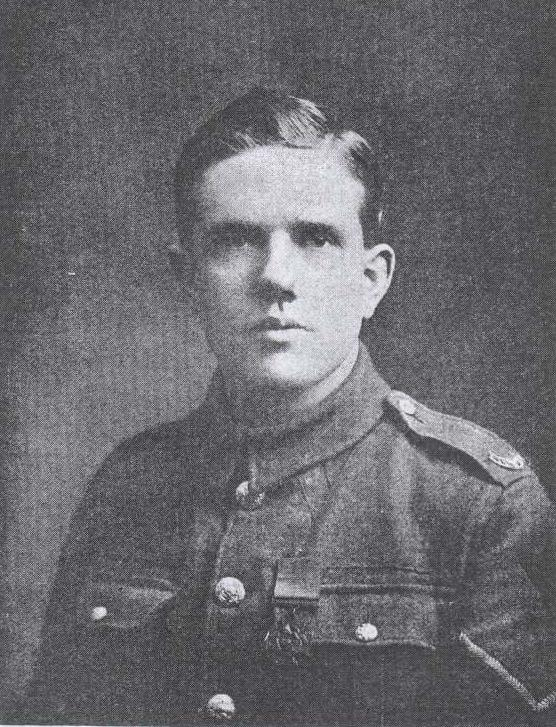
- Born: 5 December 1896; Leigh, Lancashire, England
- Died: 18 October 1940 (aged 43); Leigh, Lancashire, England
- Burial place: Leigh Cemetery (Plot 1-U, Grave 99)
- Military career
- Allegiance: United Kingdom
- Branch: British Army
- Rank: Lieutenant
- Units: Royal Scots Greys; Seaforth Highlanders; Manchester Regiment
- Conflicts: World War I
- Awards: Victoria Cross
- Other work: Coal miner

Alfred Robert Wilkinson VC (5 December 1896 – 18 October 1940), was an English recipient of the Victoria Cross, the highest and most prestigious award for gallantry in the face of the enemy that can be awarded to British and Commonwealth forces.

Wilkinson enlisted in the Royal Scots Greys at the outbreak of war in 1914 and transferred the following year to the 2nd. Battalion, Seaforth Highlanders. He finally transferred to the 1/5th Manchester Regiment and went to France in July 1916.

He was 21 years old, and a private in the 1/5th Battalion, The Manchester Regiment, British Army during the Battle of the Selle in the First World War when the following deed took place for which he was awarded the VC.

On 20 October 1918 at Marou, France, during the attack, four runners had been killed in attempting to deliver a message to the supporting company and Private Wilkinson volunteered for the duty. He succeeded in delivering the message although the journey involved exposure to extremely heavy machine-gun and shell fire for 600 yards.

He later achieved the rank of lieutenant. Wilkinson died in an incident at a laboratory at Bickershaw Colliery, Leigh, where he worked from carbon monoxide poisoning.

His gravestone at Leigh Cemetery has the VC engraved on it. In 2018 it had a trail of poppies leading to it which had been made by local school children.

A statue of Wilkinson has been erected (October 2018) on the green at Pennington Wharf, which is a housing estate at the old Bickershaw Colliery. The road around the green has also been named Wilkinson Park Drive. The road sign is gold in colour and has the VC printed on it.

A mural featuring Wilkinson has been painted on a house on Twist Lane, Leigh, situated between Dorothy Grove and Arthur Street.

== Bibliography ==
- Monuments to Courage (David Harvey, 1999)
- The Register of the Victoria Cross (This England, 1997)
- Gliddon, Gerald (2014) [2000]. The Final Days 1918. VCs of the First World War. Stroud, Gloucestershire: The History Press. ISBN 978-0-7509-5368-9.
