= Battle of Krithia Vineyard =

1915 battle during the First World War

- Part of First World War
Date	6–13 August 1915
Location	40.078°N 26.216°E; Helles, Gallipoli, Ottoman Empire
Result	Ottoman victory

Belligerents
British Empire	Ottoman Empire

Commanders and leaders
(United Kingdom of Great Britain and Ireland) Br-Gen. H.E. Street	(Ottoman Empire) Trommer Paşa (Ottoman Empire) Fevzi Çakmak

Strength
4 Divisions	6 Divisions

Casualties and losses
4,120 total	7,510 total

The Battle of Krithia Vineyard (6–13 August 1915) was fought during the Gallipoli Campaign during the First World War. It was originally intended as a minor British action at Helles on the Gallipoli peninsula to divert attention from the imminent launch of the August Offensive, but instead, the British commander, Brigadier General H.E. Street, mounted a futile and bloody series of attacks that in the end gained a small patch of ground known as "The Vineyard".

== Prelude ==
The original commander of the British VIII Corps at Helles, Lieutenant General Aylmer Hunter-Weston, had departed the peninsula in July, following the last Helles offensive—the Battle of Gully Ravine. His replacement, Lieutenant General Francis Davies, arrived in early August but had not yet assumed command of the corps when a series of diversions were due to be launched from Anzac and Helles to divert Ottoman attention from the planned landing at Suvla and the break out from Anzac. Consequently, the Helles diversion was planned and conducted by the VIII Corps' chief of staff, Brigadier General H.E. Street, who proved himself an able student of Hunter-Weston's battle strategy.

== Battle ==
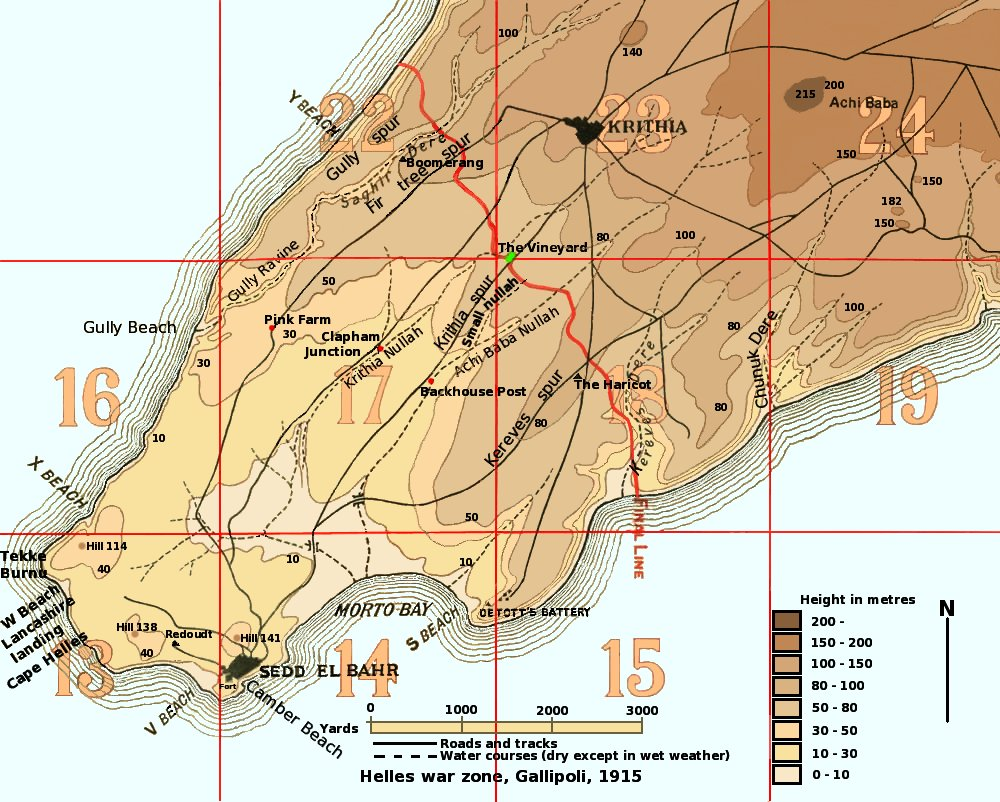
Map showing situation of Krithia Vineyard, just above the centre

Due to a shortage of artillery, the attack was split into two parts with the 88th Brigade of the 29th Division (with support on its right flank from the 1/5th Battalion, Manchester Regiment) attacking on the afternoon of 6 August while the 125th and 127th Brigades of the 42nd (East Lancashire) Division would attack early the following morning. The 52nd (Lowland) Infantry Division and the 63rd (Royal Naval) Division in Corps reserve. They were facing four Ottoman divisions, three of which were fresh, while there were two more divisions in reserve.

The 88th Brigade's attack managed to capture some Ottoman trenches, which were recaptured by the Ottoman 30th Regiment during a counter-attack. The British attacked again and once more captured some trenches, but the Ottomans counter-attacked again and drove them out. The British failed to hold any ground and the 88th Brigade reported casualties of 1,905 men, (fully 2/3 of the original Brigade strength), effectively destroying them as a fighting force. At around 9:40 am on the morning of 7 August the 42nd Division attacked on the right of the 88th Brigade's sector. The 127th Brigade managed to break through the line held by the Ottoman 13th Division, but were forced back by an Ottoman counter-attack.

The Ottomans counter-attacked repeatedly from 7 August to 9 August and the fighting in the area continued until 13 August when it finally subsided. Afterwards, this sector of the Helles front would remain one of the busiest and most violent for the remainder of the campaign.

== Aftermath ==
Two Victoria Crosses were awarded during the fighting at Krithia Vineyard. Lieutenant (temporary Captain) William Thomas Forshaw of the 1/9th Battalion Manchester Regiment, Territorial Force, of the 42nd (East Lancashire) Division, and Private David Ross Lauder of the 1/4th Royal Scots Fusiliers, Territorial Force, of the 52nd (Lowland) Division. The British casualties in the first 24 hours of fighting, covering the original attacks of the 88th Brigade and the 125th and 127th Brigades of the 42nd Division, were 3,469 (134 Officers and 3,335 other ranks). The total British casualties for the duration of the battle were probably in excess of 4,000. The Ottoman casualties for the period of the battle were estimated to be around 7,500.

As for the other diversion at Lone Pine, the attack failed to fulfill its goal of tying down the Ottoman reinforcements away from the main offensive. As early as the morning of 7 August, regiments were being dispatched from Helles to the main front in the Sari Bair range.
