= Villers-au-Flos =

- Commune
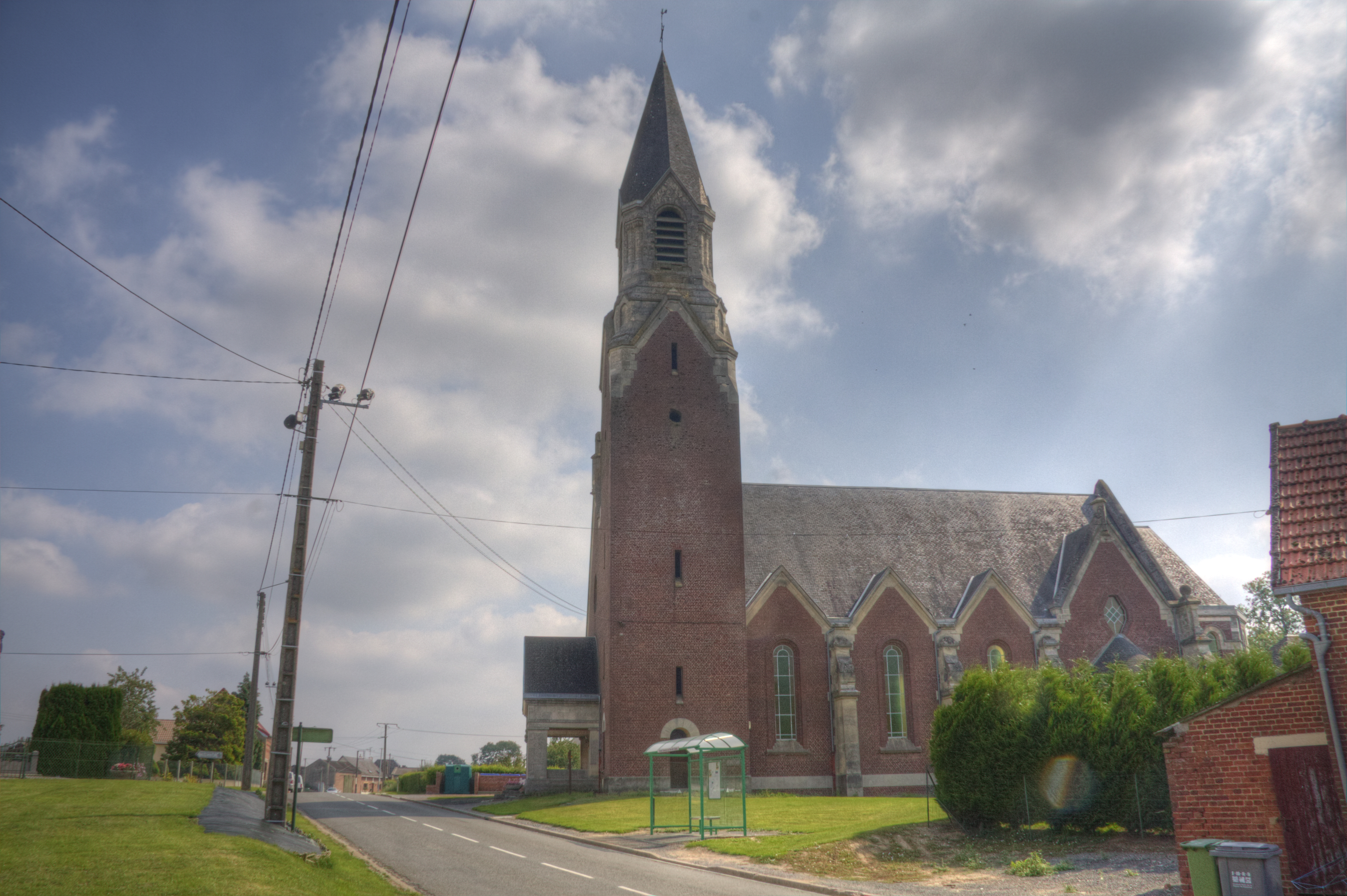
- The church of Villers-au-Flos
- Location of Villers-au-Flos
- Location within France Location within Hauts-de-France
- Coordinates: 50°04′54″N 2°54′15″E
- Country: France
- Region: Hauts-de-France
- Department: Pas-de-Calais
- Arrondissement: Arras
- Canton: Bapaume
- Intercommunality: CC Sud-Artois

Government
  - Mayor (2020–2026): Jean-Marie Lecornet
- Area^{1}: 5.8 km^{2} (2.2 sq mi)
- Elevation: 110 m (360 ft)
- Highest elevation: 133 m (436 ft)
- Lowest elevation: 113 m (371 ft)
- Population (2023): 245
  - Density: 42/km^{2} (110/sq mi)
- Time zone: UTC+01:00 (CET)
  - Summer (DST): UTC+02:00 (CEST)
- INSEE/Postal code: 62855 /62450
- ^{1} French Land Register data, which excludes lakes, ponds, glaciers > 1 km^{2} (0.386 sq mi or 247 acres) and river estuaries.

Villers-au-Flos (French pronunciation: [vilɛʁ o flo]) is a commune in the Pas-de-Calais department in the Hauts-de-France region of France.

== Geography ==
Villers-au-Flos is situated some 19 miles (31 km) south of Arras, near the junction of the D11 and N17 roads.

== Population ==
Historical population
| Year | Pop. | ±% p.a. |
|---|---|---|
| 1968 | 237 | — |
| 1975 | 202 | −2.26% |
| 1982 | 187 | −1.10% |
| 1990 | 192 | +0.33% |
| 1999 | 196 | +0.23% |
| 2007 | 184 | −0.79% |
| 2012 | 218 | +3.45% |
| 2017 | 272 | +4.53% |
| 2023 | 245 | −1.73% |
Source: INSEE

== Places of interest ==
- The church of St.Pierre, rebuilt, as was the rest of the village, after the First World War
- The German military cemetery

== See also ==
- Communes of the Pas-de-Calais department
