= 111th (Bolton) Field Regiment, Royal Artillery =

111th (Bolton) Field Regiment, RA
- Royal Artillery cap badge
- Active: 1 July 1939 – 10 November 1945
- Country: United Kingdom
- Branch: Territorial Army
- Role: Field artillery
- Size: 2–3 Batteries
- Part of: 66th Division; 42nd (East Lancashire) Division; Eighth Army; Floydforce
- Garrison/HQ: Silverwell Street, Bolton
- Engagements: Second Battle of El Alamein; Battle of Mareth; Mozzagrogna; Yugoslavia; Operation Mercerised

111th (Bolton) Field Regiment was a Royal Artillery (RA) unit of Britain's part-time Territorial Army (TA) formed just before World War II. It was descended from the Bolton Artillery, first formed in the Lancashire town of Bolton in 1889. After serving in home defence it was sent to the Middle East where it participated in the Second Battle of El Alamein and the Battle of Mareth. It served in the Italian Campaign, and was then transferred to Yugoslavia, fighting alongside Tito's Partisans. The regiment was disbanded at the end of the war.

== Mobilisation ==
With war approaching after the Munich Crisis, the Territorial Army was rapidly doubled in size. On 1 July 1939 53rd (Bolton) Field Regiment, Royal Artillery, split into two regiments:

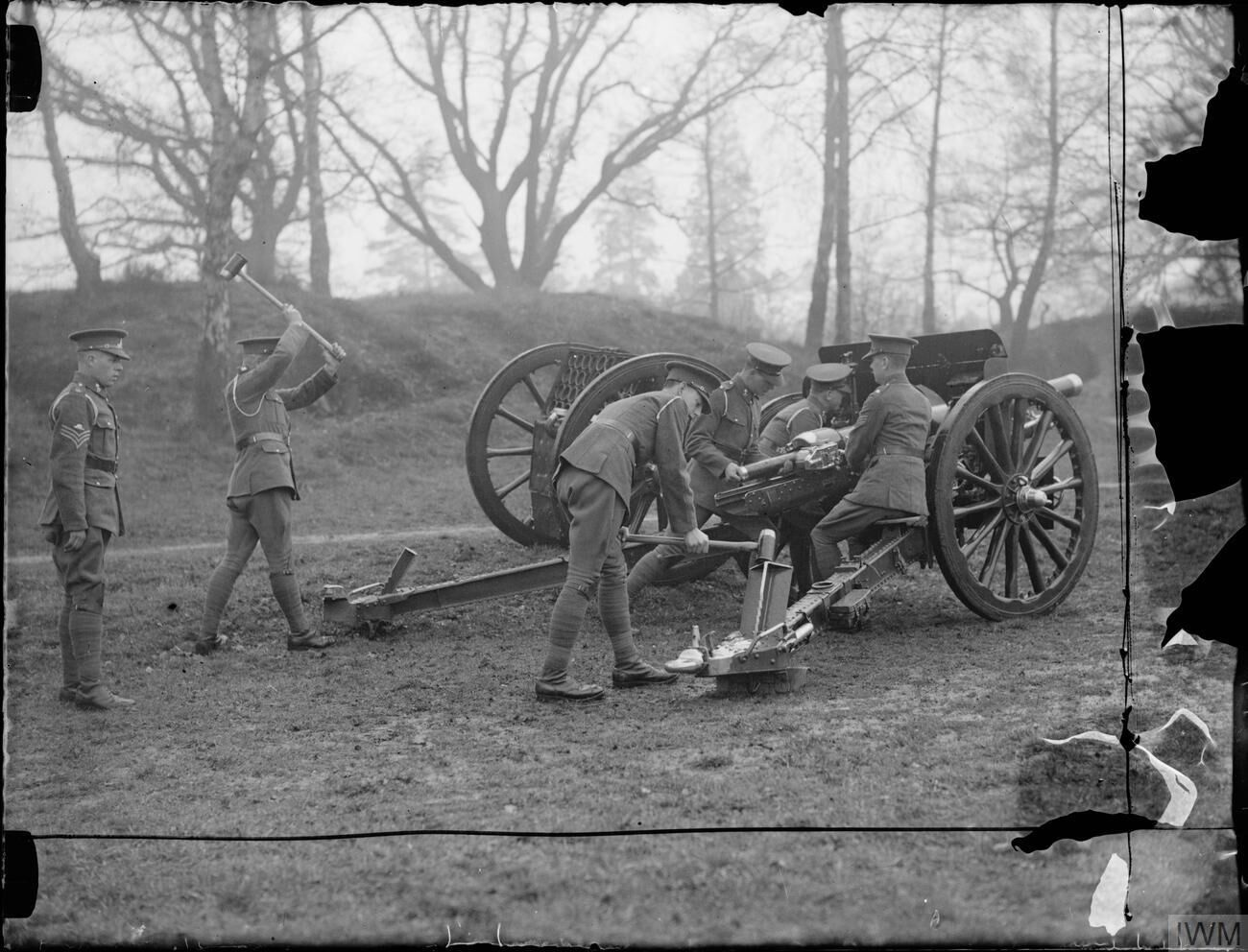
Emplacing an 18-pounder with wooden wheels at the start of World War II

53rd (Bolton) Field Regiment

- Regimental Headquarters (RHQ) at Silverwell Street, Bolton
- 209 (East Lancashire) Field Battery
- 210 (East Lancashire) Field Battery

111th Field Regiment

- RHQ at Bolton
- 211 (East Lancashire) Field Battery
- 212 (East Lancashire) Field Battery

The establishment of a field battery at this time was increased to three troops of 4 guns. The Bolton Artillery was still equipped with 18-pounders of World War I vintage on the outbreak of war.

Both regiments mobilised on 1 September 1939, just before the outbreak of war, as part of 42nd (East Lancashire) Infantry Division, but from 27 September the newly formed 66th Infantry Division took over the duplicate units including 111th Fd Rgt. While 42nd (EL) Division joined the British Expeditionary Force and fought in the Battle of France before being evacuated from Dunkirk, 66th Division underwent training in the UK

== Home defence ==
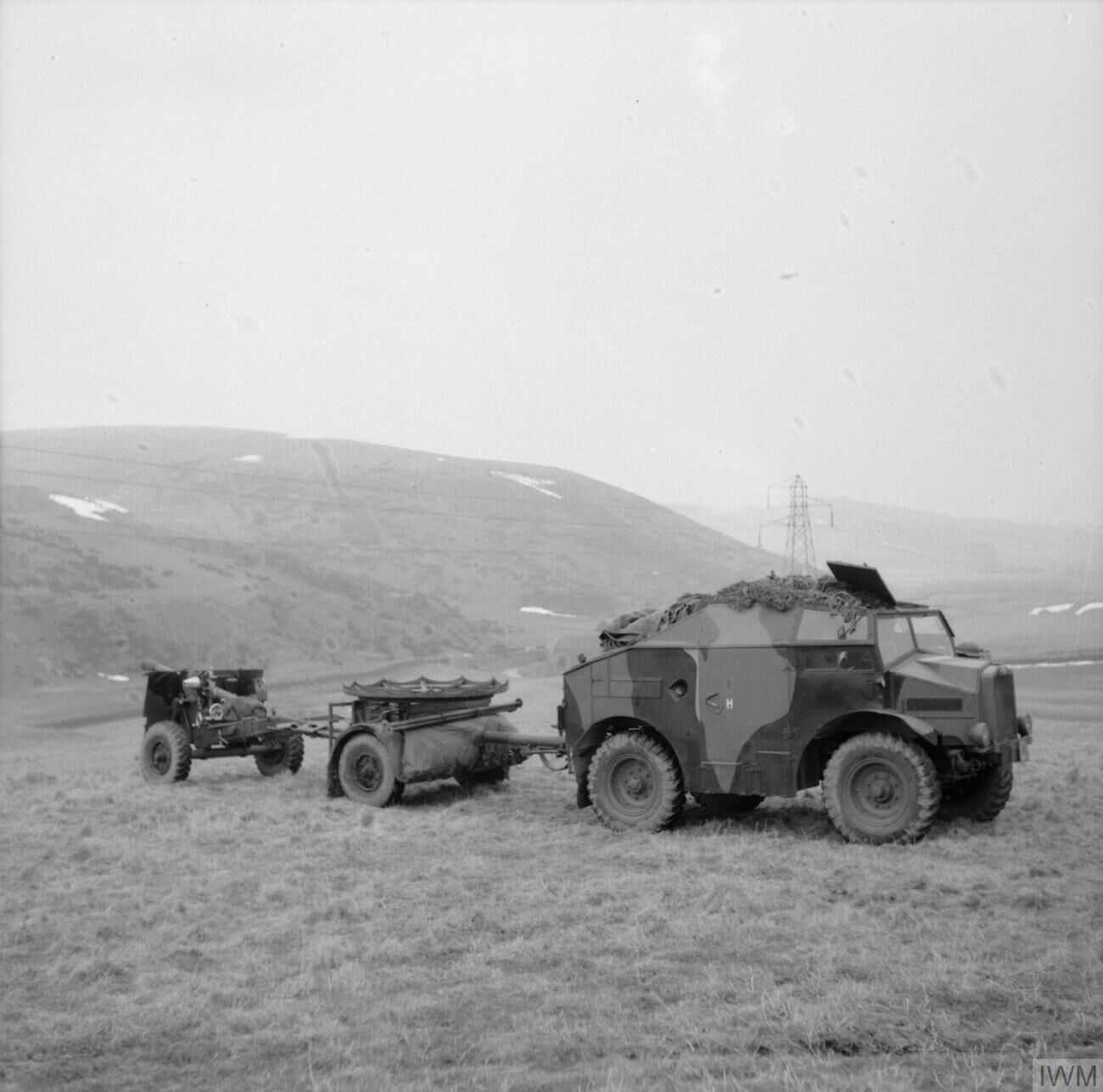
25-pounder gun and Quad tractor on exercise in Scotland, 1941

After the Dunkirk evacuation, Home Forces underwent a reorganisation to meet a potential German invasion. As part of this, 66th Division was disbanded on 23 June 1940 and 111th Fd Rgt reverted to 42nd (East Lancashire) Division from 3 July 1940. The regiment was eventually fully equipped with Mk II 25-pounder guns. One of the lessons learned from the Battle of France was that the two-battery organisation did not work: field regiments were intended to support an infantry brigade of three battalions. As a result, they were reorganised into three 8-gun batteries, but it was not until late 1940 that the RA had enough trained battery staffs to carry out the reorganisation. 111th Field Rgt accordingly formed its third battery, 'R Bty', while the regiment was stationed at Woodbridge, Suffolk, when 42nd (EL) Division was serving in XI Corps; this was numbered 476 Bty on 14 January 1941.

In the autumn of 1941 it was decided to convert 42nd (EL) Division into an armoured division. 111th Field Rgt left, and from 31 October 1941 it became an independent Army Field Rgt in Scottish Command, with a dedicated signal section from the Royal Corps of Signals and Light Aid Detachment (LAD) from the Royal Army Ordnance Corps (later Royal Electrical and Mechanical Engineers). On 17 February 1942 it was authorised to adopt the 'Bolton' subtitle of its parent regiment.

By mid-May 1942 the regiment had transferred from Scottish Command to War Office control preparatory to embarkation for overseas service. On 24 May 1942 it was joined by 102 A/T Bty from 14th A/T Rgt. Together they embarked for Egypt; after arrival the personnel of 102 A/T Bty left to join 95th A/T Rgt on 19 September.

== Alamein ==
In Egypt an order for the regiment to convert to 111th (Bolton) Medium Rgt was cancelled, and instead it was attached as a field regiment to 50th (Northumbrian) Division, temporarily replacing that division's 72nd (Northumbrian) Fd Rgt which had been destroyed at the Battle of Gazala. Eighth Army was preparing for the decisive Second Battle of Alamein, which was launched on the night of 23/24 October. 50th (N) Division's infantry was not engaged on the first night of the battle, but every available gun was utilised to fire a massive artillery barrage. The division failed to break through the enemy minefields on 25/26 October, but then reinforced 2nd New Zealand Division for the decisive second phase of the battle (Operation Supercharge).

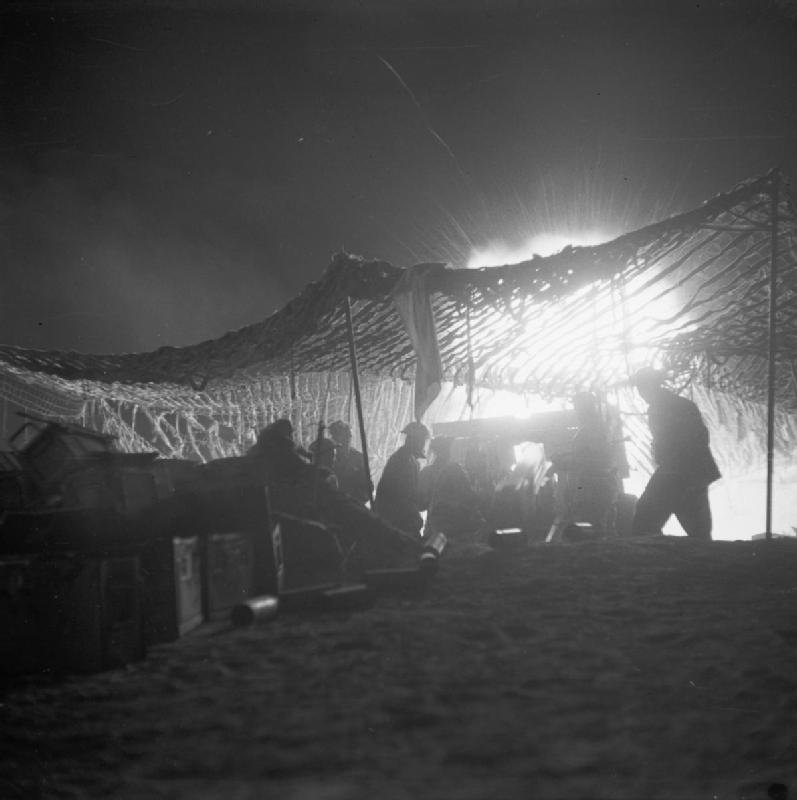
25-pounder in action during the Battle of the Mareth Line

After Alamein 111th Fd Rgt left 50th (N) Division on 21 November 1942 and reverted to Eighth Army command for the pursuit across North Africa. By March 1943, for the Battle of Mareth, it was attached to 2nd New Zealand Division HQ, which was operating as a temporary corps HQ. It had reverted to Eighth Army command by the time the Tunisian Campaign ended in May 1943.

== Italy ==
111th Field Rgt is reported to have been assigned to 6th Army Group Royal Artillery for the Allied invasion of Sicily (Operation Husky), and then served as an Army Fd Rgt in the Italian campaign from September 1943. The Germans took up a series of blocking positions, and in November were in the Bernhardt Line, behind the River Sangro. Eighth Army closed up to the river on 9 November and prepared to assault the position. For this operation 111st (Bolton) Fd Rgt was attached to 8th Indian Division, fighting alongside 53rd (Bolton) Fd Rgt.

78th Division developed a bridgehead, and on 27 November, after the flooded river had fallen, 8th Indian Division took Mozzagrogna on the escarpment beyond. A German counter-attack recaptured the village early on 28 November, but a fresh attack by 1st Bn 12th Frontier Force Regiment, accompanied by all the divisional and corps artillery, finally captured it by 01.30 on 29 November. The following night 1st Bn 5th Royal Gurkha Rifles and 1/12th FFR captured the dominating ground beyond Mozzagrogna, completing the rupture of the Bernhardt Line.

== Yugoslavia ==
In January 1944 a British force had been established on Vis, an island in the Adriatic Sea off the coast of Yugoslavia, in order to cooperate with the Yugoslav Partisans. By May 1944 Land Forces Adriatic (LFA) had despatched a sizeable garrison to defend the island, including 111th Field Rgt. From 16 August this force was known as Vis Brigade, changing to Adriatic Brigade on 10 November. In September the Germans began withdrawing from Greece, and LFA began sending forces to raid their lines of retreat along the Balkan coast as part of Operation Ratweek. One of these forces, Floydforce, formed around 2nd Battalion, Highland Light Infantry, sailed from LFA's Italian base at Bari, picked up a battery (8 x 25-pdrs) of 111th Fd Rgt and raided the island of Korčula on 14–17 September. A force based on No 43 Royal Marine Commando, with another battery of 111th Fd Rgt, raided Šolta on 19–23 September. A further operation was launched by No. 2 Commando against Sarandë on 22 September to block the German retreat from Corfu. This was only intended to last for 24–48 hours, but the situation was so favourable that the Commandos were sent reinforcements, including 25-pdrs of 111th Fd Rgt. Although bad weather hindered the operation, Sarandë was attacked and captured on 9 October.

Tito's Partisans were impressed by the power of the artillery in these raiding forces and began to demand help from British artillery. Floydforce launched another operation on 27 October 1944, landing at the city of Dubrovnik on the mainland, initially under Lt-Col C. de F. Jago, who had taken command of 111th Fd Rgt in September. Commandos accompanied the artillery purely as escorts: due to Tito's sensitivities they were not to take part in offensive operations, but Jago was warned that the Partisans operated as guerrillas, and if put under pressure by German forces they would disappear into the mountains. Once the commander of Vis Bde, Brig J.P. O'Brian Twohig, arrived to take over, Jago could concentrate on coordinating the British and Partisan artillery. The artillery under his command consisted of:

- 111th (Bolton) Fd Rgt (25-pdrs) (Note: The Official History wrongly lists 11th Fd Rgt in a footnote, but in all other cases refers to 111th Fd Rgt.)
- A troop of 180 HAA Bty, 64th (Northumbrian) Heavy Anti-Aircraft Regiment (3.7-inch guns)
- A section of 101 LAA Bty, 31st Light Anti-Aircraft Regiment (40 mm Bofors guns)
- A troop of E Bty, Raiding Support Regiment (4 x 75 mm mountain howitzers)

Second line transport to support Jago's artillery was provided by 3-ton trucks loaned by 25th Anti-Aircraft Brigade at Bari, and an artillery platoon of the Royal Army Service Corps. Movement was hampered by the state of the mountain roads, which had been subjected to demolitions by both sides, and the lack of practicable gun positions on rocky hillsides. The nearest German positions were at Risan on the Bay of Kotor. The main and secondary roads were blocked by demolitions, but by travelling 47 miles (76 km) over a tortuous mountain route the leading troop of 211 Fd Bty came into action on 30 October with its observation posts overlooking Risan. The Germans held two old Austrian fortified villages and the gunners found that the only way to breach the old walls was to use a combination of armour-piercing (AP) and high explosive (HE) shells, a slow but effective process. Risan was entered on 21 November after some 150 tons of HE shells had been expended, and 'Evidence of the effectiveness of the British artillery fire was apparent everywhere'. With the Risan escape route now blocked, a German thrust through Nikšić seemed likely, so Twohig moved his force there, to fight a defensive battle in the Zeta Valley with his field and mountain guns covered by No 43 (RM) Commando in cooperation with the 2nd Partisan Corps under General Radovan Vukanović. Air reconnaissance revealed the approach road to be 'black' with German motor transport, but before this inviting target could be engaged by the guns and the RAF's Balkan Air Force, Vukanović ordered all the British guns except 212 Fd Bty and the 75 mm troop back to Dubrovnik for political reasons.

On 5 December the Partisans' mood became more cooperative as a result of fresh instructions from Tito's HQ. An operation to airlift guns to interrupt the continuing German withdrawals was prevented by bad weather. Instead a small force of 25-pdrs set off from Dubrovnik towards Podgorica under the second-in-command of 111th Fd Rgt with a Commando escort and detachment of 579 Army Field Company, Royal Engineers. The journey took four days in driving rain, and at one point the sappers had to erect a 100 yards (91 m) Bailey bridge so that the gun column could get through. Before the guns could fire a round they were once again ordered back to Dubrovnik by Vukanović. However, Twohig persuaded him that 212 Fd Bty should advance from Niksic to bring the German columns within range. The road ahead was on a mountainside, with 31 separate demolitions before Danilovgrad, where the main bridge was down, then further demolitions beyond. For three days over 1000 Partisan men and women, and every available British soldier, worked to open the road. On the night of 13/14 December 212 Fd Bty, reinforced by some of the long-range 3.7-inch HAA guns, deployed within range of the German positions outside Podgorica. For the next 11 days the guns were edged forward as fast as the sappers and engineers could open tracks for them. The first shoot on 14 December expended 30 tons of ammunition and Vukanović was so encouraged that he authorised 476 Fd Bty also to be brought forward on 16 December, with the CO of 111th Fd Rgt in command. Fire plans had to be made with the sketchiest of information from the Partisans: on one occasion the guns were about to pound Podgorica itself when news arrived just in time that the town had fallen to the Partisans. Instead, 2500 rounds were fired at the main German withdrawal route. The guns reached the town on 20 December. The Germans had destroyed the river bridges, the gaps were too wide for the available Bailey equipment, and the current was too fast for a pontoon bridge, but directed by air observation post aircraft the gunners harassed the German rearguards until they were out of range on 24 December. Observers later reported on the devastation inflicted by the 25-pdrs and the Balkan Air Force on the retreating road columns.

Floydforce returned to Dubrovnik on 26 December and prepared for operations against Mostar, but were not called upon by the Yugoslavs. Lieutenant-Col Jago had left the regiment in December to become chief of staff to LFA. On 17 January 1945 Allied landing craft arrived to begin withdrawing the force to Italy, and all troops had left by the end of the month. Hostilities on the Italian Front ended on 2 May with the Surrender of Caserta, and demobilisation got under way shortly afterwards. 111th (Bolton) Field Rgt passed into suspended animation on 10 November 1945. When the Territorial Army was reconstituted on 1 January 1947, 111th (Bolton) Field Rgt was formally disbanded.
