= 53rd (Bolton) Field Regiment, Royal Artillery =

53rd (Bolton) Field Regiment, RA 253 (Bolton) Field Regiment, RA
- Royal Artillery cap badge
- Active: 1921–1 April 1967
- Country: United Kingdom
- Branch: Territorial Army
- Role: Field artillery
- Size: 2–4 Batteries
- Part of: 42nd (East Lancashire) Division; 76th Infantry Division; 8th Indian Division
- Garrison/HQ: Silverwell Street, Bolton
- Engagements: Battle of France; Dunkirk evacuation Barbara Line; Mozzagrogna; Operation Diadem; Operation Olive; Operation Grapeshot

53rd (Bolton) Field Regiment was a Royal Artillery (RA) unit of Britain's part-time Territorial Army (TA) during World War II. It was descended from the Bolton Artillery, first formed in the Lancashire town of Bolton in 1889. It served in the Battle of France, at the end of which its personnel were evacuated from Dunkirk. It was then sent to the Middle East where it joined 8th Indian Division and fought with this division in the Italian Campaign. It was reformed in the postwar TA, and its successor unit continues as a battery in the present day Army Reserve

== Origin ==
The Bolton Artillery was formed as part of the Volunteer Force in 1889. By the outbreak of World War I it was a 'brigade' (Note: In contemporary RA usage a brigade was a lieutenant-colonel's command consisting of independent batteries 'brigaded' together; it was not comparable with an infantry or cavalry brigade commanded by a brigadier-general.) of the Royal Field Artillery (RFA) in the East Lancashire Division of the Territorial Force. During World War I it served with the division (later the 42nd (East Lancashire) Division) in Egypt, Gallipoli, and on the Western Front. It reformed after the war, becoming the 53rd (Bolton) Brigade, RFA, when the TF was reorganised as the Territorial Army (TA) in 1921, with the following organisation:

- Brigade Headquarters at Silverwell Street, Bolton
- 209, 210, 211 (East Lancashire) Batteries
- 212 (East Lancashire) Battery (Howitzer)

The brigade was once again part of 42nd (EL) Divisional Artillery. In 1924 the RFA was subsumed into the Royal Artillery (RA), and the word 'Field' was inserted into the titles of its brigades and batteries. In 1938 the RA modernised its nomenclature and a lieutenant-colonel's command was designated a 'regiment' rather than a 'brigade'; this applied to TA field brigades from 1 November 1938.

After the Munich Crisis the TA was rapidly expanded. On 8 April 1939 Harry Goslin, captain of the Bolton Wanderers football team, announced to the crowd at Burnden Park that after the match he and his team would go to the TA drill hall to sign up. Most of the team was posted to 53rd (Bolton) Field Regiment.

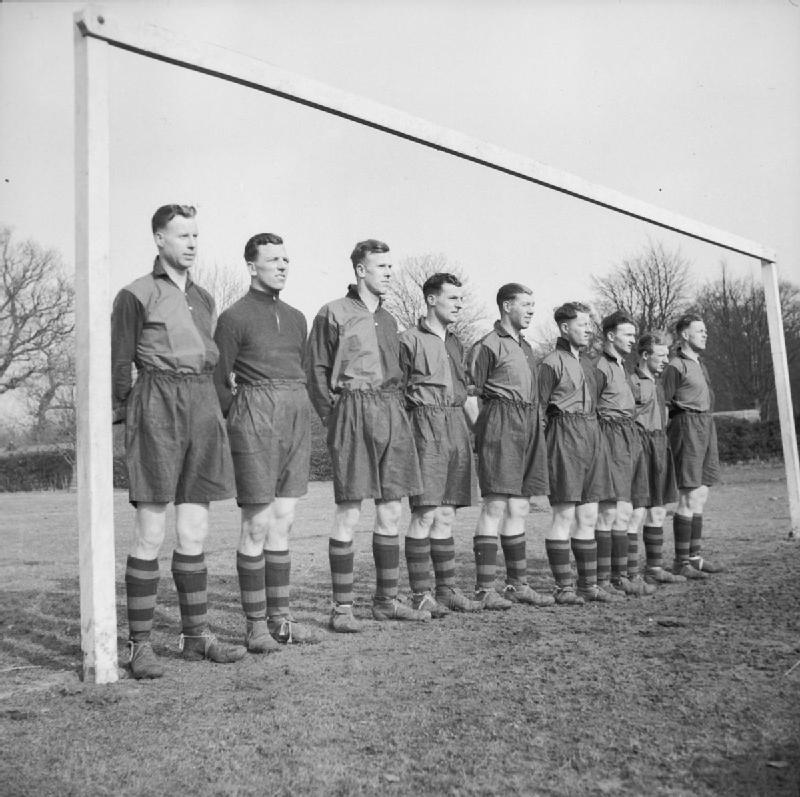
Members of the prewar Bolton Wanderers team who played for 53rd (Bolton) Field Rgt when it was stationed at Beccles in Suffolk.

With the expansion of the TA, most regiments formed duplicates. Part of the reorganisation was that field regiments changed from four six-gun batteries to an establishment of two batteries, each of three four-gun troops. For the Bolton Artillery this resulted in the following organisation from 25 May 1939:

53rd (Bolton) Field Regiment

- Regimental Headquarters (RHQ) at Silverwell Street, Bolton
- 209 (East Lancashire) Field Bty
- 210 (East Lancashire) Field Bty

111th Field Regiment (Note: On 17 February 1942 111th Fd Rgt was authorised to use its parent unit's 'Bolton' subtitle.)

- RHQ at Bolton
- 211 (East Lancashire) Field Bty
- 212 (East Lancashire) Field Bty

== World War II ==
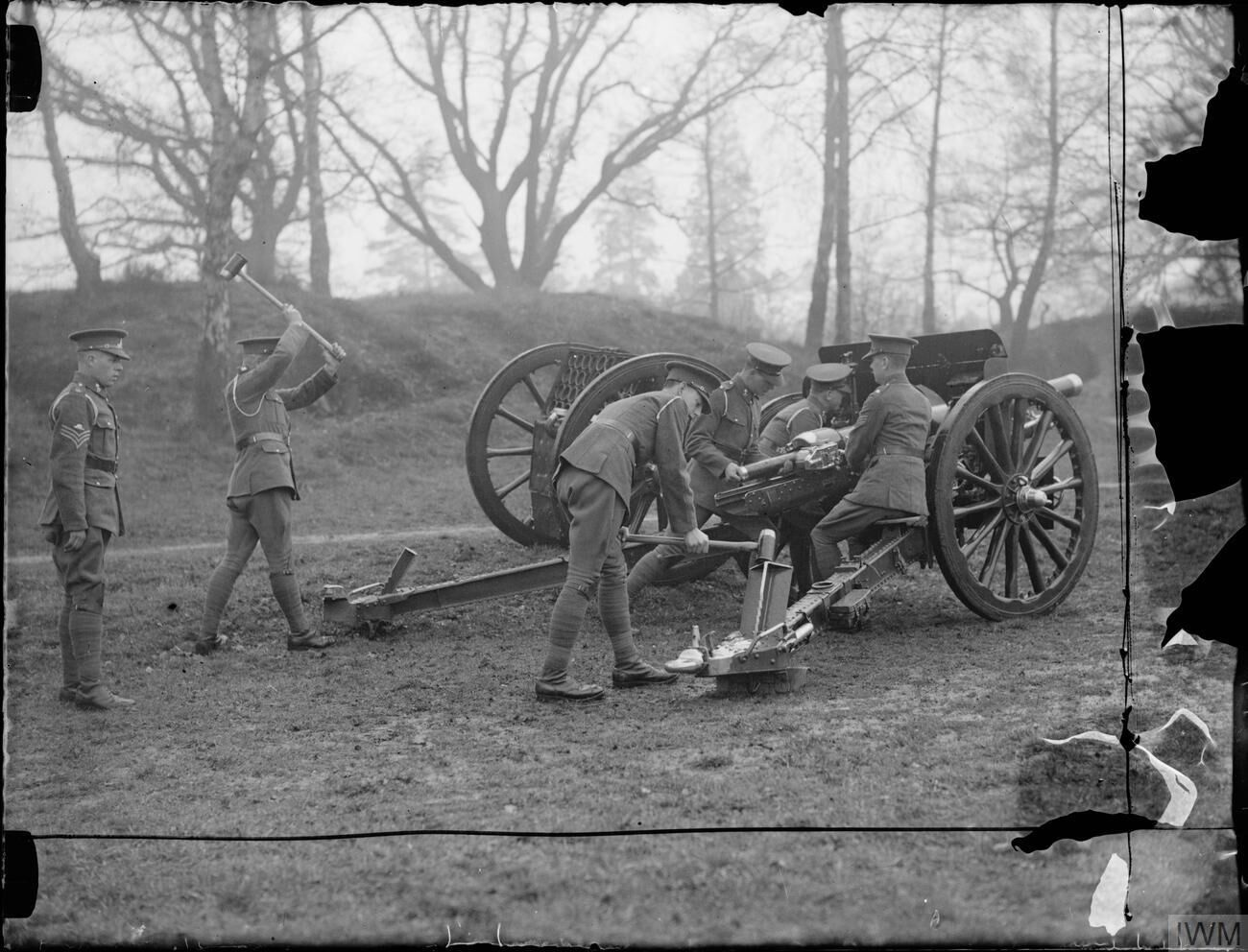
Emplacing an 18-pounder with wooden wheels at the start of World War II.

The Bolton Artillery mobilised on 1 September 1939, just before the outbreak of war, as part of 42nd (EL) Infantry Division, but from 27 September the newly formed 66th Infantry Division took over the duplicate units including 111th Fd Rgt. 53rd (Bolton) Fd Rgt was still equipped with 18-pounders on the outbreak of war. It went to Swindon when 42nd (EL) division was training in Berkshire and Wiltshire. In April 1940 the division began crossing to France to join the British Expeditionary Force (BEF).

When the German offensive began on 10 May, the BEF advanced into Belgium under Plan D, and by 15 May its leading divisions were in place on the River Dyle. 42nd (EL) Division was to move up to reserve positions on the River Escaut in France. 53rd Field Rgt took up positions at Froidment on 15 May with 100 rounds dumped by each gun, and remained there during 16 and 17 May. It opened fire on Defensive Fire (DF) tasks at 08.25 on 18 May and fired all day, receiving some sporadic CB fire in return. The following day the regiment engaged a large number of targets, mainly vehicles and horsedrawn artillery. The regiment fired 6000 rounds in its first 36 hours of war.

But the Wehrmacht's breakthrough in the Ardennes threatened the BEF's flank, and it had to retreat again. By 21 May the whole BEF was back on the Escaut. As the Germans thrust behind the BEF, 42nd (EL) Division found itself south of Lille and facing east. By 26 May 53rd Fd Rgt was fighting hard in the area of Lambersart when orders came to move to Dunkirk. The decision had been made to evacuate the BEF through that port (Operation Dynamo). The personnel of 42nd Divisional Artillery including 53rd Fd Rgt were evacuated on 30 May

=== Home Defence ===
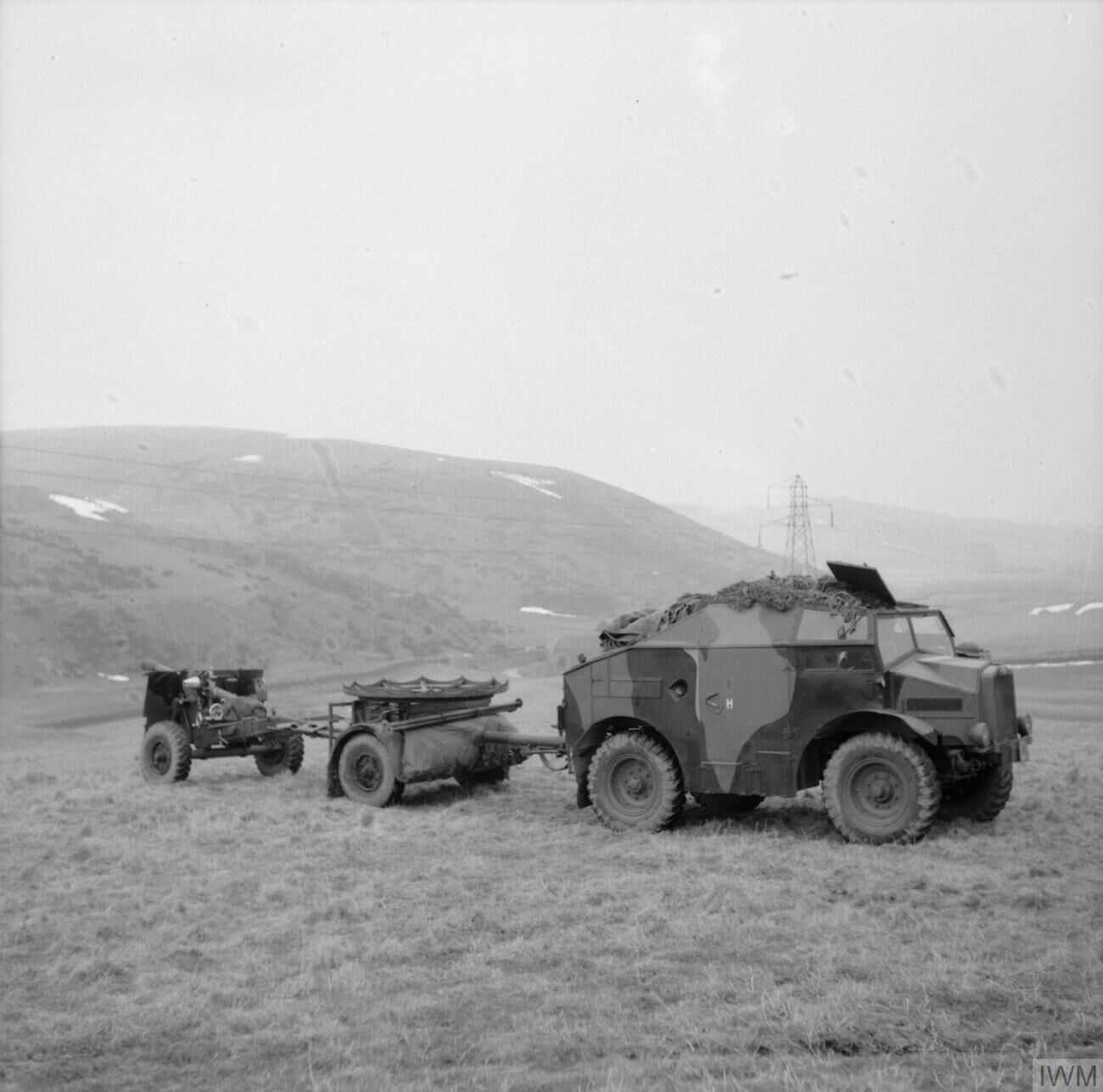
25-pounder gun and Quad tractor on exercise in the UK, 1941.

Units returning from France were rapidly reinforced, re-equipped with whatever was available, and deployed for home defence. 53rd Field Rgt concentrated at Newcastle upon Tyne and then moved to Bedale in North Yorkshire where the division assembled. 42nd (EL) Division went south to join IV Corps in September and the regiment was stationed at Wokingham while the division trained in Berkshire. The regiment was eventually fully equipped with Mk II 25-pounder guns. One of the lessons learned from the Battle of France was that the two-battery organisation did not work: field regiments were intended to support an infantry brigade of three battalions. As a result, they were reorganised into three 8-gun batteries, but it was not until late 1940 that the RA had enough trained battery staffs to carry out the reorganisation. 53rd Field Rgt accordingly formed 438 Fd Bty on 29 March 1941 while the regiment was stationed at Woodbridge, Suffolk, when 42nd (EL) Division was serving in XI Corps.

53rd (Bolton) Field Rgt fielded a football team (the Wartime Wanderers) based on the Bolton Wanderers players who had joined up in 1939. The team was photographed while the regiment was stationed in Suffolk, and later played an 'international' match against Polish troops whole stationed in Iraq.

In the autumn of 1941 it was decided to convert 42nd (EL) Division into an armoured division. 52nd (Manchester) and 53rd (Bolton) Fd Rgts left on 20 October, and 111th Fd Rgt at the end of the month. 52nd and 53rd joined 76th Infantry Division defending Norfolk. During 1942 large reinforcements were sent from the UK to Middle East Forces, and 52nd and 53rd Fd Rgts were chosen to join them. 53rd Field Rgt left 76th Division on 6 June 1942 and embarked for the Middle East with S Bty of 100th (Gordon Highlanders) Anti-Tank Rgt attached.

=== Alamein ===
Once the regiment arrived in Egypt, the personnel of S A/T Bty left to join 149th (Lancashire Yeomanry) A/T Rgt on 19 September. Eighth Army was preparing for the decisive Second Battle of Alamein, for which 53rd Fd Rgt was attached to 44th (Home Counties) Division.

44th (HC) Division was to lead one of XIII Corps' thrusts through the enemy minefields on the first night, 23/24 October (Operation Lightfoot), following a massive artillery barrage. A route was found through the first belt of minefields ('January') on the first night and 44th (HC) Division succeeded in passing the second minefield ('February') the next night, but the armour was unable to exploit beyond. The second phase of the offensive, Operation Supercharge, was launched on the night of 27/28 October. Eventually, the armour broke through, and next day came signs that the enemy was withdrawing. 44th (HC) Division took some part in the pursuit to El Agheila, collecting prisoners, but XIII Corps was short of transport and was left behind as Eighth Army drove westwards. Shortly afterwards 44th (HC) Division HQ was disbanded, and its units distributed.

=== Iraq ===
53rd Field Rgt now became an army level unit in Middle East Forces. The regiment moved to Iraq, arriving on 3 January 1943, when it came under the command of 8th Indian Division (along with 52nd (Manchester) Fd Rgt). The division was in Tenth Army, forming part of Paiforce defending the vital oilfields of Iraq and Persia and the line of communications with the Soviet Union. By the spring of 1943 the victories in North Africa and on the Eastern Front had removed the threat to the oilfields, and troops could be released from Paiforce for other theatres. 8th Indian Division moved to Ninth Army in Syria with 53rd Fd Rgt arriving on 30 April 1943.

8th Indian Division was then selected for the forthcoming Italian Campaign. 53rd Field Rgt arrived back in Egypt on 13 September and then embarked with the division for Italy on 18 September.

=== Italy ===
8th Indian Division began disembarking at Brindisi on 23 September, where 53rd Fd Rgt arrived next day. The division joined V Corps, which was leading Eight Army's advance up the east coast of Italy. Operations were slowed by rain and mud, but on the night of 1/2 November 8 Indian Division began attacking across the River Trigno, part of the Barbara Line. 1st Battalion 13th Frontier Force Rifles fought its way up the wooded spurs against the German 3rd Parachute Regiment, and the following night 3rd Bn 8th Punjab Regiment crossed the river to add its weight. On the night of 3/4 November the two battalions attacked Tufillo, 'taking in their stride a German counter-attack which was blown to pieces by the divisional artillery'. There was confused fighting in the dark amongst burning scrub, and by morning the two battalions were pinned down under heavy fire. The Germans were however being forced to thin out their defences, and the paratroopers withdrew, allowing the whole of 8th Indian Division to advance.

==== Mozzagrogna ====
The Germans took up another delaying position, the Bernhardt Line, behind the River Sangro. Eighth Army closed up to the river on 9 November and prepared to assault the position. 78th Division developed a bridgehead, and on 27 November, after the flooded river had fallen, 8th Indian Division took Mozzagrogna on the escarpment beyond. A German counter-attack recaptured the village early on 28 November, but a fresh attack by 1st Bn 12th Frontier Force Regiment, accompanied by all the divisional and corps artillery, finally captured it by 01.30 on 29 November. The following night 1st Bn 5th Royal Gurkha Rifles and 1/12th FFR captured the dominating ground beyond Mozzagrogna, completing the rupture of the Bernhardt Line. The division continued to advance with short, powerfully supported attacks against stubborn resistance, where artillery ammunition supply became the limiting factor. Winter weather brought an end to operations in late December.

During the fighting on the Sangro the former footballer Harry Goslin, by then a lieutenant with a Military Cross, was killed by mortar fire on 18 December while acting as a forward observation officer for his battery.

==== Monte Cassino ====
Eighth Army regrouped during the winter months, and 8th Indian Division moved to XIII Corps for the Spring offensive. This corps would be operating in the Liri Valley as part of the renewed attack on Monte Cassino (Operation Diadem). First XIII Corps carried out a setpiece assault crossing of the Rapido or Gari River (part of the German Gustav line), with an artillery programme starting at 23.00 on 11 May. Every gun was employed for the next 12 hours in counter-battery (CB) and counter-mortar fire, with the field guns concentrating on the German mortars and Nebelwerfers. At 00.45 on 12 May 8th Indian Division launched its assault boats and the field guns switched to providing a Creeping barrage, followed by timed concentrations on selected targets. A dense mist screened the assault points but caused confusion for the attackers and both attacking brigades got left behind by the barrage. Nevertheless, after hard fighting they achieved a bridgehead and before nightfall the Sappers had laid two bridges to allow tanks to cross. Next day 1/5th Gurkha Rifles, supported by tanks and seven field artillery regiments, took the village of San Angelo at the third attempt, and on 14 and 15 May the division cleared the tongue of land between the Liri and the Gari and pressed on westwards as the Germans fell back to the Hitler Line.

The artillery had to be brought up before the next bound, the advance north of the Liri on 25 May, but then its CB fire totally suppressed the German artillery, which fell silent every time an air observation post spotter aircraft appeared. While the armoured divisions advanced up the roads, the lightly equipped 8th Indian Division took to the narrow tracks through the hills, driving German rearguards from the hilltop towns. On the night on 1/2 June the division moved cross-country to Vico nel Lazio, bridging streams and gullies as it went and reaching the town on the afternoon of 3 June. The Germans then pulled back to the Trasimene Line and Fifth US Army entered Rome next day.

For the pursuit to Lake Trasimeno, 8th Indian Division came under X Corps, leading its advance on minor roads through the hill country east of Rome. Perugia was captured without much opposition on 19/20 June, then X Corps struck north up the Tiber Valley, with 8th Indian Division making for Sansepolcro. On 26 June it caught an unprepared German division and inflicted heavy casualties. 8th Indian Division had been in almost continuous fighting for nine months, and was now relieved for rest and refit.

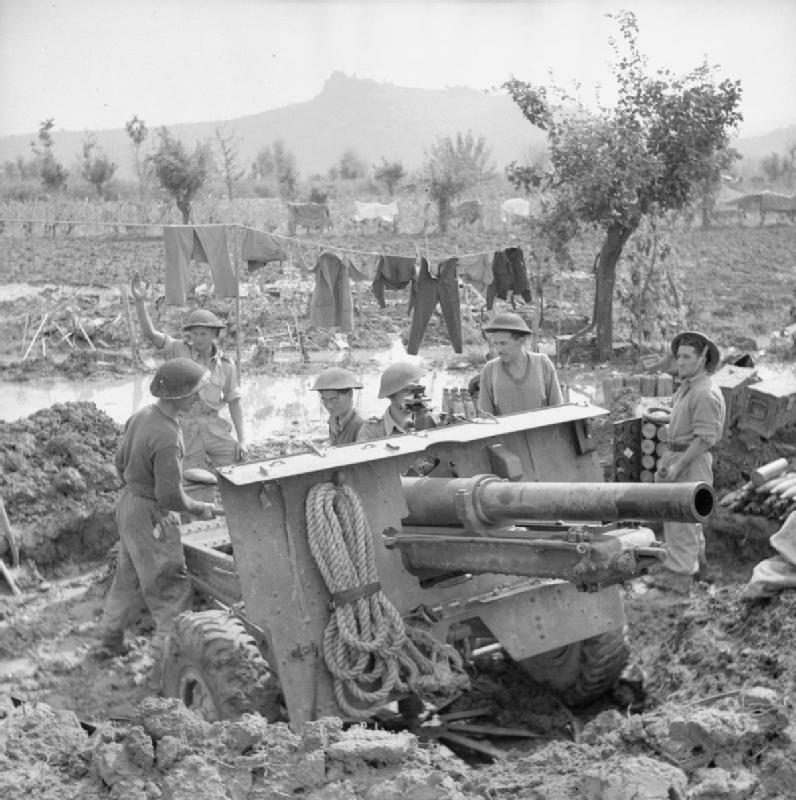
A 25-pounder crew in a waterlogged position in Italy, 1944.

==== Operation Olive ====
8th Indian Division returned to the front line with XIII Corps in the Elsa Valley later in July. The corps employed its overwhelming superiority in artillery to drive towards Florence, which the Germans evacuated. The forces then had to be regrouped to attack the Gothic Line in Operation Olive. 8th Indian Division crossed the River Arno in a preliminary operation on 21 August, and then advanced into the roadless mountains where it could not take its artillery. It captured Monte Femmina Morta on 18 September, easing the advance through the Casaglia Pass. Afterwards it advanced down the Faenza road, opening the routes into the Lamone Valley for heavy equipment and supplies, but further progress through the mountains was slow. The gunners had particular problems in firing over crests to hit targets behind. The division maintained pressure on the German positions during October to prevent them moving troops elsewhere. Artillery ammunition had to be rationed from November, but 8th Indian Divisional Artillery, operating in the critical junction between Eighth Army and Fifth US Army, was exempt and received ample supplies. The division kept up small offensive operations into the winter, despite the supply difficulties in the mountains. On 26 December the Germans launched a counter-attack (the Battle of Garfagnana) between Lucca and Pistoia towards Livorno, but 8th Indian Division had already been rushed west to bolster the US sector concerned. The Germans broke through until they were stopped at the Indians' positions, when 8th Indian Division took over control of the sector, but the German attack was not pressed. The division was relieved for rest on 8 January 1945.

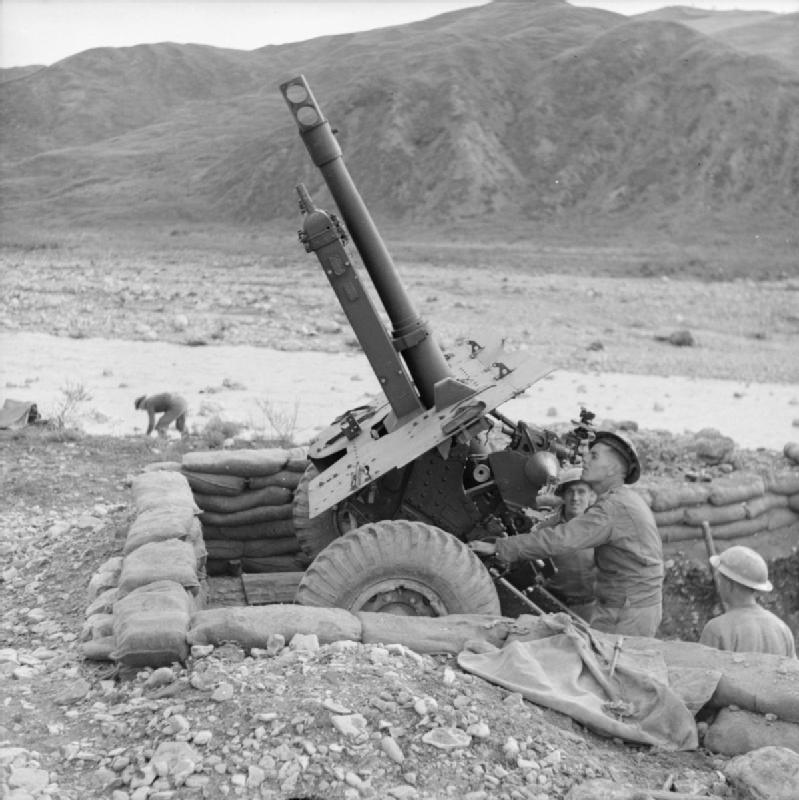
A 25-pounder in a gun pit adapted to gain maximum elevation, Italy 1944.

==== Operation Grapeshot ====
8th Indian Division was back with Eighth Army for the Allies' spring offensive in Italy, Operation Grapeshot. It was given the task of an assault crossing of the River Senio, with massive artillery support added to its own guns, and ample ammunition stocks built up during the winter. The German positions, dug into the floodbank of the river, presented a challenging linear target, so many of the guns fired in enfilade from the flanks. The operation was launched on 9 April. At 15.00 the assault troops withdrew to a safe distance while the artillery and air bombardment was carried out. Then at 19.20 the assault infantry went in, with a protective barrage laid on the far side of the river. Opposition remained strong on 8th Indian Division's front, but after bitter fighting through the night it secured its objectives by midday on 10 April. It then fought its way forward to the River Santerno and secured crossings during the night of 11/12 April. 78th Division then passed through 8th Indian Division to continue the advance. As Eighth Army advanced towards the River Po, 8th Indian Division came back into the widening line, attacking up the Via Adriatica until it ran into opposition at the airfield south-west of Ferrara on 22 April. After a 36-hour fight the division thrust round the western city of the city and got to the Po on 23 April, possibly the first troops of Eighth Army to reach it. The division then planned for another assault crossing, but German resistance was crumbling and opposition to its crossing on the night of 25/26 April was negligible. The division was then 'grounded' as its transport was taken to support Eighth Army's rapid drive to Venice and Trieste.

Hostilities on the Italian Front ended on 2 May with the Surrender of Caserta, but 8th Indian Division had already been withdrawn from the line on 29 April. It had been selected as the first Indian formation to transfer from Italy to the Far East theatre to fight the Japanese. It left in June 1945, when all the British units attached to it reverted to the British establishment and returned home. 53rd Field Rgt and the other units had been overseas for over two years and most of their personnel were due for repatriation under the government's 'Python' scheme. 53rd (Bolton) Fd Rgt embarked for the UK on 20 June. Back in the UK it was reorganised as 53rd (Field) Holding Regiment (with four batteries designated A to D) to handle gunners being reposted and awaiting demobilisation. It passed into suspended animation on 2 June 1946.

== Postwar ==
The TA was reconstituted on 1 January 1947, when 53rd Fd Rgt was reformed as 253 (Bolton) Fd Rgt in 42nd (Lancashire) Division.

Just before its annual camp on 10 June 1955 the regiment absorbed some personnel from 652 (5th Battalion Manchester Regiment) Heavy Anti-Aircraft Rgt, which was disbanding following the abolition of Anti-Aircraft Command.

The TA was reorganised on 1 May 1961, when Q Bty of 253 Rgt left to join 436 (South Lancashire Artillery) Light Anti-Aircraft Rgt and was replaced by Q (Salford) Bty from 314 Heavy Anti-Aircraft Rgt.

When the TA was reduced into the Territorial and Army Volunteer Reserve (TAVR) on 1 April 1967, 253 Rgt provided F Troop (The Bolton Artillery) of 209 (Manchester Artillery) Light Air Defence Battery in 103 (Lancashire Artillery Volunteers) Light AD Rgt. F Troop was later expanded, and continues today as 216 (Bolton Artillery) Battery in 103 (Lancashire Artillery Volunteers) Rgt.

== Memorials ==
The Bolton Artillery Memorial consists of a stone cenotaph standing in Nelson Square Gardens in Bolton. It lists 151 members of the Bolton Artillery who died in World War II. Two wooden panels listing 153 names for World War II are in the Army Reserve Centre at Nelson Street, Bolton, having originally been in the Bolton Artillery's drill hall at Silverwell Street. Also at the Army Reserve Centre having been at the Silverwell Street drill hall is a framed roll of honour listing the 15 members of the Bolton Artillery's Sergeants' Mess who died in World War II. A small plaque to the members of the Bolton Artillery who died in the two world wars was erected in St Peter's Church, Bolton, in 2003.

== See also ==
- Photos of 53rd (Bolton) Field Regiment in World War II at Bolton's Memories.
