= Operation Floxo =

WWII British Army unit in Yugoslavia

- Part of World War II in Yugoslavia
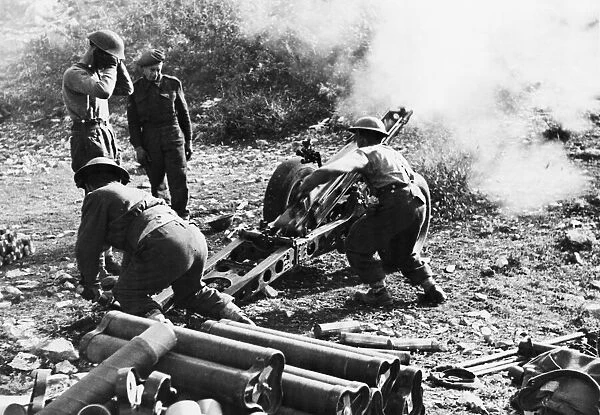
- A section of 31st Light AA Battery, Royal Artillery 75mm mountain Howitzers pound the German garrison at Risan from a distance of 1,200 yards.
- Location: Yugoslavia
- Planned: United Kingdom
- Commanded by: 'Floydforce': Brigadier J P O'Brien-Twohig; 'Finneyforce': Major Pat Turner
- Objective: Supporting Yugoslav Partisans during Axis withdrawal from Greece and Albania
- Date: 30 October – 22 December 1944
- Executed by: British Army
- Outcome: Operational success
- Casualties: German - 300–400; British/Partisan – unknown

Operation Floxo was an intervention by the British Army in Yugoslavia in October 1944, during the Second World War. The operation's main objective was to aid Yugoslav Partisans, led by Marshal Tito, in preventing the German withdrawal from Greece and Albania via Montenegro, and "to give the greatest possible artillery support to the Yugoslav National Army of Liberation".

== Background ==
Following the Maclean Mission and in Tito's meeting with Winston Churchill in Naples in August 1943, British Government policy was to support and supply the Communist partisans.

The following year as Allied troops from the East and West were moving towards the German borders, they realised that large German military formations such as Army Group E would eventually abandon Greece, Albania and Yugoslavia and withdraw to defence lines further north. This would reinvigorate and resupply their troops in the region and likely extend the war.

In September 1944, Operation Ratweek was launched, aiming to frustrate German movements through Serbia, Croatia and Slovenia. The secondary route in Montenegro was to be disrupted as well. The mountainous terrain made aerial bombardment unsuitable, so heavy artillery and land troops were to be deployed. The Partisans, equipped with only small arms and used to hand-to-hand warfare, had neither the long-range guns nor the experience. After a number of successful raiding operations by the British on islands in the Adriatic, the Partisans were impressed by the power of their artillery and began to demand help with its use. With this the British began to devise a plan to help the Partisans, and from it Operation Floxo was set up.

== Floxo ==
=== Arrival ===
A British combat unit was put together with two units; the first known as 'Floydforce' which consisted of batteries from 111th (Bolton) Field Regiment, Royal Artillery, No. 43 (Royal Marine) Commando and 579th Army Field Company, Royal Engineers. Commanded by Brigadier J P O'Brien-Twohig, it sailed in four Landing craft, tank (LCT) and three Landing Craft, Infantry (LCI) from Bari to Dubrovnik on 27 October 1944 and arrived the following day. Another dedicated group, named 'Finney Force' which consisted of 211 Field Battery with eight 25-pounder guns and 'C' Troop of No. 43 Commando. The Battery Commander Major Pat Turner was in overall command, while 'C' Troop was led by Captain Robert Loundoun. The two commanders travelled via Trebinje, Bileća and Vilusi, to reach Podhan - a strategic location from which they could see and shell the German troops in the town of Risan, Ledenice barracks and in five old Imperial Austrian forts nearby. They arrived on 29 October, preparing for the first battle the following morning. Their first target was to block the German breakout at Risan, along the coastal route of the Bay of Kotor.

=== Battle of Risan ===
The advanced guard of German Army Group E, the XXI Mountain Corps, had already entered Montenegro and used a narrow, meandering road that follows the Bay of Kotor, eventually reaching Risan.

On October 30 the British fought their first action, when they became the first British Army unit to fight directly alongside communists. Both the Partisans and the British gunners on the high rock shelf, 1,600 feet above the bay, could see German movements and once the weather had cleared, heavy bombardment started. After seeing the volume and accuracy of the shelling, the Germans realised that they were not dealing with Partisans, but rather much better trained and equipped army units. Some tried to surrender to the British, hoping for better treatment, but it had already been agreed that all prisoners of war were to be handed over to the Partisans.

By 4 November, the bombardment had been so heavy that an attempt was made to ask Germans to surrender where they were barricaded in a local sawmill and hospital. The negotiations failed and three days later the first German fort was breached, and two days later the second. The Germans tried to send reinforcements from Kotor to Risan via the narrow and winding road. They also assembled a force at Mostar, 75 miles north-west, in order to free them up, but these were successfully contained by the local Partisans.

By this time, the decision had been made to blow up the road and at least damage it enough to prevent heavy vehicles crossing. Captain Loundoun led the expedition which laid explosives in a culvert about two miles from Risan. This operation was successful.

By 17 November, the last three forts fell and Ledenice barracks surrendered. The Germans suffered 43 dead and over 70 wounded, and 197 were taken prisoner. Shortly after, the Germans withdrew from Risan as well, and the town was taken over by the Partisans. One of the three routes, the southernmost one, was now closed off and Finney Force achieved its objective and withdrew to Bileća to await further instructions.

=== Podgorica and withdrawal ===
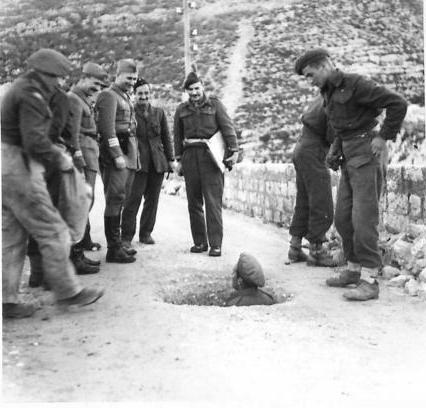
British and Partisan commanders visit the bridge at Nikšić, which is prepared for demolition by Royal Engineer sappers to hamper the German retreat

The second, central, route for withdrawal was via Danilovgrad and Nikšić. British contingent consisting of Raiding Support Regiment, a troop of 43 Commando and No. 579 Field Company of the Royal Engineers gathered the troops and heavy artillery at Nikšić and prepared to demolish the 150 yard-long stone bridge nearby, should the need arise. However, the Partisans were able to enter Danilovgrad, thus making this route impassable for the Germans, leaving only the difficult northernmost route via Kolašin.

The bulk of German troops was already on Montenegrin territory, in the town of Podgorica, desperate for a way north. On 5 December, Major W. H. Cheesman took a convoy of troops, heavy guns and a detachment of sappers with a flat-packed Bailey bridge to Risan. They knew the terrain well, as they had monitored and shelled it for weeks. Once in Risan, they followed the road to Kotor, installing and crossing the Bailey bridge on the way. After a couple of days on the coast, the mission reached Cetinje on 9 December. Just as they were preparing to continue on to Podgorica, an order was received to return to Vilusi, where their journey had started. They duly withdrew, taking back the Bailey bridge as ordered.

Meanwhile, the troops remaining in Nikšić prepared to move on to Danilovgrad via a heavily damaged road. They passed the town on 13 December and started bringing artillery forward towards Podgorica and the road to Bioče, German's last remaining route. Heavy shelling started and lasted until 19 December together with aerial bombardment by the Balkan Air Force. Podgorica was liberated, and the pursuit of the Germans to Bioče and Kolašin continued. By 22 December, there was a diminishing number of targets that could be visually identified, and the risk of shooting at Partisans in error increased. This was the last day of British active intervention, and the troops and equipment were brought back to Italy to assist in the campaign the following month.

== Aftermath ==
Floydforce was an unusual and somewhat strained operation. It spanned significant ideological, geopolitical and military contradictions.

"Those were the first shots of the first battle to have been fought by the only British body of formed troops to have soldiered alongside a Communist army on the European mainland during the Second World War."

— McConville, p. 277

At the same time, the Partisans feared a bigger British landing and intervention. The British Government still hosted and supported the Royal Yugoslav Government-in-Exile, as well as King Peter II of Yugoslavia. Finally, the futures of Istria, Rijeka and Trieste were yet to be decided. Winston Churchill thought of this as the key stumbling block and wrote to Tito on 3 December:

"You seem to be treating us in an increasingly invidious fashion. It may be that you have fears that your ambitions about occupying Italian territories of the north Adriatic lead you to view with suspicion and dislike every military operation on your coast we make against the Germans. I have already assured you that all territorial questions will be reserved for the Peace Conference. And they will be judged irrespective of wartime occupation. And certainly such issues ought not to hamper military operations now."

— Winston Churchill, McConville, p. 297

Tito was visiting Stalin in Moscow when the news of British units' arrival was received. Tito reassured Stalin that it must have been just a few batteries of artillery that he had asked for. Stalin then questioned what would he do if the British really tried to land against his will in Yugoslavia. Tito replied, "We should offer determined resistance."

== Sources ==
- Forty, Simon; Forty, Jonathan (2023). A Photographic History of Amphibious Warfare 1939-1945. Pen and Sword. ISBN 9781399082686.
- Maclean, Fitzroy (1991). Eastern Approaches. London: Penguin Books. ISBN 978-0-141-04284-8.
- Maclean, Fitzroy (1957). Heretic. New York: Harper & Brothers. LCCN 57-6130.
- McConville, Michael (2007). A Small War in the Balkans. Uckfield: The Naval & Military Press Ltd. ISBN 978-1-847347-13-8.
- Williams, Heather (2003). Parachutes, Patriots, and Partisans. London: C. Hurst & Co. (Publishers) Ltd. ISBN 1-85065-592-8.
