= Mozzagrogna =

- Comune
- Comune di Mozzagrogna
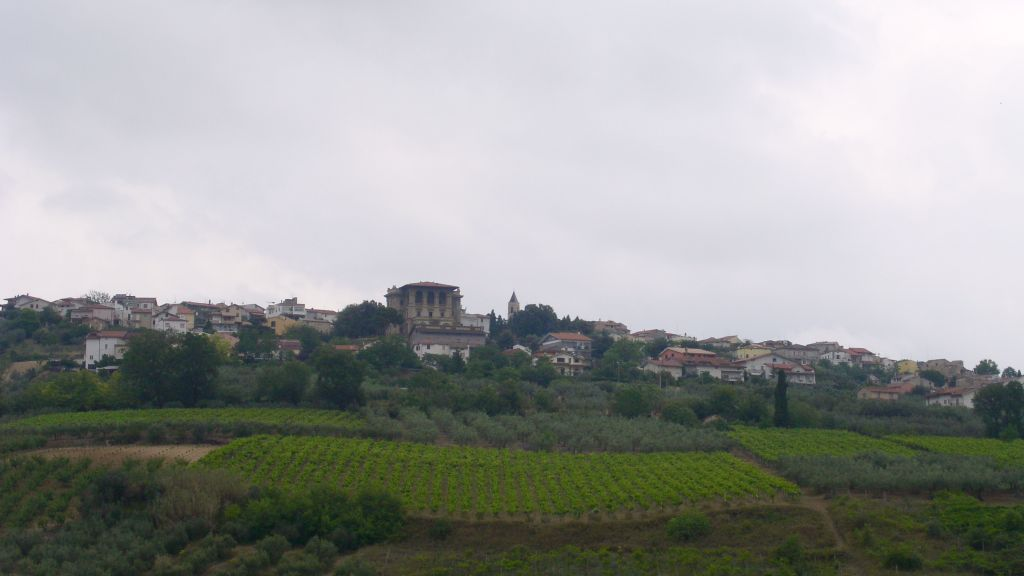
- View of Mozzagrogna

- Location within Italy Location within Abruzzo
- Coordinates: 42°12′41″N 14°26′45″E
- Country: Italy
- Region: Abruzzo
- Province: Chieti (CH)
- Frazioni: Castel di Sette, Castelli, Cavezza, Colle Ruzzo, Cornice, Cuna Re di Coppe, Fonte della Noce, Lucianetti, Ponticelli, Rosciavizza, Villa Romagnoli

Government
  - Mayor: Domenico Cianfrone

Area
  - Total: 13.71 km^{2} (5.29 sq mi)
- Elevation: 223 m (732 ft)

Population (31 July 2025)
  - Total: 2,431
  - Density: 177.3/km^{2} (459.2/sq mi)
- Demonym: Mozzagrognesi
- Time zone: UTC+1 (CET)
  - Summer (DST): UTC+2 (CEST)
- Postal code: 66030
- Dialing code: 0872
- Patron saint: St. Roch
- Saint day: 16 August
- Website: Official website

Mozzagrogna (locally Li Scavùne) is a comune (municipality) and town in the province of Chieti in the Abruzzo region of central Italy.
