= 137th Brigade =

137th Brigade may refer to:

- 137th Armoured Brigade, United Kingdom
- 137th Infantry Brigade, United Kingdom
- 137th (Staffordshire) Brigade, United Kingdom

== See also ==
- 137th Division (disambiguation)
- 137th Regiment (disambiguation)
