= 17th (Service) Battalion, Sherwood Foresters (Welbeck Rangers) =

- Active: 1 June 1915–21 February 1918
- Allegiance: United Kingdom
- Branch: New Army
- Type: Pals battalion
- Role: Infantry
- Size: One Battalion
- Part of: 39th Division
- Garrison/HQ: Nottingham
- Patron: Mayor of Nottingham
- Engagements: Battle of the Somme; Battle of the Ancre; Third Battle of Ypres

The 17th (Service) Battalion, Sherwood Foresters (Welbeck Rangers), ('17th Sherwoods') was an infantry unit recruited from Nottinghamshire] as part of 'Kitchener's Army' in World War I. It served on the Western Front, at the battles of the Somme and the Ancre. It then fought through the Third Ypres Offensive, distinguishing itself at Pilckem Ridge and the Menin Road before being broken up in early 1918 to provide reinforcements to other battalions.

== Recruitment ==
Alfred Leete's recruitment poster for Kitchener's Army.

On 6 August 1914, less than 48 hours after Britain's declaration of war, Parliament sanctioned an increase of 500,000 men for the Regular British Army. The newly-appointed Secretary of State for War, Earl Kitchener of Khartoum, issued his famous call to arms: 'Your King and Country Need You', urging the first 100,000 volunteers to come forward. Men flooded into the recruiting offices and the 'first hundred thousand' were enlisted within days. This group of six divisions with supporting arms became known as Kitchener's First New Army, or 'K1'. The K2, K3 and K4 battalions, brigades and divisions followed soon afterwards. But the flood of volunteers overwhelmed the ability of the Army to absorb them, and the K5 units were largely raised by local initiative rather than at regimental depots, often from men from particular localities or backgrounds who wished to serve together: these were known as 'Pals battalions'. The 'Pals' phenomenon quickly spread across the country, as local recruiting committees offered complete units to the War Office (WO). One such unit was the Welbeck Rangers raised by the Mayor of Nottingham and a recruiting committee, who had already raised a Bantam battalion as the 15th (Service) Battalion of the local regiment, the Sherwood Foresters (Nottinghamshire and Derbyshire Regiment). The new battalion was accepted on 1 June 1915 as the 17th (Service) Bn of the Sherwoods, with the subtitle 'Welbeck Rangers' (Welbeck was a North Nottinghamshire mining village and stately home.) Major Ernest Hales (a reserve officer of the Durham Light Infantry) was appointed commanding officer (CO) of the new battalion on 17 June with the rank of Lieutenant-Colonel.

== Training ==
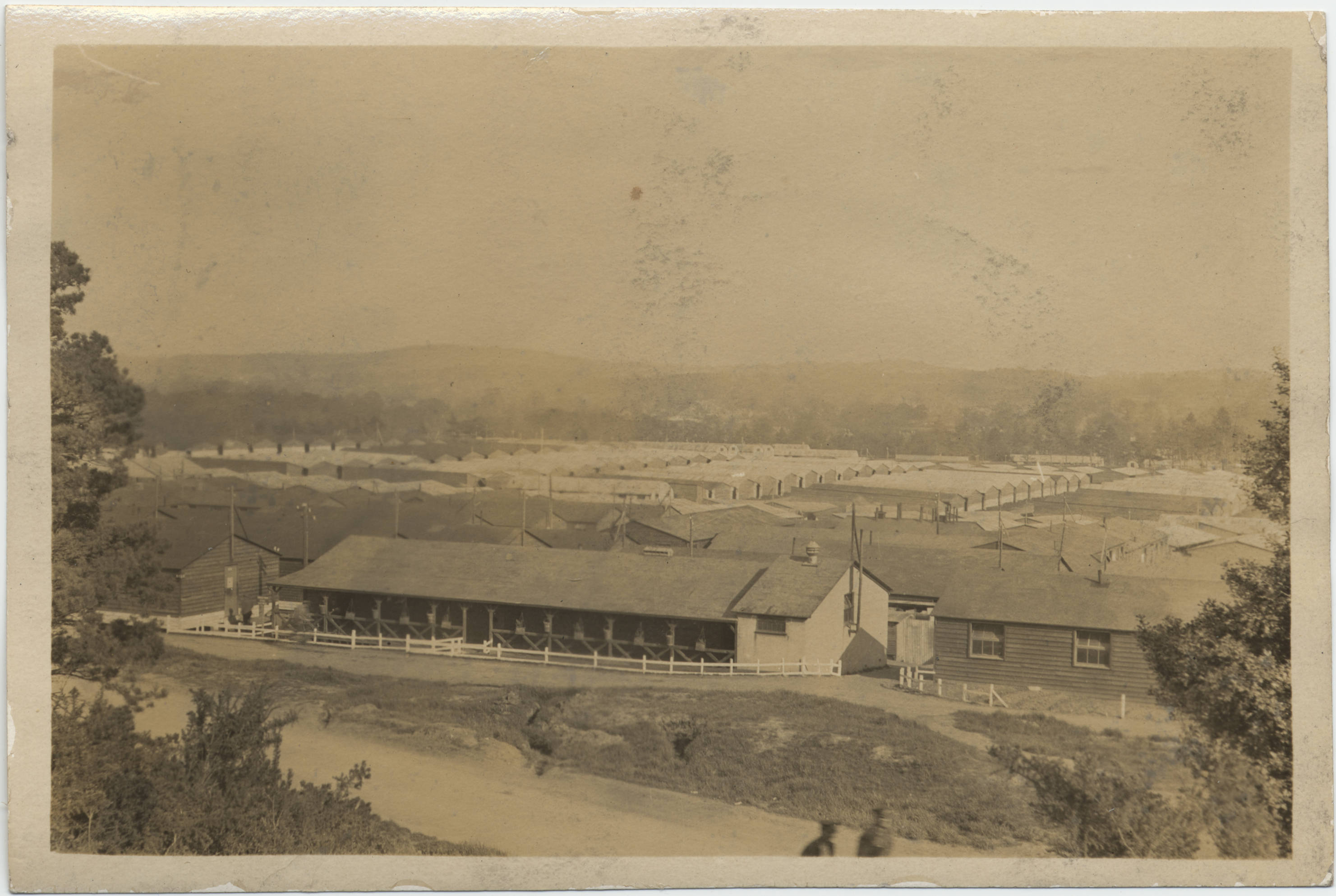
Witley Camp, where 17th Sherwood Foresters trained.

17th Sherwoods carried out its basic training at Nottingham. The battalion formally became part of 117th Brigade when that was formed on 15 July in 39th Division. It was brigaded with the 16th (Service) Battalion, Sherwood Foresters (Chatsworth Rifles), the 17th (Service) Battalion, King's Royal Rifle Corps (British Empire League) (17th KRRC) and the 16th (Service) Battalion, Rifle Brigade (St Pancras) (16th RB). In October the battalion moved to Aldershot to join 117th Bde. Here the brigade began progressive training, at platoon, company and finally battalion level, while specialist sections such as machine gunners, signallers and bombers were formed and trained. In November 17th Sherwoods carried out a route march to Witley Camp in Surrey, where training emphasised entrenching; apart from a brief spell back at Aldershot in January 1916 to carry out its musketry course with newly-issued rifles, 17th Sherwoods remained at Witley for the rest of its training.

=== 19th (Reserve) Battalion ===
The battalion's depot companies were amalgamated with those of the 15th (Nottingham Bantams) and 16th (Chatsworth Rifles) battalions of the Sherwood Foresters on 18 August 1915 at Brocklesby in Lincolnshire to form the 19th (Reserve) Battalion as a Local Reserve to provide reinforcements for the three pals battalions. The 19th Battalion moved to Ripon in North Yorkshire and joined 19th Reserve Brigade. In January 1916 it was at Harrogate and in July at Durham. On 1 September 1916 the Local Reserve battalions were transferred to the Training Reserve (TR) and the battalion was absorbed into other battalions of 19th (Reserve) Bde.

== Service ==
39th Division received its mobilisation orders in February 1916, and after some delays 17th Sherwoods left on three trains from Milford Station on 6 March for Southampton Docks to embark for France aboard the transports Archangel, Inventor and Connaught. It landed at Le Havre next day, and then went by train to 117th Bde's concentration area at Steenbecque in the First Army area. After further training 117th Brigade was attached to the experienced 8th Division for its introduction to Trench warfare, with 17th Sherwoods going to 23rd Bde at Estaires. A and B Companies were attached to the 2nd Bn Middlesex Regiment in the trenches on 19 March. On 22 March they returned to Estaires and C and D Companies went into the trenches with 2nd Bn Devonshire Regiment. On completion of this attachment the battalion marched to billets at Busnettes near Gonnehem and then on 7 April to Béthune, where it came under 33rd Division for further training. A and B Companies went into the trenches alongside 20th Royal Fusiliers (1st Public Schools), and next day C and D joined them as 17th Sherwoods took over full responsibility for the trenches in the Auchy Right sector under of 98th Bde. It suffered a number of casualties during this first tour of duty, which ended on 14 April. The battalion received a good report from the commander of 98th Bde, who described the men as 'good material' but 'slow thinkers'. The battalions each supplied detachments to form 117th Bde Light Trench Mortar Battery (TMB) on 15 April (and also to 117th Bde Machine Gun Company when that arrived on 18 May). 39th Division now took over its own sector at Festubert, and 17th Sherwoods moved into divisional reserve at Hingette and later at Le Touret. Here it provided working parties for the Royal Engineers (REs), including 181st Tunnelling Company. From 27 April the battalion began a routine of spells in the line at Festubert and Givenchy, alternating with spells in support or in billets at Hingette or Gorre, when working parties were constantly required. The battalion usually rotated with 16th RB. There was a trickle of casualties both in the line and among working parties from shellfire and occasional bombing exchanges with the enemy. The defences at Festubert comprised a series of 'islands' in the waterlogged countryside, but mining was possible at Givenchy, and on 21 May, just after 17th Sherwoods relieved 16th RB, the enemy blew a mine in front of D Company's positions followed by a heavy bombardment with mortars and rifle grenades; the company suffered a number of casualties. By 25 May the battalion had lost 7 killed and 29 wounded in a five-day tour of front line duty. On 14 June Lt-Col Hales returned to England and Maj Herbert Milward from 16th Sherwoods was promoted to succeed him in command of 17th Sherwoods.

On the night of 3/4 July 2 officers and 48 other ranks (ORs) of 17th Sherwoods carried out a trench raid in conjunction with a much bigger raid by 16th RB on the 'Pope's Nose' position. The Sherwoods' raiders left 'No 3 Island' at 00.15 and 20 yards (18 m) from the enemy barbed wire they ran into a German party lying out in No man's land. The raiders drove them back with bombs, and cut their way through the wire, which the artillery had only partly cut. This part of the German line was strongly held and the raiders came under heavy rifle and machine gun fire. Nevertheless about 12 men got into the German trench and bombed their way along it. They withdrew at 01.10 under cover of the support party, then the whole group stayed out in No man's land with a Lewis gun for another 40 minutes to cover the flank of 16th RB's raiders. One man was killed and 1 missing, and 1 officer and 11 ORs were wounded. 16th RB's attack was costly and did not produce the results expected. Two nights later 17th Sherwoods was heavily shelled when the Germans retaliated against a raid by a neighbouring battalion. Early on 12 July 17th Sherwoods provided a smoke barrage to assist a raid by 16th Sherwoods and 17th KRRC; the smoke successfully attracted some of the retaliatory fire away from the raid. On 14 July the battalion went into reserve at Richebourg St Vaast. Since its arrival on the Western Front, counting 34 days in the front line, the battalion had lost 1 officer and 30 ORs killed, 4 officer and 95 ORs wounded. Apart from carrying out a small raid on 19 July, the battalion remained at Richebourg St Vaast in Brigade support or billets around Les Choquaux until it did another tour in the Givenchy lines from 26 July, carrying out another costly (68 casualties) raid against the 'Duck's Bill Craters' on 31 July/1 August. Finally on 6 August it went back for training at Essars.

=== Ancre ===
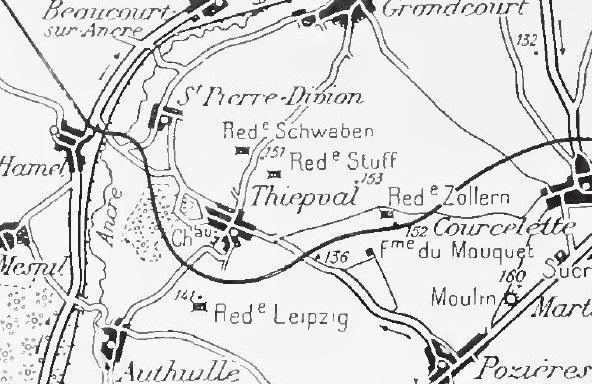
The Ancre Heights in 1916.

The increased intensity of raiding was to divert attention from Battle of the Somme, which had been going on since 1 July. On 11 August 39th Division was ordered south to join in the offensive. First 117th Bde went to La Thieuloye for brigade training, then on 24 August 17th Sherwoods entrained for Doullens where it carried out further training at Vauchelles-lès-Authie and Bertrancourt while 39th Division awaited orders from Reserve Army to go up to the front. Reserve Army began a series of minor operations along the River Ancre in early September. On 3 September 39th Division was ordered to secure a few hundred yards of high ground north-west of St Pierre-Divion, to cover the flank of 49th (West Riding) Division advancing up the river valley. 117th Brigade attacked at 05.10 with 17th Sherwoods (left) and 16th RB (right) leading, 17th KRRC in support, 16th Sherwoods in reserve, mainly as carrying parties. 17th Sherwoods went in with a 'trench strength' of 19 officers and 650 ORs, the remaining details being left at Bertrancourt. A, B and C Companies formed the first three waves, tasked with taking the German 1st, 2nd and 3rd lines respectively, while a platoon of D Company formed a flank guard for each wave. The leading waves of 117th Bde left 'Gordon Trench', formed up in No man's land and set off behind the Creeping barrage in good order. Unfortunately, the barrage had little effect on the enemy, and as soon as it lifted off the first line they manned the parapet and threw grenades as the first wave attackers closed in. At 06.00 a message arrived at Battalion headquarters (HQ) to say that A Company was in the German front trench, but 10 minutes later HQ learned that the 2nd Line trench was strongly held and that reinforcements were urgently required. In fact the whole attack had broken down by 05.40. 17th Sherwoods had been held up by uncut wire and machine gun fire from the front and flank, while the Germans brought down a heavy barrage on No man's land and their own front line. Only one officer and about 20 men of 17th Sherwoods actually entered the German front trench. Most of the brigade's surviving attackers retired to their own trenches and the remaining small parties in the German front trench were bombed out. 49th (WR) Division's attack had also failed, so at 11.50 39th Division called off any further attacks. The survivors of 17th Sherwoods were collected in 'Gordon Trench'. The battalion's casualties were extremely heavy: 5 officers and 59 ORs killed or died of wounds, 7 officers and 155 ORs wounded, 3 officers and 221 ORs missing. After spending the night in Mailly Wood, the battalion returned to Bertrancourt, where it received a draft of 70 reinforcements from 11th Sherwood Foresters, and another 362 between 8 and 11 September.

=== Schwaben Redoubt ===
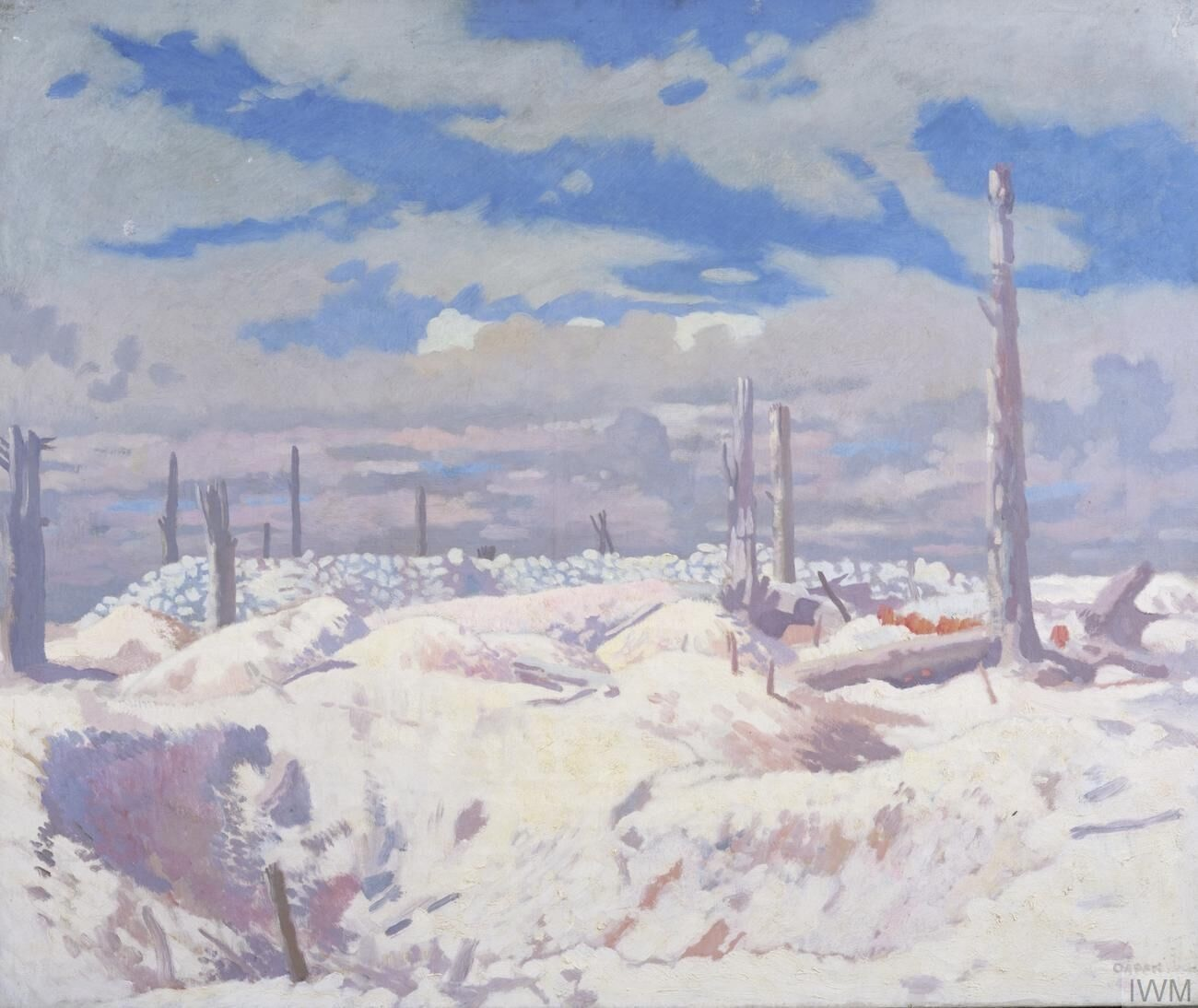
Schwaben Redoubt by William Orpen.

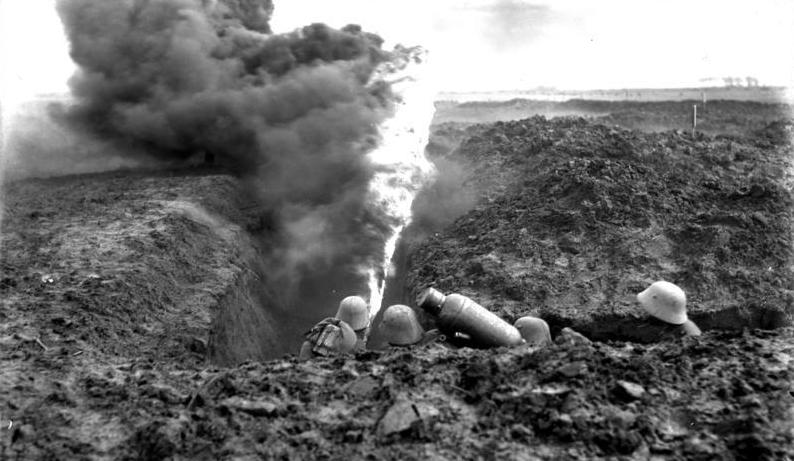
German flamethrower troops in training.

After its crippling casualties the battalion required time for reorganisation, and did not go back into the trenches until 12 September when it relieved 16th Sherwoods and took over a two-company frontage. On 15 September it took part in a demonstration with rifle and Lewis gun fire while the Battle of Flers–Courcelette was launched by Reserve Army and Fourth Army further south. On 20 September it moved to the trenches in front of Serre, which it held until the end of the month under occasional bombardments. It then returned to Bertrancourt and was billeted in Hédauville. 39th Division entered the Battle of the Ancre Heights on 5 October and 17th Sherwoods took over trenches in the Thiepval sector, with A Company in the front line, D designated as counter-attack company, B as support and C as reserve. Just after 18.00 on 7 October the artillery fire on both sides became violent as the enemy attempted to recover the southern edge of the 'Schwaben Redoubt' held by the 16th Sherwoods to the battalion's left. This attack was held off, but at 05.30 next day 17th Sherwoods' left flank was driven in by a bombing party accompanied by flammenwerfers (flamethrowers) and heavy shelling on Thiepval. Eventually 16th and 17th Sherwoods were able to drive off this attack, 17th Sherwoods taking a number of prisoners for little loss. The two battalions were congratulated by the brigadier and the corps commander. At 04.30 on 9 October, before dawn, a platoon of 17th Sherwoods assisted an attempt by 16th Sherwoods to capture the rest of the Schwaben Redoubt by a surprise attack without artillery preparation. The platoon succeeded in taking its objective, 'Point 99', but was later driven back by weight of bombs and the fact that 16th Sherwoods' attack had failed. 17th Sherwoods went back to huts in Martinsart Wood next day, having lost 29 ORs killed, 1 officer and 72 ORs wounded and 1 OR missing in a 5-day period. It remained there until 16 October while 118th Bde and 17th KRRC succeeded in completing the capture of the Schwaben Redoubt. 17th Sherwoods returned to the line in the Thiepval (River Ancre) sector, where its outposts were raided early on 20 October. That night the battalion went back into brigade support, leaving 4 Lewis gun teams to help 17th KRRC garrison the Schwaben Redoubt. Next day 117th Bde carried out a subsidiary attack to assist 116th Bde's capture of 'Stuff Trench': 17th Sherwoods supplied carrying parties while A Company joined in the attack on Points 16 and 38 south of the Ancre, supported by 117th TMB. The company's bombing squads rushed Point 16, took some prisoners and set up a block, but were driven back from Point 38 by shrapnel fire. One OR was killed and 7 missing, while 3 officers and 12 ORs were wounded in this minor operation. 17th Sherwoods continued holding the trenches in the Ancre valley, with occasional bombing attacks, until it went into billets at Senlis on 29/30 October, where it was joined by a draft of 44 reinforcements.

The battalion did short spells in the trenches in early November. On 13 November Reserve Army (now renamed Fifth Army) launched a new offensive (the Battle of the Ancre). At 05.45 118th Bde was to attack up the Ancre against St Pierre-Divion, which had thwarted 39th Division in September. Then at 06.15 16th Sherwoods supported by a tank were to carry out a subsidiary attack alongside. 17th Sherwoods was in divisional reserve, tasked with providing guides, runners, stretcher-bearers and liaison parties with the tanks. The battalion assembled in 'Paisley Avenue' at 04.50. At 06.55 A Company moved up to support 16th Sherwoods, later followed by the other companies. 16th Sherwoods had successfully taken its objective and gone on to St Pierre-Divion itself. The companies of 17th Sherwoods were sent up to clear dugouts and deal with the hundreds of prisoners. 39th Division was relieved the following day and went back to Warloy where 17th Sherwoods' camp was bombed by enemy aircraft during the night with some casualties. The division then began a journey north by road and rail to Saint-Omer to join Second Army. 17th Sherwoods was billeted in Tatinghem and attached to Second Army Central School, with working parties at the various specialist schools (artillery, sniping, mortar and grenade) while the battalion officers, NCOs and Lewis gunners attended courses.

=== Winter 1916–17 ===
On 22 December 17th Sherwoods rejoined 39th Division, now stationed in the Ypres Salient. The battalion went up to the Canal Bank sector and became brigade reserve. From 26 December it began alternating with 16th Sherwoods and 16th RB in the Wieltje or 'Railway Wood' trenches, in support at 'Lancashire Farm', and in reserve at Brielen or 'C Camp'. On 14 February, a normal day in the trenches, Lt-Col Milward was wounded and Maj Noel Houghton came from 16th Sherwoods to take over temporary command of the battalion.

From 16 to 26 February 17th Sherwoods went to Vox Vrie Farm for training, then into trenches at Hooge, alternating with support in Ypres Barracks and reserve at 'St Lawrence Camp' or 'Montreal Camp'. In mid- April the battalion went by rail to the Bollezeele training area, where it learned the new platoon offensive tactics. On 27 April it returned to the camps round Poperinge, behind Ypres, where it underwent further specialist training until 15 May when it went into the 'Hill Top' sector near Ypres. On 18 May the battalion suffered some casualties when it received an intense though inaccurate enemy bombardment, apparently to cover a raid on a neighbouring division. When not it the line it was in support at Canal Bank or in reserve at 'O Camp', where it supplied large working parties to the REs or the Royal Garrison Artillery (RGA). On 1 June Q Special Company, RE, carried out a gas attack from 17th Sherwoods' positions, using Livens Projectors to drench the enemy line with 500 drums of a new gas weapon. 17th Sherwoods together with the whole of the neighbouring 116th Bde had to take special anti-gas precautions. The attack was apparently successful. Lieutenant-Col Milward returned to the battalion on 10 June and Maj Houghton went back to 16th Sherwoods, succeeding to the command of that battalion a few weeks later.

The routine of trench duty, patrolling No man's land, and working parties continued until 1 July, when the battalion went by rail to Moulle where 39th Division underwent special training over model trenches for the forthcoming Ypres Offensive. Emphasis was given to methods for overcoming the new concrete 'pillboxes' the Germans were constructing. 17th Sherwoods returned to the front line at Hill Top and Canal Bank on 29 July.

=== Pilckem Ridge ===
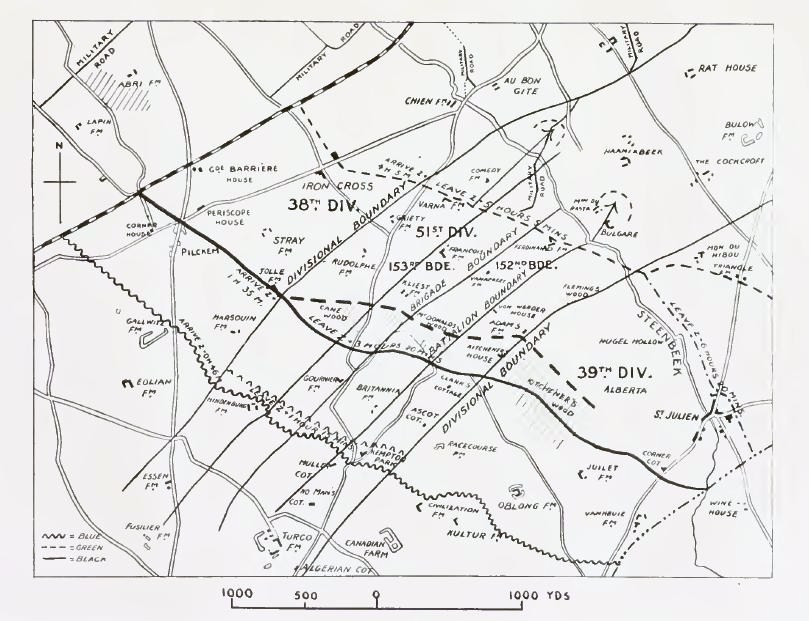
The northern part of the Battle of Pilckem Ridge, 31 July 1917.

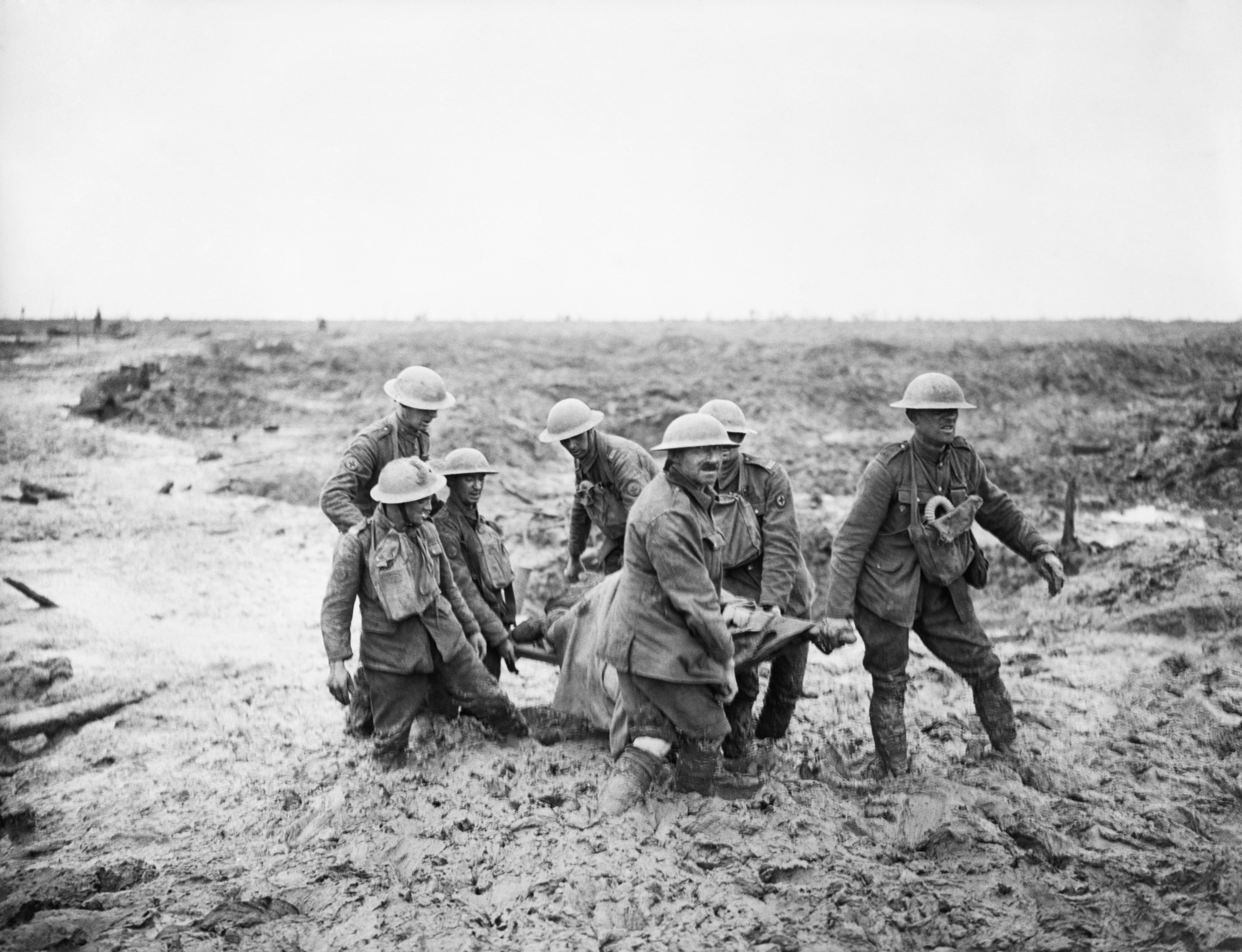
Stretcher-bearers struggle through the mud after the Battle of Pilckem Ridge, 1 August 1917 (Photograph by John Warwick Brooke).

The Ypres offensive opened with the Battle of Pilckem Ridge on 31 July 1917 after 12 days' bombardment of the German positions. 117th Brigade's plan was for 16th Sherwoods (right) and 17th KRRC (left) to lead the attack, capturing four successive lines, the whole being referred to as the 'German Front Line System' constituting the division's first objective for the day. When these battalions were on the 'Blue Dotted Line', 17th Sherwoods and 16th RB would pass through with some tanks of 21st Company, G Battalion, Tank Corp, to capture 'Kitchener's Wood' and the German defences up to the Steenbeek stream (the second divisional objective). 118th Brigade would then pass through in turn to secure the division's final set of objectives. It was already raining when 17th Sherwoods completed its assembly in the Hill Top trenches at 01.15, ready for Zero at 03.50, about half an hour before dawn. At Zero minus 5 minutes 500 oil drums were projected onto the German front line by Livens mortars (the resulting fires helped the attackers keep direction), and at Zero the British barrage of artillery and machine gun fire came down and the assault troops moved out. They met little resistance in the German front and support trenches, which were only lightly held. Soon 16th Sherwoods had settled down to consolidate the Dotted Blue Line while 17th Sherwoods came up with tank G47 'Gitana' (G45 had ditched in the German front line). 17th Sherwoods had got across No man's land before the German counter-barrage came down and met no opposition reaching the Blue Line. When the creeping barrage moved off again at 05.15 the battalion followed, led by A and C Companies (each in two waves), with B and D about 100 yards (91 m) behind. The advance only met slight opposition from two machine guns near 'Oblong Farm', which were dealt with by rifle and Lewis gun fire. Machine gunners and snipers in 'Canoe Trench' on the Back Line caused a slight holdup, but the leading companies followed their training and sent Lewis gun teams out to the flanks to suppress them. The second wave then advanced through Kitchener's Wood with tank G47 to the Dotted Black Line. Here they were confronted by machine gun fire from the strongpoint at 'Alberta', which were dealt with by Lewis guns and rifle grenadiers, and trench mortars of 117th TMB. Tank G47 did particularly good work, twice driving round three sides of Alberta to silence machine guns. The defenders were driven into their concrete dugout and the riflemen worked round them and forced their surrender. By this stage the battalion had already taken 120 prisoners, 4 machine guns and an anti-tank gun. At 06.50 B and D Companies formed up behind their barrage, which moved off at 07.30. Again, very little opposition was encountered except for the strongpoint at 'Hugel Hollow' which was the particular objective of one platoon from B Company. Another 137 prisoners and 3 machine guns were taken from Hugel Hollow and the pillboxes north of Alberta. At 07.55 the battalion reached the banks of the Steenbeek (the Dotted Green Line) and began consolidating on the far side of it. Here it came under fire from Germans lining the ridge beyond. 118th Brigade passed through at 10.15 to complete the advance, but at this point the plan began to break down. 118th Brigade only managed to advance about 250 yards (230 m), and about an hour later began to fall back before fierce counter-attacks. Lewis gun fire from 17th Sherwoods and protective artillery barrages stopped the Germans about 300 yards (270 m) in front of the Steenbeek, which became the British front line. During the afternoon and evening two companies of 16th Sherwoods were sent up to reinforce 17th Sherwoods and survivors of 118th Bde holding this line. Under incessant rain, the Steenbeek valley became a morass, and simply maintaining positions was an ordeal. 117th Brigade was supposed to have been relieved on the night of 31 July/1 August, but 118th Bde had been much harder hit, and 117th remained in position. The following night the brigade took over the whole divisional frontage, and held it for three more days. The battalion was finally relieved during the night of 4/5 August and went back to Canal Bank. 17th Sherwoods' casualties over the five days came to 2 officers and 46 ORs killed or died of wounds, 5 officers (including the Wesleyan Chaplain) and 206 ORs wounded, 12 ORs missing, and another 48 ORs evacuated to hospital for other causes, such as shell shock and gassing. The battalion's adjutant, Captain T. Thornton, was also wounded but remained on duty; he was later awarded the Distinguished Service Order (DSO).

The battalion rested and cleaned up (its clothing was 'in a sorry state', according to the War Diary) and then on 7 August went by rail and motor buses to Le Roukloshille, near Méteren, where it continued reorganising and training. On 13 August it returned by bus to 'Ridge Wood' and next day went into the support line in the Klein Zillebeke sector, occupying captured German dugouts in and around Ravine Wood. On 17 August it relieved 16th Sherwoods in the front line but played no part in the Battle of Langemarck (16–18 August). After it was relieved and went back to Bois Confluent in support it was constantly providing working parties in the front line. On 4 September it marched to Steenvoorde to begin training for the next operation, the Battle of the Menin Road Ridge. On 12 September 17th Sherwoods went up by bus and took over the trenches in 'Shrewsbury Forest' for a short tour of duty. The next day Lt-Col Houghton of 16th Sherwoods was killed by a shell and Maj John Webster was sent from 17th Sherwoods to take over command.

=== Menin Road ===
17th Sherwoods returned to Shrewsbury Forest on the night of 18/19 September with three companies taking up their positions for the Menin Road attack, which was scheduled for 20 September; one company remaining in 'Larch Wood' in support. The battalion suffered considerable casualties from shellfire while moving into position. On 02.40 on 20 September the battalion silently assembled along tapes laid in No man's land, without incurring any casualties. The plan was for 117th Bde to advance through Shrewsbury Forest and form part of a defensive flank for the rest of the attack. It was to be led by 17th Sherwoods (right) and 16th RB (left) to capture the Red Line, then 16th Sherwoods and 17th KRRC would pass through to take the Blue Line. Screened by a very heavy barrage advancing by 50 yards (46 m) every 2 minutes, the assaulting troops jumped off at Zero (05.40). The enemy counter-barrage came down quickly, causing considerable casualties. In order to get away from this fire 16th Sherwoods pushed forwards, getting mixed up with the 17th Sherwoods ahead. The division to the left got held up, and fire from that flank caused heavy casualties to the two left-hand battalions of 117th Bde (16th RB and 17th KRRC), but the two battalions of Sherwoods advanced steadily over soft ground. Opposition was first met from Germans lying up in shellholes between 'Jules Farm' and 'Bulgar Wood', and snipers in 'Jordan Trench'; these were dealt with by Lewis gun fire. Moving on, the right company of 17th Sherwoods was held up by fire from dugouts at 'Welbeck Grange', but these were overcome with rifle grenades and Lewis guns. Similarly the dugouts in the north-west corner of Bulgar Wood put up resistance and but these were captured by the left and centre companies. The support company reached its objective 16 minutes after Zero and began consolidating. The assaulting companies reached the Red Line at Zero + 28 minutes. When 16th Sherwoods had passed through and moved towards the Blue Line, 17th Sherwoods' support company noticed parties retiring up the ridge in front and brought overhead Lewis gun fire to bear on them. The right company was taking casualties from a pillbox on the Blue Line known as 'Chatsworth Castle', until it was captured by 16th Sherwoods, and the support company sent up a platoon at 07.45 to reinforce the right company. At 11.15 17th Sherwoods' centre company (C Company) was sent up to provide close support to 16th Sherwoods consolidating on the Blue Line. At 17.10 the commander of C Company saw the enemy concentrating on the ridge for a counter-attack. He reported this to 16th Sherwoods and then took a Lewis gun team to bring fire to bear. With the combined fire of 16th Sherwoods and the artillery, the attack was broken up. Another concentration at 07.20 was broken up after the SOS signal went up to call down a protective barrage and C Company moved into 16th Sherwoods' line to reinforce them. By the end of the day the three forward companies of 17th Sherwoods had captured around 120 prisoners and two machine guns. The battalion held its support position throughout 22 September and was relieved that night to go back to 'Brook Camp'. Its total casualties in the two-day battle were 3 officers and 19 ORs killed or died of wounds, 2 officers and 122 ORs wounded, and 19 missing. Captain J.W. Miller (and Maj Webster serving with 16th Sherwoods) were awarded the DSO. 39th Division attacked again on 26 September (the Battle of Polygon Wood) but 117th Bde was in divisional reserve in Ridge Wood and 17th Sherwoods was not engaged except for 100 men attached to 116th and 118th Bdes as additional stretcher bearers. At 20.00 the battalion moved up into support behind 116th Bde in the 'Tower Hamlets' sector. Next day the battalion helped with consolidation, coming under shellfire, but that night it was relieved and went by bus to 'Locrehof Farm'. It remained resting and training there and at 'Vyverbeek Camp' until 19 October. It then returned to the support lines at Tower Hamlets, where working parties helped to bury signal cables. 117th Brigade was relieved on 24/25 October and 17th Sherwoods boarded buses at 'Shrapnel Corner' and went back first to Vyverbeek Camp and then No 2 Camp at Vierstraat. The battalion moved to 'Chippewa Camp' on 5 November before taking over the waterlogged front line trenches at Tower Hamlets. Apart from a gas projector attack mounted by the REs (for which the front line was temporarily evacuated as a safety precaution) the tour of duty was quiet and the battalion was not engaged in the Second Battle of Passchendaele that ended the Ypres offensive.

=== Winter 1917–18 ===
For most of November the battalion alternated between the front line at 'Bodmin Copse' near Polderhoek, the support line at 'Canada Tunnels', and Chippewa Camp in the rear. On 23 November Lt-Col Milward left 17th Sherwoods to take over command of the Regular 2nd Sherwoods; on 19 December Lt-Col James Methuen arrived to take over 17th Sherwoods. He had previously commanded 17th KRRC in 117th Bde until he was wounded earlier in the year. From 26 November to 9 December 17th Sherwoods was based at 'English Farm' providing working parties for the RGA, then it went by train to Lottinghen near Boulogne for training. It did not return to the line until 29 December, when it went into support in the Alberta sector in the Steenbeek valley. It then alternated between there and the Corps Line on Langemarck Ridge when it was in support, and 'Siege Camp' or 'Irish Farm' when in reserve. This lasted until 25 January 1918 when it went by train to the Somme, where 39th Division joined Fifth Army. 17th Sherwoods was billeted at Suzanne and then did a quiet tour of duty in the line at Gouzeaucourt from 30 January to 4 February. It finally went back to Hendecourt.

== Disbandment ==
Because of the severe manpower shortage being suffered by the BEF in early 1918, infantry brigades were reduced to three battalions and the surplus war-formed battalions disbanded to provide reinforcements to the others. In 117th Bde the plan had been to disband 16th Sherwoods, but in the event 17th Sherwoods were chosen instead. The battalion got the news on 4 January. Its last task was to dig a new trench on the night of 5/6 February, which was dubbed 'Methuen Trench'. Next day a draft of 4 officers and 100 ORs from 17th Sherwoods went to the 15th Sherwoods (Nottingham) in 35th Division. A further 9 officers and 200 ORs were drafted to 16th Sherwoods in 117th Bde on 8 February (16th Sherwoods' A Company was disbanded and replaced by one formed from 17th Sherwoods). Small numbers went to the 2/5th, 2/6th, 2/7th, 9th and 10th Sherwoods. On 21 February the remainder of the battalion went to form part of 17th Entrenching Battalion, composed of men from the disbanded battalions of 39th and 30th Divisions, mainly from the Hampshire Regiment and Manchester Regiment. Entrenching battalions were temporary units used for labour duties until the men were required for drafting to service battalions.<re name = TrailSF/>

== Insignia ==
The battalion wore the Sherwood Foresters' cap badge and the 'NOTTS AND DERBY' brass title on the shoulder straps. From November 1915 units of 117th Bde also wore green flashes with a black symbol on both sleeves: in 17th Sherwoods this was a green half-oval with a black square diamond superimposed. On 1 September 1917 the diamond was changed to brown to match the Sherwood Foresters' traditional colours. The formation sign for 39th Division was a white square with three light blue vertical stripes.

For the attack on Pilckem Ridge the platoons wore coloured ribbons on their shoulders relating to their tasks: black and white on the left shoulder for those going forward to the Black Line, black only for those going on to the Dotted Black Line, green on the left shoulder for the Dotted Green Line platoons, on the right shoulder for the strongpoint platoons.

== Memorials ==
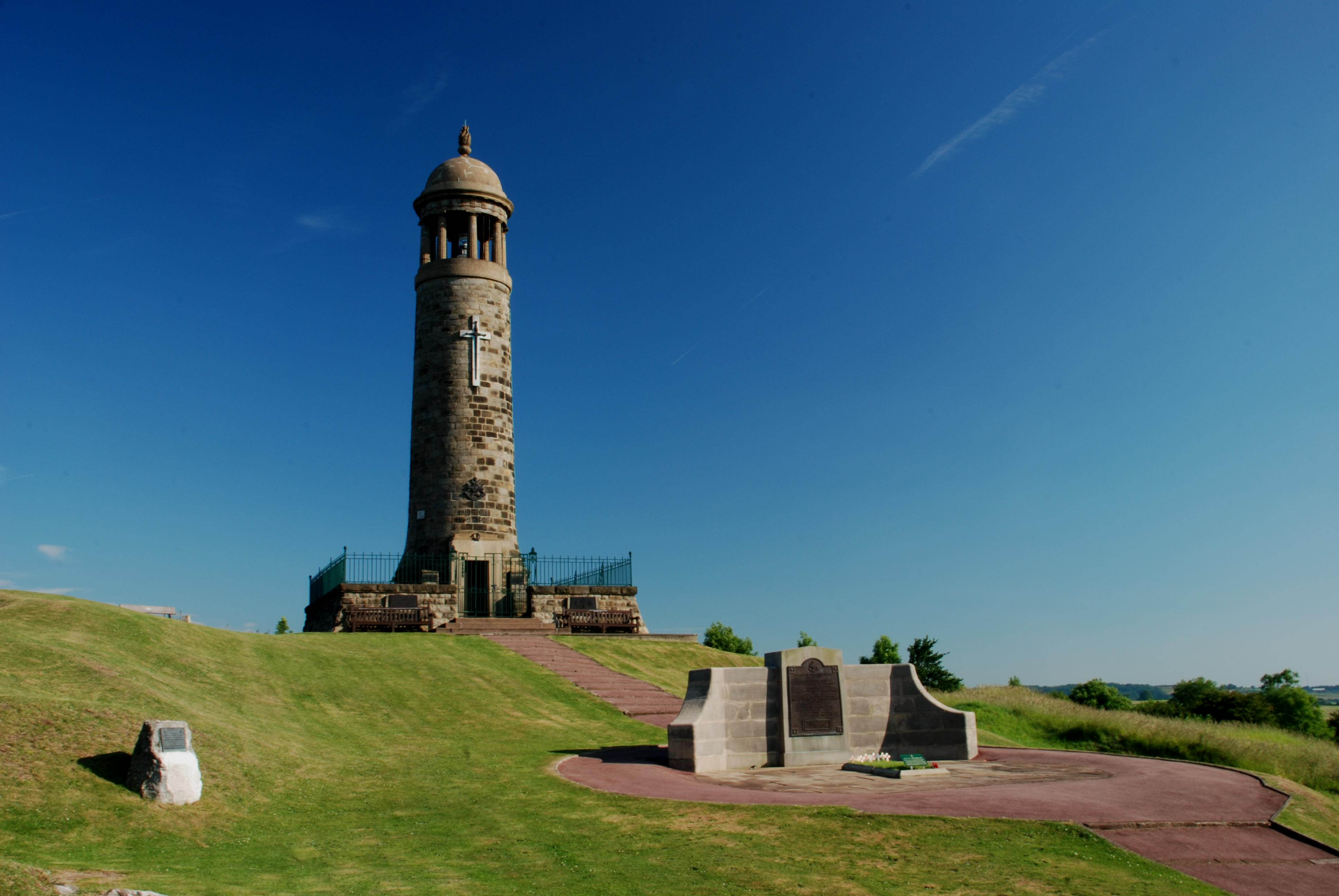
The Sherwood Foresters' memorial at Crich Stand

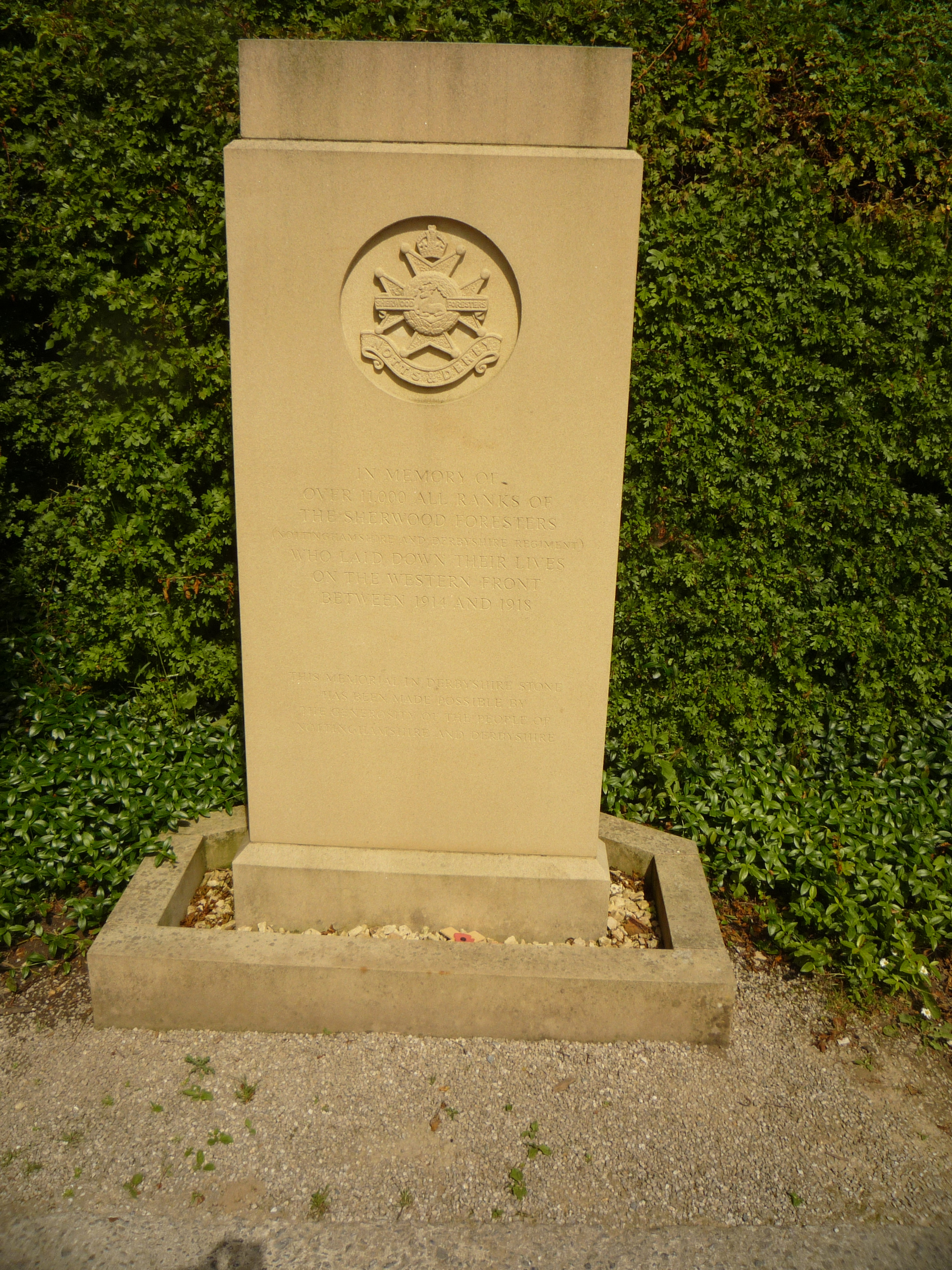
The Sherwood Foresters' memorial at Tyne Cot

There is a memorial sundial to the men of 17th Sherwoods in the grounds of Nottingham Castle, which was dedicated in 1930.

The Sherwood Foresters' regimental war memorial, Crich Stand, consists of a tower topped by a lantern erected in 1923 on a hilltop overlooking the village of Crich close to the Nottinghamshire–Derbyshire boundary. Bronze memorial plaques referring to the monument on Crich Hill were later placed in several towns and villages in the two counties.

A modern Derbyshire stone memorial to those of the Sherwood Foresters who died on the Western Front was erected behind the Commonwealth War Graves Commission's Tyne Cot Monument in 2009.
