= General Capper =

General Capper may refer to:

- John Capper (1861–1955), British Army major general
- Thompson Capper (1863–1915), British Army major general
