= Montague Hornby =

British Army brigadier-general

Brigadier-General Montague Hornby CB CMG DSO
- Born: 23 July 1869
- Died: 21 November 1948 (aged 79)
- Military career
- Allegiance: United Kingdom
- Branch: British Army
- Service years: 1889–1927
- Rank: Brigadier-General
- Unit: Indian Staff Corps
- Commands: 8th Battalion, York and Lancaster Regiment; 116th Infantry Brigade; 39th Division; 137th Infantry Brigade
- Conflicts: Operations in Waziristan (WIA); Tirah campaign; Nandi campaign; First World War; Western Front; German spring offensive (WIA)
- Awards: Companion of the Order of the Bath; Companion of the Order of St Michael and St George; Distinguished Service Order

Brigadier-General Montague Leyland Hornby CB CMG DSO (23 July 1869 – 21 November 1948) was a senior British Indian Army officer who was briefly General Officer Commanding 39th Division during the First World War.

== Military career ==
Montague Leyland Hornby, born in July 1869, was educated at Shrewsbury School before entering the Royal Military College Sandhurst. He was commissioned into the East Lancashire Regiment of the British Army in January 1889, before transferring to the Indian Staff Corps in March 1892. He took part in operations in Waziristan between 1894 and 1895, being severely wounded in action at Wana and appointed a Companion of the Distinguished Service Order in the latter year. Between 1897 and 1898 Hornby served in the Tirah campaign, after which he joined the King's African Rifles, serving in East Africa. He saw action against the Nandi Resistance in 1900. Hornby retired from the Indian Army in 1909.

Hornby returned to military service with the British Army at the start of the First World War in 1914. Into the following year he served as brigade major of the 70th Infantry Brigade before he took command of the 8th Battalion, York and Lancaster Regiment. Hornby continued with the battalion until April 1916 when he was appointed to command the 116th Infantry Brigade, during which service he was appointed a Companion of the Order of St Michael and St George in 1917. When Brigadier-General George Cape, the acting commander of Hornby's division, the 39th Division, was killed in action on 18 March 1918, Hornby took temporary command. Major-General Edward Feetham resumed his command on 23 March, and Hornby returned to the 116th Brigade.

With the German spring offensive ongoing, Feetham ordered a withdrawal on the same day, requiring the division to cross the river at Halle. While doing so the units were attacked by German planes and artillery, severely wounding Hornby. He was promoted on 3 June 1918 to brevet colonel. After recuperating he returned to his brigade in October before in November moving to command the 137th Infantry Brigade. Hornby continued in the army after the end of the war, being created a Companion of the Order of the Bath in 1922 prior to his final retirement in 1927.

In 1931, Hornby published a pamphlet laying out a scheme to encourage British city dwellers to emigrate to Canada and take up farming. He traversed Canada through the 1930s and early 1940s promoting his scheme and getting local support. In 1931, Prince George's city council said that the time was not ripe, and too many questions were not answered, especially how the plan was to be funded without cost to the local district. But the Board of Trade endorsed the plan in principle in December 1933 and over the next few years the idea was kept alive. To the west of Prince George, Smithers' Board of Trade endorsed the plan in December 1936. General Hornby’s letter to British members of parliament was published in the Prince George Citizen July 1937. The following year, Hornby’s plan brought British Cabinet minister Sir Henry Croft to Prince George, scouting possible sites. The Citizen’s page one headline read "10,000 Settlers with $25 Millions". In 1939, seven British Columbia interior Members of the Legislative Assembly endorsed the Hornby plan, sending Premier Duff Pattullo to Ottawa supporting 36,000 acres to be set aside in the Salmon River Valley north of Prince George. Other potential settlements were suggested in Vanderhoof, Smithers, the Cariboo, Lillooet and the Windermere Valley. The Citizen editorialized its support for "A Comprehensive Land Policy" on February 8, 1940, noting that Hornby had just persuaded the Board of Trade in Saint John, New Brunswick to support the scheme of assisted immigration. The Prince George paper said several Canadian provinces "have felt the impact of the enthusiasm of this grand old man, who spends his life and energies in arousing Canadians to a realization of their responsibilities as trustees of vast areas of fertile lands that should be populated and brought into productive use.

He died in November 1948. The Alaska Highway News in Fort St. John lamented his death and stated that, if Hornby's schemes had come to fruition, many Britishers from industrial cities might have taken part in "a mass migration of farm workers" to Canada.
