= Staffordshire Brigade =

Staffordshire Brigade 137th (Staffordshire) Brigade
- Active: 1888–1936
- Country: United Kingdom
- Branch: Territorial Army
- Type: Infantry
- Size: Brigade
- Part of: 46th (North Midland) Division
- Engagements: Hohenzollern Redoubt; Gommecourt; Battle of the St Quentin Canal; Hundred Days Offensive

Commanders
- Notable commanders: Brig-Gen J.V. Campbell, VC

The Staffordshire Brigade (later 137th Brigade) was a volunteer infantry brigade formation of the British Army from 1888 to 1936. It saw active service on the Western Front in World War I, including the attacks on the Hohenzollern Redoubt and the Gommecourt Salient, and the assault crossing of the St Quentin Canal, 'a most remarkable feat of arms'.

== Origins ==
The Staffordshire Brigade had its origin in the Stanhope Memorandum of 1888. This proposed a Mobilisation Scheme for units of the Volunteer Force, which would assemble by brigades at key points in case of war. In peacetime the brigades provided a structure for collective training. Under this scheme the Volunteer Battalions of the South Staffordshire Regiment and the Prince of Wales's (North Staffordshire Regiment) would assemble at Wolverhampton. The brigade commander and his Aide-de-Camp were retired Regular officers on the Reserve list, while the other staff were Volunteer officers drawn from the constituent battalions. The Staffordshire Brigade was organised as follows:

- Brigade Headquarters at Wolverhampton, later at The Friary, Lichfield
- 1st Volunteer Battalion, South Staffordshire Regiment at Handsworth
- 2nd Volunteer Battalion, South Staffordshire Regiment at Walsall
- 3rd Volunteer Battalion, South Staffordshire Regiment at Wolverhampton
- 1st Volunteer Battalion, North Staffordshire Regiment at Stoke-on-Trent
- 2nd Volunteer Battalion, North Staffordshire Regiment at Burton-upon-Trent
- Supply Detachment, later designated an Army Service Corps Company
- Bearer Company, later part of the Royal Army Medical Corps

The brigade formed part of Northern Command, and was commanded by the following officers:

- Colonel (Hon Maj-Gen) Frederick Edward Sotheby, a retired former officer in the Rifle Brigade, was appointed Brigade Commander on 11 July 1888. He had seen active service in the Crimea, Indian Mutiny, China War and Ashanti War.
- Col Hon Francis Bridgeman, MP, retired former officer in the Scots Guards, appointed 17 Aug 1892.
- Charles Pierrepont, Viscount Newark (later 4th Earl of Manvers), a former officer in the Grenadier Guards and later Major in the 4th VB of the Sherwood Foresters, was appointed on 15 January 1899, and reappointed on the reorganisation of the brigades in 1906.

== Territorial Force ==
Under the Haldane Reforms, the former Volunteers were subsumed into the Territorial Force (TF) in 1908. The 1st VB of the South Staffordshires was converted into the North Midland Divisional Engineers, the remainder of the brigade were renumbered 5th and 6th battalions in sequence after the Regular and Special Reserve battalions of their parent regiments. The Staffordshire Brigade was assigned to the North Midland Division of the TF.

== World War I ==
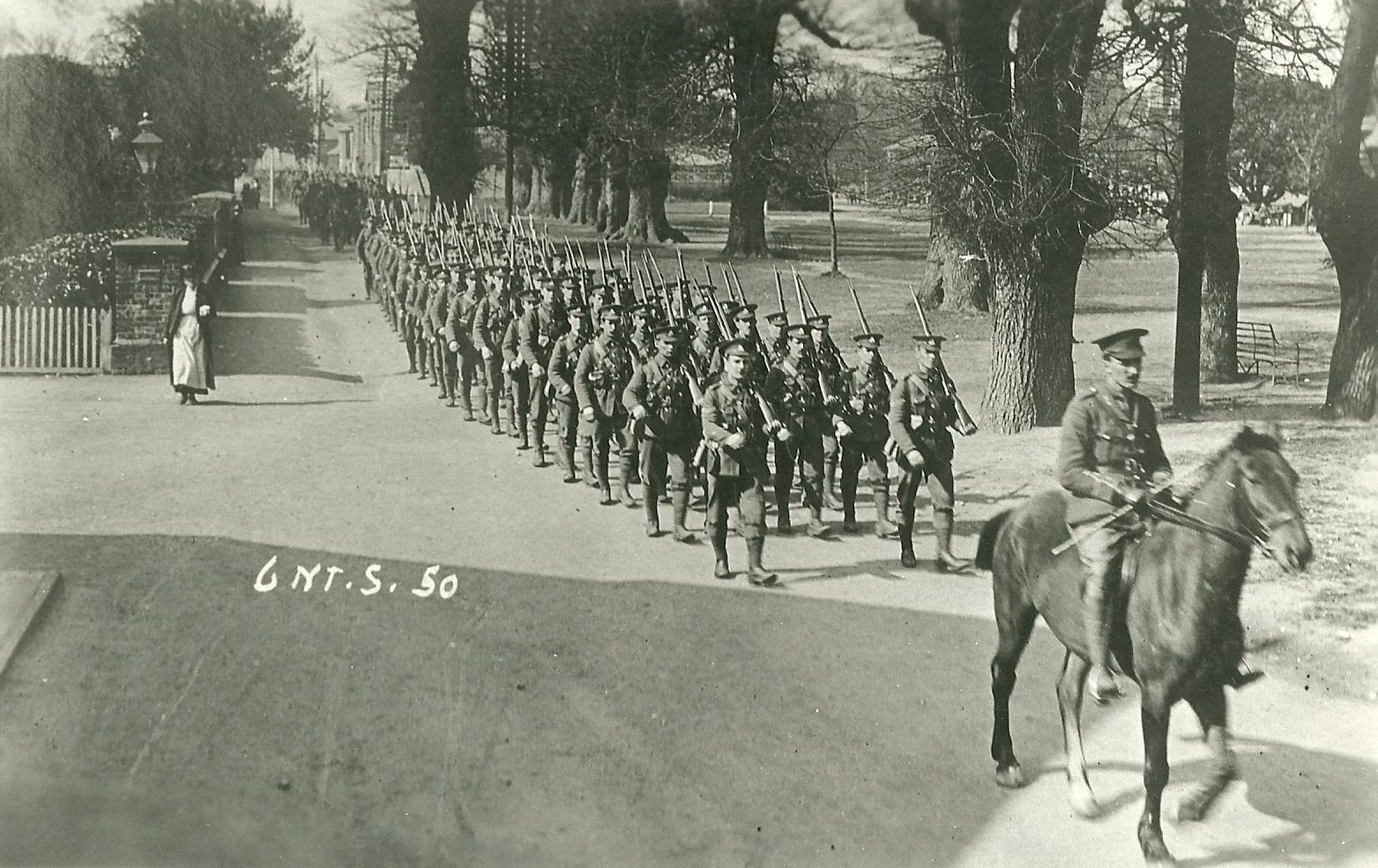
Men of the 6th Battalion, North Staffordshire Regiment, in Harpenden, 1914.

On the outbreak of World War I, the North Midland Division mobilised immediately, and soon afterwards the men were invited to volunteer for foreign service. This was accepted by the majority, and the division moved to Luton to train for deployment overseas. It began landing in France in late February 1915 and by 8 March had completed its concentration – the first complete TF formation to arrive on the Western Front. Shortly afterwards the TF formations were numbered, the North Midland Division becoming the 46th (North Midland) Division, and the Staffordshire Brigade was designated 137th (Staffordshire) Brigade on 12 May 1915.

Meanwhile, duplicate or 2nd-Line TF forces were being organised in the United Kingdom from Home Service personnel and new recruits who came flooding in, with 176th (2/1st Staffordshire) Brigade forming in 59th (2nd North Midland) Division, after which the original units were distinguished by a '1/' prefix.

The 137th Brigade served on the Western Front for the whole of the war, with the exception of a few weeks in Egypt.

=== Order of Battle ===
During World War I the brigade had the following composition:

- 1/5th Battalion, South Staffordshire Regiment
- 1/6th Battalion, South Staffordshire Regiment
- 1/5th Battalion, Prince of Wales's (North Staffordshire Regiment) – broken up between 2/5th, 1/6th, 2/6th and 9th North Staffords on 29–30 March 1918
- 1/6th Battalion, Prince of Wales's (North Staffordshire Regiment)
- 4th (Extra Reserve) Battalion, King's (Liverpool Regiment) – attached from 10 November to 3 December 1915
- 1/4th Battalion, Suffolk Regiment – attached from 10 to 15 November 1915
- 1/4th Battalion, Seaforth Highlanders (Ross-shire Buffs, The Duke of Albany's) – attached from 6 to 16 November 1915
- 1/4th (City of London) Battalion, London Regiment – attached from 11 to 15 November 1915
- 137th Brigade Machine Gun Company, Machine Gun Corps – formed 7 March 1916 – joined 46th Battalion Machine Gun Corps 28 February 1918
- 423 Trench Mortar Battery – joined 2 March 1916 – became 137/1 TMB
- 137/2 Trench Mortar Battery – joined 22 April 1916
- 137th Trench Mortar Battery – 137/1 and 137/2 TMBs amalgamated 6 June 1916

=== Hohenzollern Redoubt ===
The brigade was not involved in the 46th Division's first action (the German flamethrower attack at Hooge in the Ypres Salient on 30–31 July 1915), but was in the forefront of the attack on the Hohenzollern Redoubt on 13–15 October that year. This was an attempt to restart the failed Battle of Loos, and the division was moved down from Ypres on 1 October for the purpose. The Germans recaptured the Hohenzollern trench system on 3 October, and the new attack was aimed at this point, the actual objective for 137th Brigade being to clear 'Big Willie' trench followed by 'The Dump' behind the Hohenzollern trenches. It went in at 14.00 on 13 October behind a gas cloud, two companies each of 1/5th North Staffs and 1/5th South Staffs in the lead, the other two of each battalion in the second line, followed by bombing parties to clear enemy dugouts. Things did not go according to plan: Brig-Gen Freetham found it almost impossible to deploy his troops, and they jumped off partly from Big Willie (2 companies 1/5th South Staffs) and partly from the old front line 300 yards from the rest of Big Willie.

The British bombardment had been ineffective while the German artillery brought down a barrage on the division's jumping-off trenches. The attacking battalions came under enfilade fire and lost hundreds of casualties within a few yards of their own line. Only a handful of 1/5th North Staffs got as far as Big Willie, while the attack of the 1/5th South Staffs never got going. The British attack was hurriedly called off.

=== To Egypt ===
In December 1915 the division was ordered to Egypt, and 137th Brigade arrived there by 13 January. A week later the move was countermanded and the troops re-embarked for France, concentrating near Amiens by mid-February. The only result of this move was an outbreak of infectious disease (Paratyphoid fever and Diphtheria) that weakened units and men for months to come.

=== Gommecourt ===
The 46th Division went back into the line in the Vimy sector, suffering a steady trickle of casualties over the coming months. In May, however, it began to move south to take part in the forthcoming offensive on the Somme. The division was ordered to assault the north side of the Gommecourt Salient on 1 July 1916. The operation, in conjunction with the 56th (1/1st London) Division attacking from the south, aimed at cutting off the salient, but was in fact a diversion for the main attack a few miles south that opened the Battle of the Somme.

1/6th South Staffs and 1/6th North Staffs were to form the first waves, with 1/5th South Staffs and 1/5th North Staffs supporting the attack with bombing parties and forming the rear waves setting off from the Support Line carrying heavy loads of trench equipment for consolidating the anticipated captures. But the attack was another disaster, the first wave being cut down almost on the start line. The jumping-off and communication trenches were completely inadequate, and the following waves were badly delayed, completely mixed up, and suffering casualties from German shellfire. The brigadier tried to organise a second attack by 1/5th North Staffs and 1/5th South Staffs, but after several delays they were told to 'sit tight' and abandon an attack that the Official History says 'would have been a mere waste of life'.

=== Bocquoy ===
Early 1917 saw the 46th Division still holding the line in the Gommecourt area. However, at the beginning of March, patrols found that the Germans were beginning to retreat from the Gommecourt defences. The division followed up slowly and cautiously, but on the night of 14 March an attack on Bucquoy Graben (trench) by the 1/5th North Staffs and 1/6th South Staffs led to heavy casualties. The rushed attack had been ordered by V Corps headquarters despite the protests of the divisional commander. The battalions had been on the training grounds practising for the attack when it was brought forward. Although 'the assault was gallantly pressed' (Official History) it was a complete failure, with heavy casualties.

=== Lens ===
After rest and training, 46th Division returned to the line in the coal-mining sector around Lens in April. Late in May, the division began small-scale operations against Hill 65. On 8 June, 138th Brigade attacked, with 137th Brigade providing a diversion using dummies representing an advancing battalion. 46th Division was now ordered to capture Lens itself, beginning on 28 June. The attack by 137th Brigade gained its objectives with few casualties. Another divisional attack on 1 July aimed at capturing more houses and trenches. The troops were held up in severe house-to-house fighting before a second push cleared the cellars and caused heavy casualties to the defenders. But in the afternoon a German counter-attacks drove the attackers back to their start line.

After Lens, the division was withdrawn into reserve, and did not engage in major operations again during 1917. On 29–30 January 1918 the 1/5th North Staffs was broken up to provide replacements to other North Staffs battalions, including the 1/6th Battalion in 137th Brigade.

=== St Quentin Canal ===
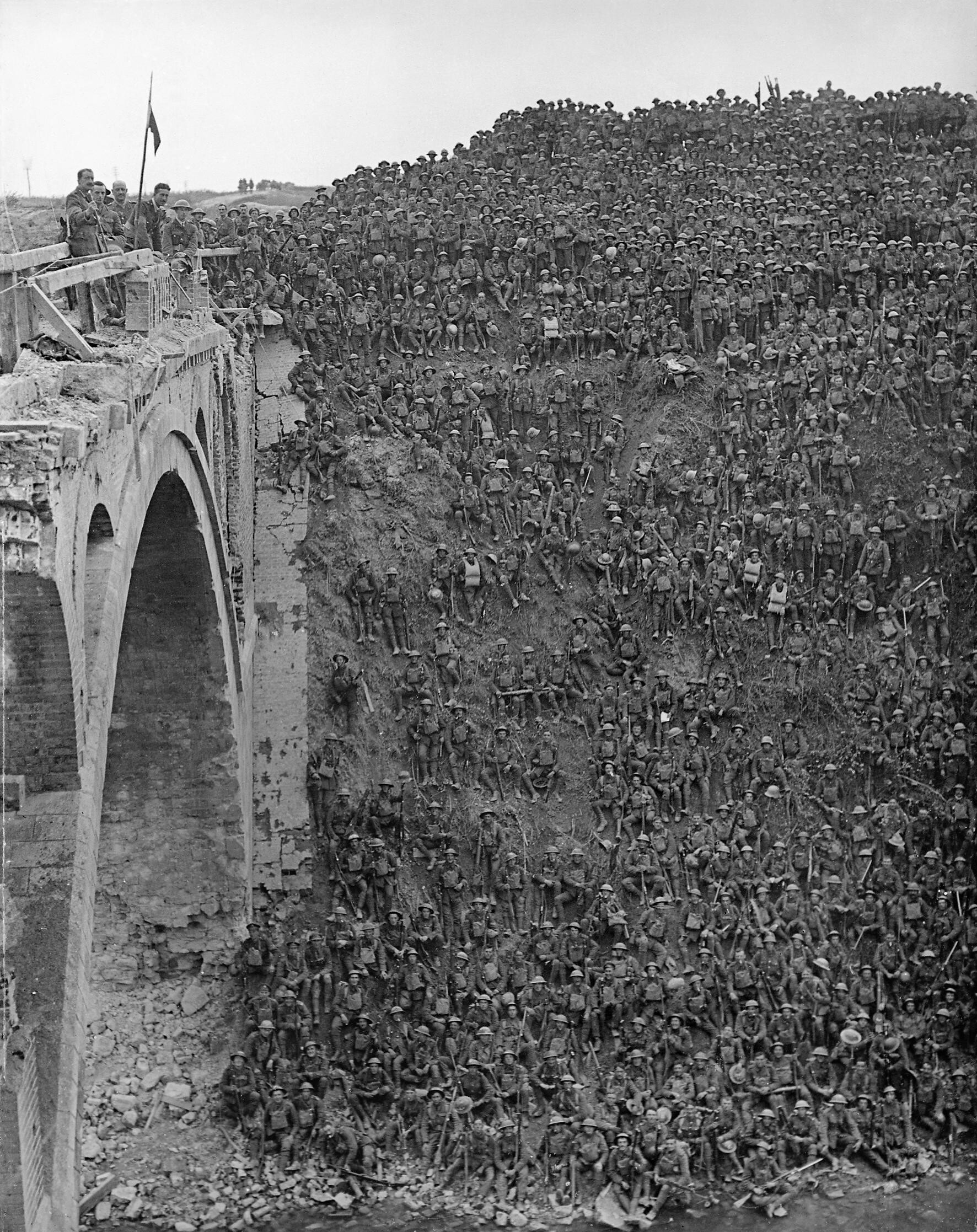
Brigadier-General J.V. Campbell, VC addressing troops of his 137th Brigade from the Riqueval Bridge over the St Quentin Canal

After its previous failures, the 46th Division 'had widely been considered a "dud",' but it was largely untouched by the battles of the German Army's Spring Offensive, and was well rested and thoroughly trained when it took part in the Allied attacks on the Hindenburg Line of late September 1918. It was assigned a key role in the Battle of the St Quentin Canal, being ordered to cross the canal itself between the Bellicourt and Bellenglise tunnels. In this section the canal runs through a deep cutting, both sides of which were covered in barbed wire and concrete pillboxes. 137th Brigade under Brigadier-General John Campbell, VC, was to spearhead this extremely hazardous attack, on a section of line that the Germans considered impregnable. The brigade prepared thoroughly for this amphibious operation, with petrol-tin rafts, collapsible boats, 'mud mats', lifelines and scaling ladders, together with 3000 lifebelts 'scrounged' from cross-Channel leave boats After two days of bombardment and preliminary attacks, there was no chance of surprise, but 29 September dawned with a thick ground fog to help the attackers' smokescreen.

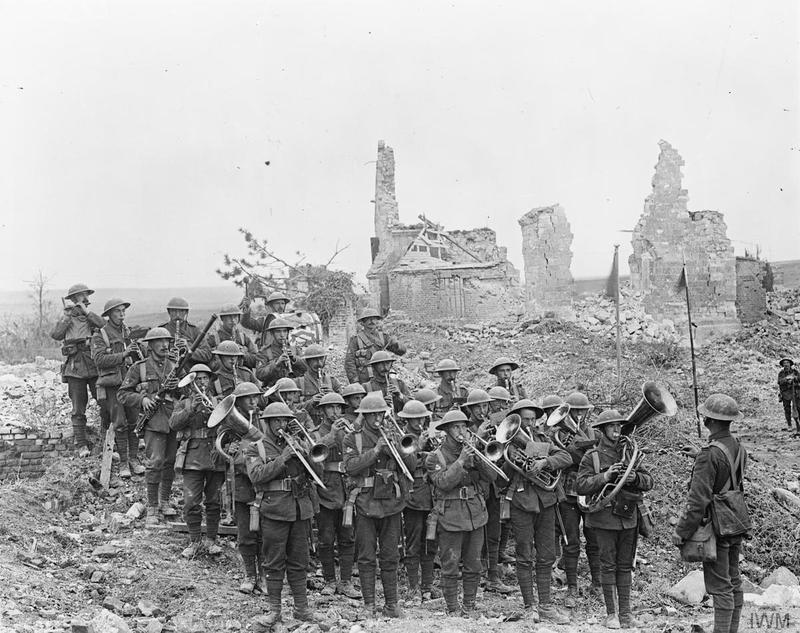
Band of the 137th Brigade playing in the ruins of Bellenglise. 137th Brigade led the assault of the 46th Division on the Canal. 2 October 1918.

The plan was for 137th Brigade to capture the crossings and advance as far as the 'Brown Line', after which 138th and 139th brigades would pass through and continue to the 'Yellow' and 'Green Lines'. At 05.50 the Staffords set off, with almost a mile to go before they reached the canal, following a fast-moving rolling barrage of field guns and machine-guns firing overhead. The canal defences had mostly been destroyed by the heavy artillery, which maintained fire until the last possible moment. The Staffords quickly stormed the outposts and the western trench line, and reached the canal bank on time, with few casualties, and having already taken 120 prisoners. There were 1000 German dead in the trenches, mainly from MG bullets. German reports after the battle complained that their 'SOS barrage' was late, but in fact it came down only five minutes after Zero – indiscriminately on British and Germans alike – yet the Staffords were advancing faster than anyone had predicted. The leading parties went over the canal with their improvised kit and by a single plank bridge left by the Germans. The mist protected the attackers from enfilade fire by MGs along the canal, and they seized the Bellenglise tunnel galleries, trapping hundreds of Germans inside.

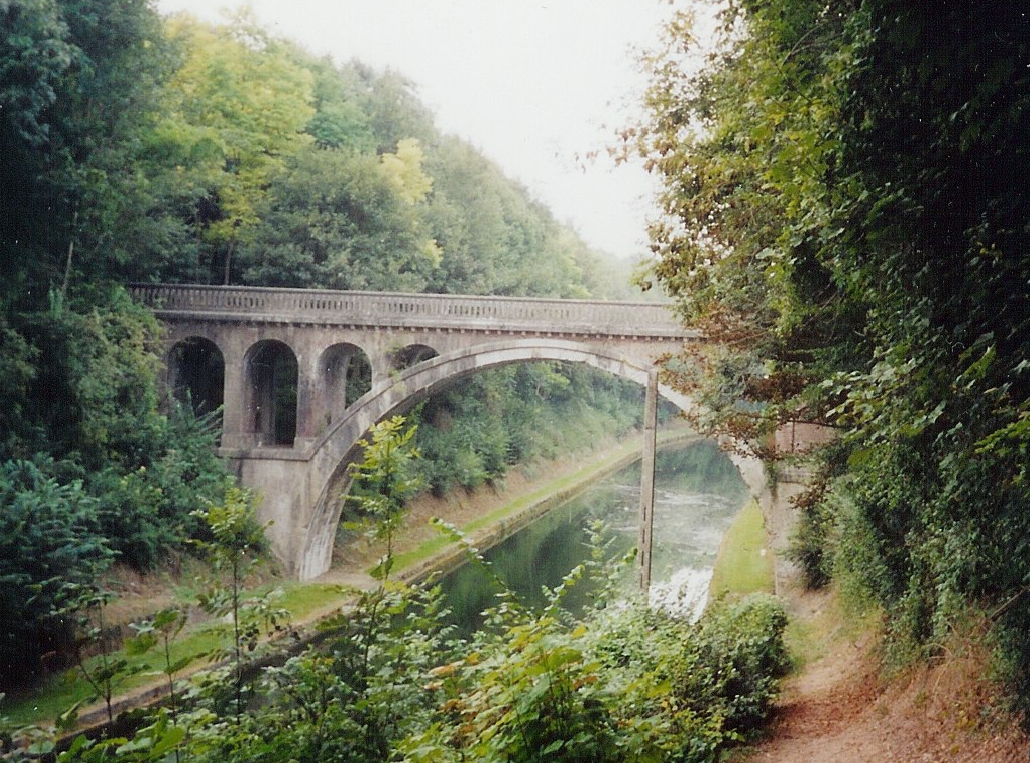
Riqueval Bridge in 2003. The canal banks are much more overgrown than when the bridge was captured during the Battle of the St Quentin Canal

At Riqueval they got an even bigger prize: the Germans had left the concrete bridge standing as the main supply route for their troops on the western bank. The bridge had been prepared for demolition, but the Germans considered the sector impregnable. A company of 6th North Staffs was detailed to rush the bridge before the Germans could blow it. Captain A.H. Charlton and nine men dashed out of the fog, bayoneted the machine-gunners guarding the west end, and ran across the bridge in a race with the demolition party emerging from a bunker at the east end (where a memorial erected by the Western Front Association now stands). The Staffords won the race, shooting the Germans and cutting the leads to the demolition charges.

The Staffords reorganised on the east bank protected by a standing barrage before moving on at 07.30. Platoon commanders used compasses to maintain direction in the fog. By 0820 all three battalions had reached the Brown line, capturing a German battery before it could pull out. Meanwhile, the engineers and divisional pioneers were laying footbridges, and the supporting brigades crossed the canal dryshod to pass through 137th Brigade and head off towards the Yellow Line at 11.20. The battle as a whole was a triumph, described as 'one of the greatest successes of the war on the Western Front'.

=== Final advance ===
The Stafford Brigade played a full part in the final advances of the war. On 3 October it again led 46th Division's assault on the Beaurevoir Line, but on 11 and 12 October it was held up in Riquerval Wood. On 17 October, the 6th North Staffords, holding an enormous frontage in the wood, made a feint attack that allowed the rest of the division to clear Andigny les Fermes. By November, trench warfare had ended, and the brigade was in the forefront of the pursuit up to the Armistice with Germany.

On 11 November 1918, 137th Brigade was at Sains-du-Nord, near Avesnes. It remained at Landrecies and later Le Cateau during the winter of 1918–19, clearing the battlefields as demobilisation proceeded. The last cadres returned home in June 1919.

=== Commanders ===
The following officers commanded 137th Brigade during World War I:

- Col (later Brig-Gen) W. Bromilow (10 October 1912 to 25 March 1915 (sick))
- Brig-Gen E. Feetham (2 April to 18 May 1916 (sick))
- Lt-Col R.R. Raymer (acting, 18 May to 5 June 1916)
- Brig-Gen H.B. Williams (5 June to 9 November 1916)
- Lt-Col W.A. Odling (acting, 9 to 17 November 1916)
- Brig-Gen J.V. Campbell, VC (17 November 1916 to 10 November 1918)
- Brig-Gen M.L. Hornby (from 10 November 1918)

== Interwar years ==
The brigade was reconstituted in the renamed Territorial Army (TA) in 1920 with the same four battalions with which it had entered World War I. Its headquarters was at Whittington Barracks, Lichfield, and later at Fair Oaks House, Rugeley. The following officers commanded the brigade in the interwar years:

- Col L. Holland appointed 1 June 1920.
- Col T.W. Stansfield appointed 26 Mar 1924.
- Col C.J.C. Grant appointed 17 Nov 1925.
- Col H. Clive appointed 21 Nov 1927.
- Col W.J. Cranston appointed 21 Nov1931.
- Col H.H. Stoney appointed 10 Feb 1934.

In December 1936 the 46th (North Midland) Division was disbanded and its headquarters was reconstituted as 2nd Anti-Aircraft Division. The 5th North Staffords was transferred to the Royal Engineers and converted into 41st (The North Staffordshire Regiment) Anti-Aircraft Battalion, Royal Engineers. The 5th and 6th South Staffords and 6th North Staffs of 137th Brigade were transferred to the 166th (South Lancashire and Cheshire) Infantry Brigade of the 55th (West Lancashire) Infantry Division and were later incorporated into a reconstituted 59th (Staffordshire) Motor Division, in the 176th and 177th Infantry brigades.

== World War II ==
A new 137th Infantry Brigade was organised as part of the expansion of the Territorial Army in the spring and summer months just before World War II, but both this and the new 46th Infantry Division formed in October 1939 were 2nd-Line duplicates of the 49th (North Midland and West Riding) Infantry Division and had no Staffordshire connection, with the new 137th Brigade having 2/5th West Yorkshire Regiment, 2/6th and 2/7th Duke of Wellington's Regiment.

== Online sources ==
- British Military History
- Orders of Battle at Patriot Files
- The Long, Long Trail
- The Regimental Warpath 1914–1918
- Richard Stevenson, 'Breaking the Hindenburg Line', Military Illustrated, Issue 277.
