= 118th Brigade (United Kingdom) =

- Active: 10 December 1914–27 April 1915; 12 July 1915–4 December 1918
- Country: United Kingdom
- Branch: British Army
- Type: Infantry
- Size: 3–4 Battalions
- Part of: 39th Division
- Engagements: Battle of the Somme; Battle of the Ancre; Third Battle of Ypres; German spring offensive

Commanders
- Notable commanders: Brig-Gen Edward Bellingham

The 118th Brigade was an infantry formation of the British Army during World War I. Originally raised in December 1914 as part of 'Kitchener's Army' it was later redesignated and the number was transferred to a new brigade formed in July 1915. This initially commanded 'Pals battalions' under training; later it took over experienced Territorial Force battalions that were already serving on the Western Front. It fought with 39th Division on the Somme and the Ancre, at Ypres and in the German spring offensive. After the appalling casualties in that campaign it was relegated to a training organisation preparing US Army units for active service. It was disbanded shortly after the Armistice with Germany.

== Original 118th Brigade ==
Alfred Leete's recruitment poster for Kitchener's Army.

On 6 August 1914, less than 48 hours after Britain's declaration of war, Parliament sanctioned an increase of 500,000 men for the Regular British Army. The newly-appointed Secretary of State for War, Earl Kitchener of Khartoum, issued his famous call to arms: 'Your King and Country Need You', urging the first 100,000 volunteers to come forward. This group of six divisions with supporting arms became known as Kitchener's First New Army, or 'K1'. The K2, K3 and K4 battalions, brigades and divisions followed soon afterwards. But the flood of volunteers overwhelmed the ability of the Army to absorb them, and the K5 units were largely raised by local initiative rather than at regimental depots, often from men from particular localities or backgrounds who wished to serve together: these were known as 'Pals battalions'. The 'Pals' phenomenon quickly spread across the country, as local recruiting committees offered complete units to the War Office (WO). On 10 December 1914 the WO authorised the formation of another six divisions and their brigades to command these K5 units, including 118th Brigade in 39th Division. The original 118th Bde comprised four 'Public Schools Battalions':

- 18th (Service) Battalion, Royal Fusiliers (1st Public Schools)
- 19th (Service) Battalion, Royal Fusiliers (2nd Public Schools)
- 20th (Service) Battalion, Royal Fusiliers (3rd Public Schools)
- 21st (Service) Battalion, Royal Fusiliers (4th Public Schools)

== New 118th Brigade ==
39th Division's insignia.

However, on 10 April 1915 the WO decided to convert the K4 battalions into reserve units. The K4 divisions and brigades were broken up and the K5 formations took over their numbers, so that 118th Brigade in 39th Division became 98th Bde in 33rd Division. Authorisation for three new infantry brigades – 116th, 117th and 118th – to constitute a new 39th Division was issued on 12 July 1915.

The new 118th Brigade was formed in London under the command of Brigadier-General W. Bromilow, composed of the following Pals battalions:

- 10th (Service) Battalion, Queen's Own (Royal West Kent Regiment) (Kent County)
- 11th (Service) Battalion, Queen's Own (Royal West Kent Regiment) (Lewisham)
- 20th (Service) Battalion, Middlesex Regiment (Shoreditch)
- 21st (Service) Battalion, Middlesex Regiment (Islington)

39th Division began to assemble around Winchester early in August 1915, but it was not until after it had moved to Aldershot at the end of September that 118th Bde joined it from London. However, on arrival at Aldershot 118th Bde was reorganised, the 10th and 11th Royal West Kent battalions moving to 41st Division on 16 October, being replaced by:

- 13th (Service) Battalion, East Surrey Regiment (Wandsworth) – transferred from 41st Division
- 14th (Service) Battalion, Argyll and Sutherland Highlanders

In November the division moved to Witley Camp in Surrey, where it continued its training. Mobilisation orders were received during February 1916 and advance parties left for France. However, the Pals battalions of 118th Bde had not completed their training, so it was decided to leave them behind to join 40th Division. On 23rd February Brig-Gen Bromilow and his staff left Witley, disembarked at Le Havre next day, and on 29 February took over five different battalions at Renescure to reconstitute 118th Bde. These were all experienced Territorial Force units that had been sent as reinforcements to various formations on the Western Front earlier in the war:

- 1/6th Battalion, Cheshire Regiment – transferred from 7th Division
- 1/4th (City of Dundee) Battalion, Black Watch – transferred from 51st (Highland) Division
- 1/5th (Angus & Dundee) Battalion, Black Watch – transferred from 51st (H) Division
- 1/1st Battalion, Cambridgeshire Regiment – transferred from training battalion, Third Army School
- 1/1st Battalion, Hertfordshire Regiment – transferred from 2nd Division; to 116th Bde 8 February 1918

The reconstituted brigade moved to the divisional concentration area at Blaringhem in First Army's area. The two weak Black Watch battalions were amalgamated on 16 March as the 4th/5th Battalion, bringing the brigade to the standard four-battalion establishment that was retained until February 1918. The brigade was completed by forming its auxiliary units:

- 118th Brigade Machine Gun Company, Machine Gun Corps – formed at Wallon-Cappel on 21 March from MG sections of the infantry battalions; transferred to 39th Divisional MG Battalion by 14 March 1918
- 118th Trench Mortar Battery – formed within the brigade as 118/1 and 118/2 by 7 April 1916, became 118th TM Bty between 16 June and 1 July; personnel seconded from the infantry battalions; equipped with 3-inch Stokes mortars

=== Service ===
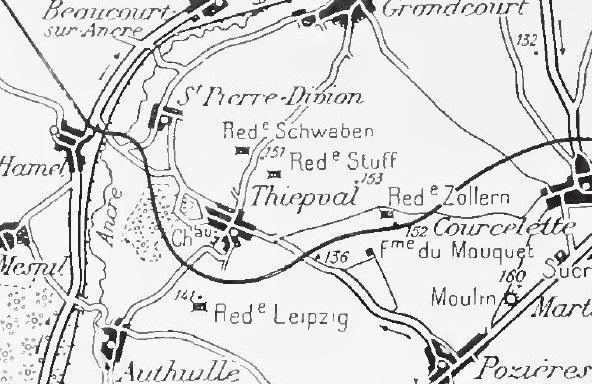
The Ancre battlefield, including Thiepval and the Stuff Redoubt.

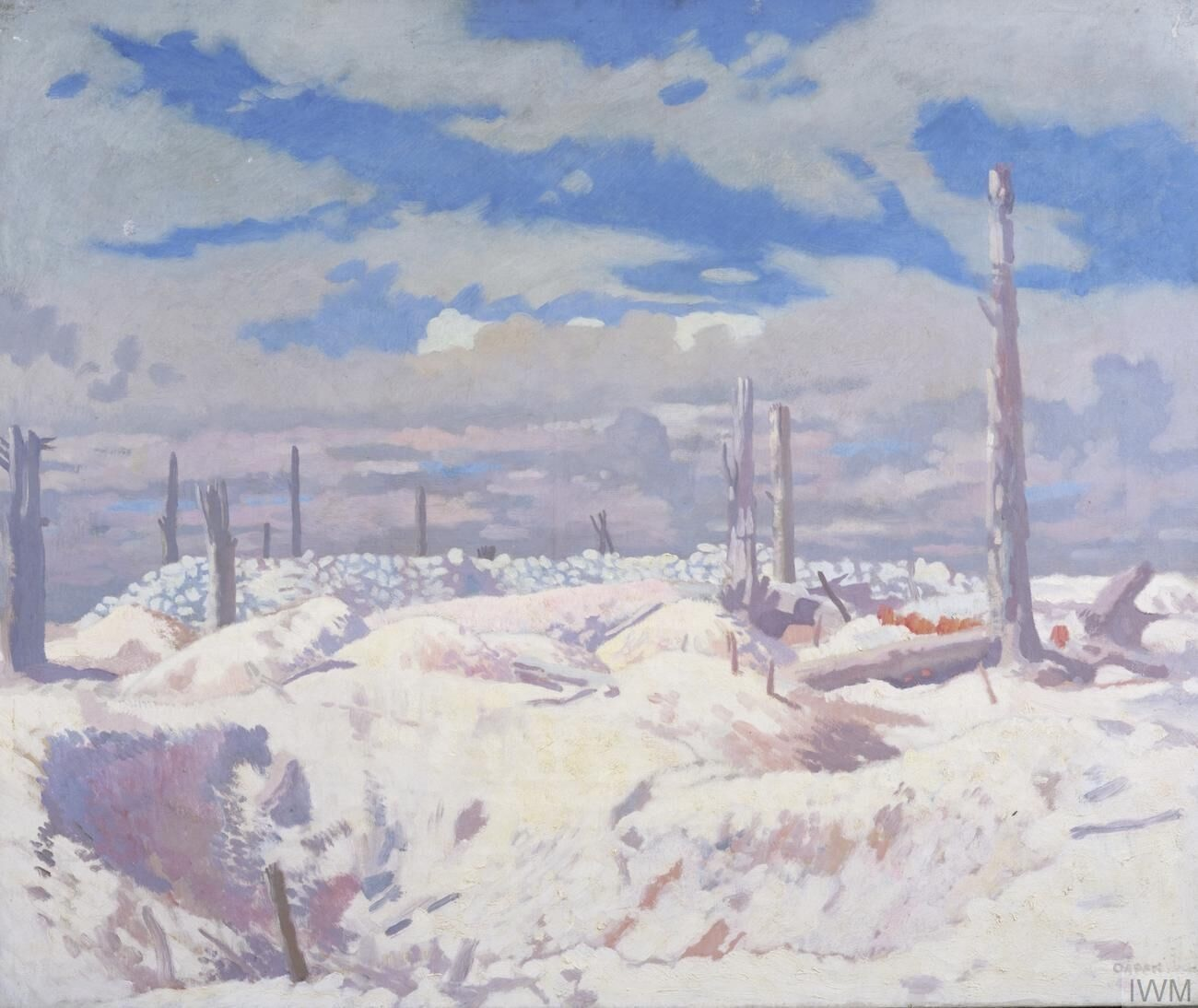
Schwaben Redoubt by William Orpen.

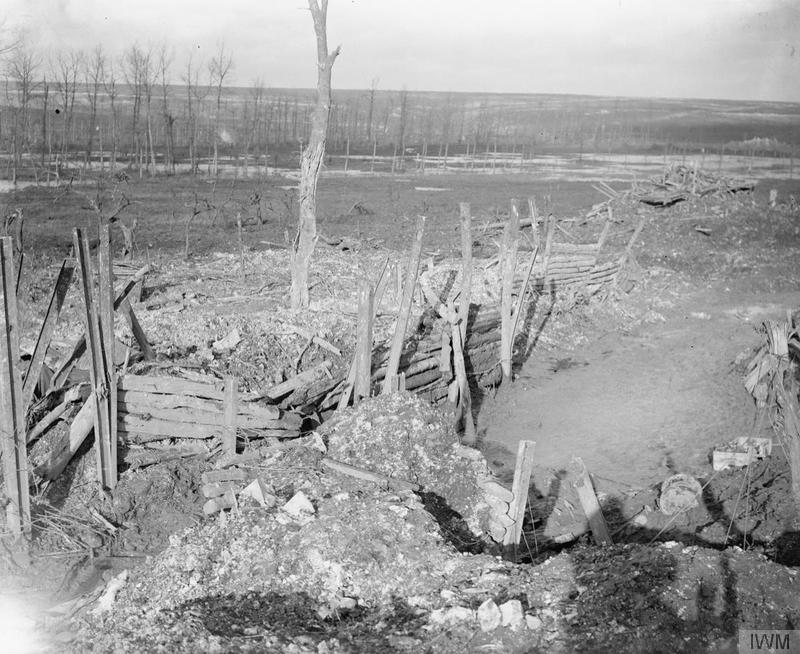
German trench at St Pierre-Divion with the Ancre in the background, after the fighting in November 1916.

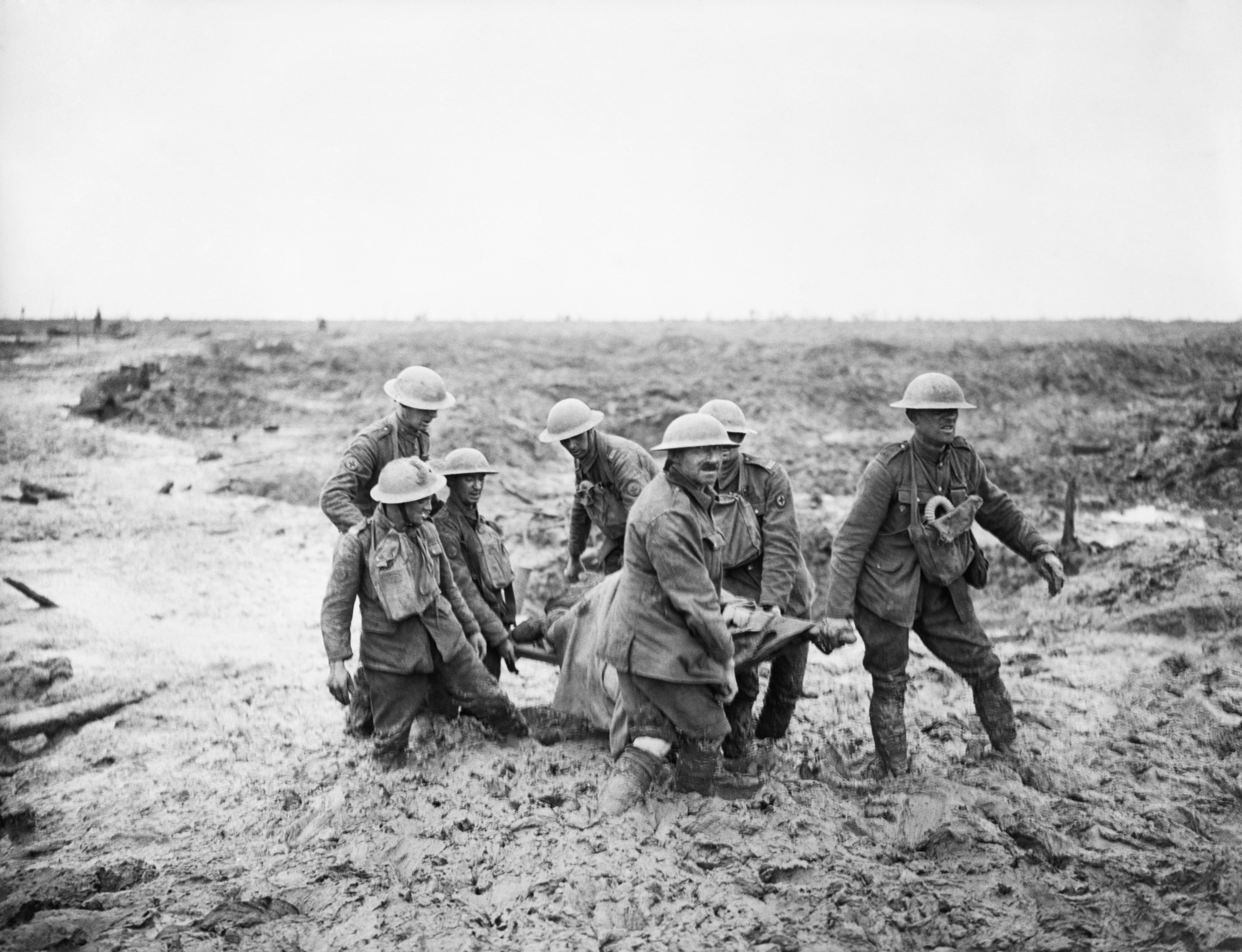
A team of stretcher-bearers struggling to evacuate a wounded man after the Battle of Pilckem Ridge.

The brigade took part in the following actions: The brigade took part in the following actions:

1916

- Battle of the Somme:
  - Fighting on the Ancre 3 September: 118th Bde in divisional reserve; 4th/5th BW assisted 116th Bde
  - Battle of Thiepval Ridge 26–28 September
  - Battle of the Ancre Heights 5 October–11 November
    - Capture of Schwaben Redoubt 14 October: 118th Bde completed its capture
  - Battle of the Ancre 13–14 November: 118th Bde formed up outside the Schwaben Reboubt, unseen by the enemy. Keeping close to the Creeping barrage, 1/1st Herts on the right advanced north and took the 'Hansa Line' and part of 'Mill Trench' without difficulty about 07.30, capturing 150 prisoners. Next to it, two companies of 1/1st Cambridge lost direction and had to reorganise, but took the rest of Mill Trench and then the station crossing and Beaucourt Mill by 10.00. 1/6th Cheshire, aiming for the 'Strasbourg Line' and St Pierre-Divion, and 4/5th BW tasked with taking the German front and support trenches form the village to the river, were both handicapped by the morning fog and experienced difficulties in keeping up with the barrage among the maze of shattered trenches. Confused fighting continued for some time in the Strasburg Line, where some German machine gunners and snipers held out 4th/5th BW lost many officers in slowly clearing the front trenches. A subsidiary attack up the Ancre valley by 117th Bde took the Germans by surprise and St Pierre Divion was finally captured by a mixed group of Cheshires, Black Watch, and 117th Bde, taking so many prisoners that they outnumbered the attackers, who were reinforced by 116th and 117th Bdes to complete the consolidation.

1917

- Third Battle of Ypres:
  - Battle of Pilckem Ridge 31 July–2 August: 118th Bde came up from divisional reserve to connect the main attack with the defensive flank along the Steenbeek valley, but was pushed back by a counter-attack, losing about 70 per cent of its frontline strength.
  - Battle of Langemarck 16–18 August
  - Battle of the Menin Road Ridge 20–25 September: 118th Bde suffered heavy casualties while holding newly-won positions
  - Battle of Polygon Wood 26 September: 118th was held up by deep mud but was able to enter the 'Quadrilateral' before being poushed out again.
  - Second Battle of Passchendaele 29 October–10 November

1918

- German spring offensive:
  - Battle of St Quentin 22–23 March: When the offensive began on 21 March 39th Division was in GHQ Reserve. Having moved up and dug in, 118th Bde was heavily attacked but was able to disengage and retire across the Somme on 23 March
  - Actions at the Somme Crossings 24–25 March: 1/1st Cambridge had to fight a sharp rearguard action to extricate itself
  - Battle of Rosières 26–27 March: 39th Division continued withdrawing, the brigades 'leapfrogging' each other; 118th Bde's commander, Brig-Gen Bellingham, and his Brigade major were captured on 28 March while commanding the rearguard of 39th Division

Each brigade was now hardly stronger than a single battalion, and the infantry of 39th Division was reorganised as '39th Composite Brigade', under the new commander of 118th Bde, Brig-Gen Hubback. No 4 Battalion and part of D Company, No 5 Battalion, were provided by 118th Bde, and 118th Bde TMB supported the composite brigade. The composite brigade then fought in the following actions with XXII Corps:

- Battle of the Lys:
  - Fighting on Wytschaete Ridge 16 April
  - First Battle of Kemmel Ridge 17–19 April)
  - Second Battle of Kemmel Ridge 25–26 April: formed a defensive flank
  - Battle of the Scherpenberg 29 April: in corps reserve

=== Reorganisation ===
While the composite brigade was still in action, 39th Divisional HQ moved to Éperlecques, north-west of Saint-Omer. No 5 Battalion returned to the division on 30 April and its components returned to their brigades; the rest of 39th Composite Bde was broken up and rejoined the division on 6 May. Following their crippling losses during the German spring offensive, the infantry brigades of 39th Division were withdrawn from active service. Their battalions were reduced to training cadres (TCs) and the TMBs broken up, the surplus personnel being drafted as reinforcements to other units. All three of 118th Bde's TCs left by the end of May to be reconstituted in other formations, and it became a holding formation for a number of TCs from other divisions:

- 9th (Service) Battalion, Black Watch – from 46th Bde, 15th (Scottish) Division, 21 May; to 16th (Irish) Division 17 June
- 6th (Service) Battalion, Bedfordshire Regiment – from 112th Bde, 37th Division, 31 May (used to reconstitute 1/1st Herts)
- 8th/10th Battalion, Gordon Highlanders – from 44th Bde, 15th (S) Division, 9 June; to II Corps' Reinforcement Camp 30 July
- 7th (Service) Battalion, Cameron Highlanders – from 44th Bde, 15th (S) Division, 11 June; to XIX Corps' Reinforcement Camp 30 July
- 11th (Service) Battalion, Argyll & Sutherland Highlanders – from 46th Bde, 15th (S) Division, 11 June; to X Corps' Reinforcement Camp 30 July
- 11th (Service) Battalion, Royal Sussex Regiment (1st South Down) – from 116th Bde 17 June; to 25th Division 30 June
- 13th (Service) Battalion, Royal Sussex Regiment (3rd South Down) – from 116th Bde 17 June; disbanded 14 August
- 4th Battalion, Lincolnshire Regiment (TF) – from 117th Bde 27 July; to 116th Bde 16 November
- 18th (Service) Battalion, Northumberland Fusiliers – from 116th Bde 29 July; to 66th Division 15 August
- 4th Battalion, Northumberland Fusiliers (TF) – from 149th (Northumberland) Bde, 50th (Northumbrian) Division, 16 August; demobilised 10 November
- 5th Battalion, Northumberland Fusiliers (TF) – from 149th (N) Bde, 50th (N) Division, 16 August; demobilised 10 November
- 6th Battalion, Northumberland Fusiliers (TF) – from 149th (N) Bde, 50th (N) Division, 16 August; demobilised 9 November
- 4th Battalion, East Lancashire Regiment (TF) – from 198th (East Lancashire) Bde, 66th (2nd East Lancashire) Division, 16 August; to 116th Bde 16 November

The 77th US Division had arrived at Éperlecques, and it began training under the guidance of the 39th Division TCs on 7 May. On 7 June 39th Divisional HQ moved to Wolphus, also near Saint-Omer, and over the next two months its TCs trained the 30th, 78th and 80th US Divisions in turn. In mid-August 39th Division moved to the French coast with 118th Bde at Le Havre. On 1 November the division was ordered to demobilise its remaining TCs, and 118th Bde completed this before hostilities ended with the Armistice with Germany on 11 November. 118th Brigade was disbanded on 4 December.

118th Brigade was not reactivated during World War II

== Commanders ==
The following officers commanded the brigade:

- Brig-Gen R.G. Gordon-Gilmour, appointed (to original 118th Bde) 22 September 1914
- Brig-Gen W. Bromilow, appointed (to new 118th Bde) 8 July 1915
- Brig-Gen T.P. Barrington, appointed 15 April 1916, sick 7 July 1916
- Lt-Col G.A.McL. Sceales (4th/5th BW), acting 7–12 July 1916, 13 November 1916 and 4 December 1916–2 February 1917
- Brig-Gen E.H. Finch-Hatton, appointed 13 July 1916, sick 13 November and 4 December 1916
- Brig-Gen E.H.C.P. Bellingham, appointed 3 February 1917, captured 28 March 1918
- Lt-Col E.T. Saint, acting 28 March–2 April 1918
- Brig-Gen A.B. Hubback, appointed 3 April 1918
- Lt-Col H.R. Brown acting 20–21 October 1918 and 6 November 1918 to disbandment
- Brig-Gen M.L. Hornby, appointed 22 October 1918

== Insignia ==
39th Division's formation badge was a white square with three light blue vertical stripes. This was worn on the upper arm. Within 118th Bde, the battalions wore the following identification signs on both sleeves:

- 1/6th Cheshire: red diamond with black diamond in the centre
- 4th/5th Black Watch: none worn
- 1/1st Cambridgeshire: pale blue horizontal rectangle bisected by a vertical black stripe
- 1/1st Hertfordshire: maroon heart shape
