= Thompson Capper =

British Army general (1863–1915)

Sir Thompson Capper KCMG CB DSO
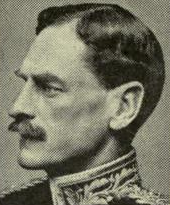
- Born: 20 October 1863; Lucknow, British India
- Died: 27 September 1915 (aged 51); Loos, France
- Relatives: Major General Sir John Capper (brother); Colonel William Capper (brother)
- Military career
- Allegiance: United Kingdom
- Branch: British Army
- Service years: 1882–1915
- Rank: Major-General
- Unit: East Lancashire Regiment
- Commands: Staff College, Quetta; 13th Infantry Brigade; 7th Division
- Conflicts: Chitral expedition Mahdist War; Second Boer War; First World War
- Awards: Knight Commander of the Order of St Michael and St George; Companion of the Order of the Bath; Distinguished Service Order; Mention in dispatches (2)

Major-General Sir Thompson Capper, KCMG, CB, DSO (20 October 1863 – 27 September 1915) was a senior British Army officer who served with distinction in the Second Boer War and was a divisional commander during the First World War. At the Battle of Loos in 1915, Capper was shot by a sniper as he reconnoitered the front line during an assault by his division on German positions. He died the next day in a casualty clearing station from wounds to both lungs; his grave is in the nearby Lillers Communal Cemetery.

Capper was an active and vigorous soldier who had been wounded just six months before his death in an accidental grenade detonation. Shortly before this wound he had been knighted by King George V for his service in command of his division during the First Battle of Ypres. Field Marshal Sir John French commented upon his death that "he was a most distinguished and capable leader and his death will be severely felt." He was also a keen military historian and his collected papers are currently stored at the Liddell Hart Centre for Military Archives at King's College London.

== Early life and military career ==
Thompson Capper was born in October 1863 to William and Sarah Capper (née Copeland). William Capper was a civil servant with the Bengal Civil Service and Sarah was the daughter of industrialist William Copeland. Thompson and his elder brother John were born in Lucknow in British India but at a young age were sent to England for their education. Thompson Capper attended Haileybury and Imperial Service College and the Royal Military College, Sandhurst, before being commissioned into the East Lancashire Regiment of the British Army as a lieutenant on 9 September 1882. He was soon posted to join the 1st Battalion of his regiment, then serving in British India.

Capper's early years as a subaltern were spent employed on home service for the next decade and whilst serving as regimental adjutant was promoted to captain on 22 April 1891, before being transferred with his unit to India. It was there that Capper saw his first action, when in 1895 his battalion, the 1st East Lancashire, was attached to a force sent to the Indian-Afghan border to relieve a trapped British force in Chitral. He then returned to Britain where he attended the Staff College, Camberley. Capper, it is said, "shone at Camberley", and among his fellow students there included Edmund Allenby and Douglas Haig, Richard Haking, William Furse and George Macdonogh, William Birkbeck, William Douglas, Henry Heath, George Forestier-Walker, James Thomason Johnston, Arthur Sandbach and Lionel Stopford, along with Arthur Blair, James Edward Edmonds, Neil Douglas Findlay, Henry O'Donnell and Michael Edward Willoughby, all of whom would rise to the rank of brigadier general or higher during their military careers, with both Allenby and Haig becoming field marshals. In 1898 he was again in action as an advisor to an Egyptian unit of the Anglo-Egyptian army under Horatio Kitchener which travelled down the Nile in the final campaign of the Mahdist War. During these operations, Capper participated in the Battle of Atbara and was with the force which fought in the culminating Battle of Omdurman. He received a brevet promotion to major on 16 November 1898. In July 1899 he succeeded Captain George Forestier-Walker as a staff captain at the War Office.

== Second Boer War ==
Later that year Capper and his regiment were again engaged in Africa, being transported to South Africa to serve in the Second Boer War. There Capper performed his duties with distinction for the next three years, being heavily engaged at the defeat of Spion Kop and participating in the relief of Ladysmith in early 1900. He remained in South Africa engaged in guerilla operations against the Boer forces until the Armistice of May 1902, commanding a flying column in the Cape Colony. During the war, he received a brevet appointment as lieutenant colonel on 29 November 1900, and was promoted to the substantive rank of major on 5 December 1901.

Following the war's conclusion in May 1902, Capper was awarded the Distinguished Service Order (DSO) on his return home. He was also awarded the Queen's South Africa Medal with six clasps and the King's South Africa Medal with two clasps in recognition of his service during the war, and was twice mentioned in dispatches. Capper returned to the United Kingdom in the SS Dunottar Castle, which arrived at Southampton in July 1902.

== Interwar years ==
After his return, Capper, having "proved himself an effective staff officer and had gained considerable experience of independent battlefield command", was initially selected as a deputy assistant adjutant general (DAAG) on the staff of the 1st Army Corps at Aldershot, but, as an experienced staff officer, he was shortly thereafter given a post as a professor at the Staff College from December 1902 to September 1904. His arrival there "coincided with the appointment of Sir Henry Rawlinson as Commandant", both men having "served together in both Sudan and South Africa". Among Capper's fellow instructors there included Hubert Gough, Richard Haking (a fellow student from many years earlier), Launcelot Kiggell, John Du Cane, George Barrow and George Aston of the Royal Marines. He was then made a DAAG there in February 1904 and was promoted to brevet colonel on 11 December 1904. He was then transferred to the Staff College, Quetta, in India as the new college's first commandant (and which saw him promoted to substantive colonel). It has been suggested that this move was initiated by jealous colleagues at the college due to his ability as a teacher and tactician. He retained this position until 1911, teaching the lessons of the recent Russo-Japanese War and emphasising the importance of "attacking dash" as the best means of overcoming entrenched positions. He came into contact with numerous important figures of the First World War through this work, including Douglas Haig, with whom he did not get on, and Hubert Gough, who admired his "spirit of self-sacrifice and duty, instead of the idea of playing for safety and seeking only to avoid getting into trouble". He also amassed a prodigious collection of military literature during his research and teaching.

In July 1906 he was promoted to temporary brigadier general and in 1908 he married Winifride Mary, with whom he would have one son.

In 1910 his work at the college was recognised with appointment as a Companion of the Order of the Bath (CB) in the King's Birthday Honours. In February 1911, after a brief period of half-pay, and reverting to his permanent rank of colonel, Capper was transferred from India to Ireland, where he was promoted once again to temporary brigadier general and succeeded Major General Charles Monro as general officer commanding (GOC) of the 13th Infantry Brigade, part of the 5th Division. He "proved immensely successful as a trainer of troops, setting a standard to which others sought to aspire". He relinquished command of the brigade in February 1914 to Colonel Gerald Cuthbert and briefly returned to Ireland, in the aftermath of the Curragh incident, to support his friend, Brigadier General Hubert Gough, now GOC of the 3rd Cavalry Brigade. On 1 February 1914 Capper relinquished command of the brigade and was made the inspector of infantry. On 12 May he was promoted to major general.

== First World War ==
On 27 August, twenty three days after the British entry into World War I, he was posted to the newly formed 7th Division as its first GOC, which was sent to the Western Front.

During the opening weeks of the war, Capper busied himself with organising the new division placed under his command; the work involved in this task meant that the division was not ready for action until October.

On 6 October his 7th Division, comprising Harold Ruggles-Brise's 20th, Herbert Watts's 21st, and Sydney Lawford's 22nd infantry brigades and supporting elements, arrived at Zeebrugge just as the German forces began to push into that area as part of the "Race for the Sea". Initially forced back, Capper's division covered the Belgian withdrawal to the Yser and then held the line near the town of Ypres.

For the next two months, the 7th Division was embroiled in bitter fighting at the First Battle of Ypres, when they were crucial in stopping the German advance but lost over 10,000 men. The Times later stated that "no one but Capper himself could, night after night, by the sheer force of his personality, have reconstituted from the shattered fragments of battalions a fighting line that could last through tomorrow".

For the service he and his men provided during the battle, Capper was awarded a knighthood as a Knight Commander of the Order of St Michael and St George (KCMG) in early 1915.

Remaining on the front lines during the winter of 1914–1915, Capper's men held the German advance and were given some respite in early 1915 with the arrival of Territorial Force (TF) units.

It was during one of these rest periods that Capper was seriously wounded when in April 1915 he was struck in the shoulder by shrapnel from a "Jam-tin bomb" during a demonstration of improvised grenades being held behind the lines. He was temporarily replaced by Major General Hubert Gough and returned to England to convalesce, but was back with the 7th Division on 19 July 1915.

=== Battle of Loos ===
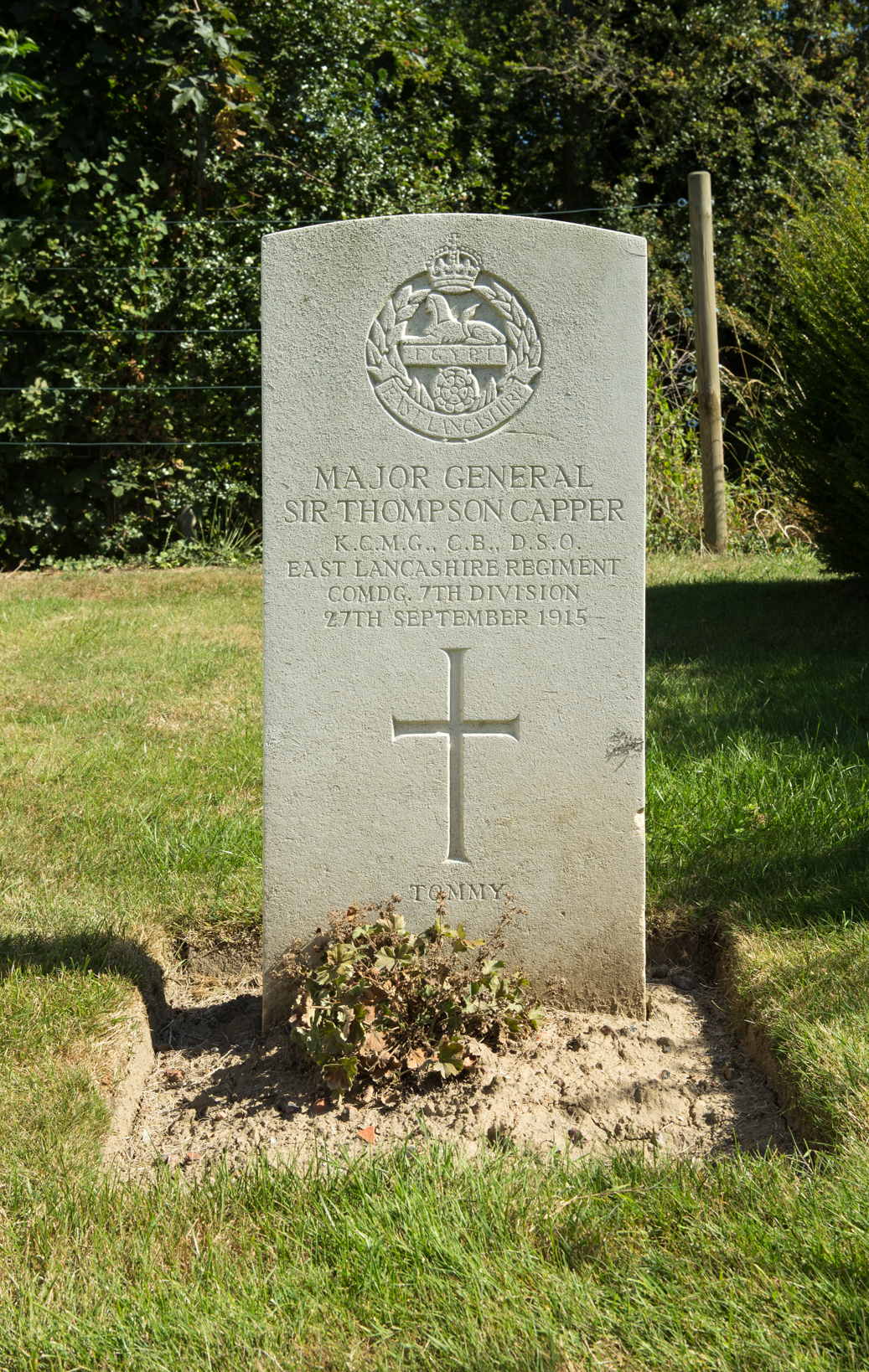
CWGC gravestone for Major General Sir Thompson Capper.

In late September 1915, the division was assigned to participate in the Battle of Loos against fortified German positions at Loos-en-Gohelle and Hulluch. Advancing on 26 September against furious German opposition, the 7th Division was held up several times and Capper visited the frontline to view the enemy for himself from the captured trenches.

Urging his men into a final assault, Capper stayed behind to view the field and was struck by a sniper's bullet fired from houses along the line of advance which were thought to have been abandoned. The assault failed and Capper was discovered by his retreating units and taken to Number 6 Casualty Clearing Station at Lillers to the rear of British lines personally by Captain O'Reilly, a medical officer. O'Reilly had gone out at 8pm to bring Capper in from the battlefield (the war diary suggests that Capper had been wounded at 5.50pm) and had arranged for the wound to be dressed at the divisional collecting station before onward transfer to the CCS – O'Reilly was subsequently recommended for the Military Cross (MC). The bullet had penetrated both lungs, and doctors gave no hope of survival.

Major-General Sir Thompson Capper died the following day, on 27 September 1915 in the casualty clearing station, at the age of 52. He was the third of nine British divisional commanders to be killed or die of wounds during the war. (Note: The other fatalities were: Hubert Hamilton, GOC 3rd Division, Samuel Lomax, GOC 1st Division, George Thesiger, GOC 9th (Scottish) Division, Frederick Wing, GOC 12th (Eastern) Division, Edward Ingouville-Williams, GOC 34th Division, Robert Broadwood, GOC 57th (2nd West Lancashire) Division, Edward Feetham, GOC 39th Division, and Louis Lipsett, GOC 4th Division.) His division, which was soon taken over by Watts, GOC 21st Brigade, had lost over 5,200 men killed or wounded in just three days of fighting.

Following his death, a rumour abounded that he had been killed charging the German lines on horseback. This story has persisted despite eye-witness accounts to the contrary. Capper was buried in Lillers Communal Cemetery behind British lines and his grave is marked by a Commonwealth War Graves Commission (CWGC) headstone bearing the inscription TOMMY. He is also commemorated on the War Memorial in Rayne, Essex, where he spent much of his boyhood with his uncle, the Rector of Rayne, Rev W S Hemming. His collected papers were donated to King's College London in 1971, where they are still available to researchers and contain a wide selection of primary materials concerning the warfare of the early twentieth century.

== See also ==
- List of generals of the British Empire who died during the First World War

== Bibliography ==
- Jones, Spencer (2015). Stemming the Tide: Officers and Leadership in the British Expeditionary Force 1914. Helion. ISBN 978-1910294727.

Military offices
Preceded by A. W. L. Bayly	Commandant of the Staff College, Quetta; 1906–1911	Succeeded by Walter Braithwaite
New command	GOC 7th Division; 1914–1915	Succeeded by Hubert Gough
Preceded by Hubert Gough	GOC 7th Division; July–September 1915	Succeeded by Herbert Watts
