= Gerald Cuthbert =

British Army general (1881–1931)

Major-General Gerald Cuthbert CB CMG
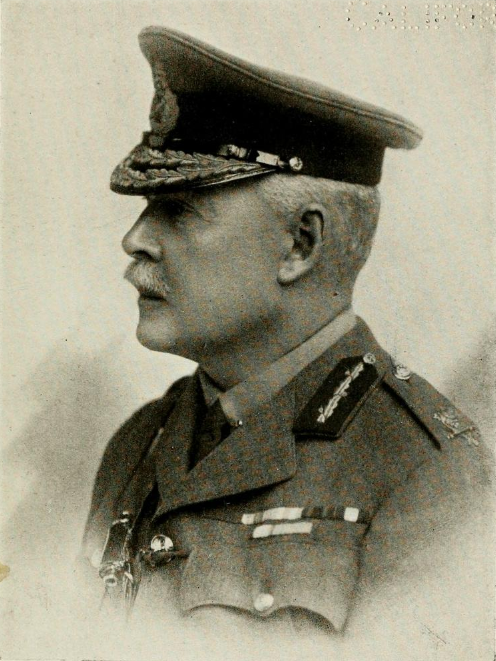
- Cuthbert in c. 1917
- Born: 12 September 1861; London, England
- Died: 1 February 1931 (aged 69)
- Military career
- Allegiance: United Kingdom
- Branch: British Army
- Service years: 1882–1919
- Rank: Major-General
- Nicknames: "Bluebell" "Spit and Polish"
- Unit: Scots Guards
- Commands: 72nd Division; 39th Division; 13th Infantry Brigade; 4th London Infantry Brigade; 1st Battalion, Scots Guards
- Conflicts: Mahdist War; Second Boer War; First World War
- Awards: Companion of the Order of the Bath; Companion of the Order of St Michael and St George; Mentioned in Despatches

Major-General Gerald James Cuthbert, CB, CMG (12 September 1861 – 1 February 1931) was a British Army officer who commanded a battalion in the Second Boer War and a division in the First World War. Cuthbert joined the Scots Guards in 1882 and served in Egypt and the Sudan during the late 19th century. During the Boer War he served with his regiment, rising to command a battalion. After the war he commanded a brigade in the Territorial Force and then in the British Expeditionary Force of 1914. He served on the Western Front from 1914 to 1917, rising to command the 39th Division, then returned to home service before retiring in 1919.

== Early military career ==
The fifth son of William Cuthbert of Beaufront Castle in Northumberland, Gerald was privately educated, and attended the Royal Military College at Sandhurst. He was commissioned as a subaltern, with the rank of lieutenant, in the Oxfordshire Light Infantry (later the Oxfordshire and Buckinghamshire Light Infantry) in May 1882, before transferring to the Scots Guards just two months later. He served with the 2nd Battalion of his regiment during the Sudan Expedition of 1885, where he saw service at the Battle of Suakin.

In April 1889, after being seconded for service on the staff, he was made an aide-de-camp to Major General Frederick Forestier-Walker at Aldershot, an assignment he held until 1890. He was promoted from supernumerary lieutenant to lieutenant in February 1891, although this was later antedated to December 1890. Returning to his regiment, he was promoted to captain in May 1893, and appointed adjutant of the 2nd Battalion, Scots Guards, from February 1895 to February 1899. He was promoted to major in June 1899.

Cuthbert served extensively during the Second Boer War, seeing action at Belmont, Enslin, Modder River, Magersfontein, Poplar Grove, Driefontein, Vet River, Zand River, Johannesburg, Pretoria, Diamond Hill, Riet Vlei, and Belfast. Between January and July 1901, he was commanding officer (CO) of the 1st Battalion, Scots Guards. He was mentioned in dispatches during the war, and given a brevet promotion to lieutenant colonel (dated 29 November 1900) in the South Africa Honours list 1901.

Back with the regiment's 2nd Battalion on the conclusion of hostilities in June 1902, he left Port Natal with men of this battalion on the SS Michigan in late September 1902, arriving at Southampton in late October, when the battalion was posted to Aldershot.

Following the war, Cuthbert was promoted to substantive lieutenant colonel in April 1904 and was again CO of the 1st Battalion. In August 1905 he was promoted again, this time to brevet colonel. This appointment only lasted until April 1906, when he was relieved of his command and placed on half-pay after an inquiry into ragging in the battalion. Later that year, after being removed off half-pay, he was posted to Egypt as a temporary assistant adjutant-general (AAG); this was made permanent in December, when he was promoted to substantive colonel. He remained on the staff in Egypt until September 1909. He then returned home to command the 4th London Brigade in the 2nd London Division, a Territorial Force (TF) unit. He also commanded the regimental district of the Scots Guards.

In June 1912 he was created a Companion of the Order of the Bath (CB) in the 1912 Birthday Honours. He relinquished this assignment in October 1913 and was then placed again on half-pay. By now removed from half-pay, in February 1914 he was promoted to the temporary rank of brigadier general and was appointed to succeed Brigadier General Thompson Capper in command of the 13th Infantry Brigade, a Regular Army brigade which formed part of the 5th Division, at the time stationed in Ireland.

== First World War ==
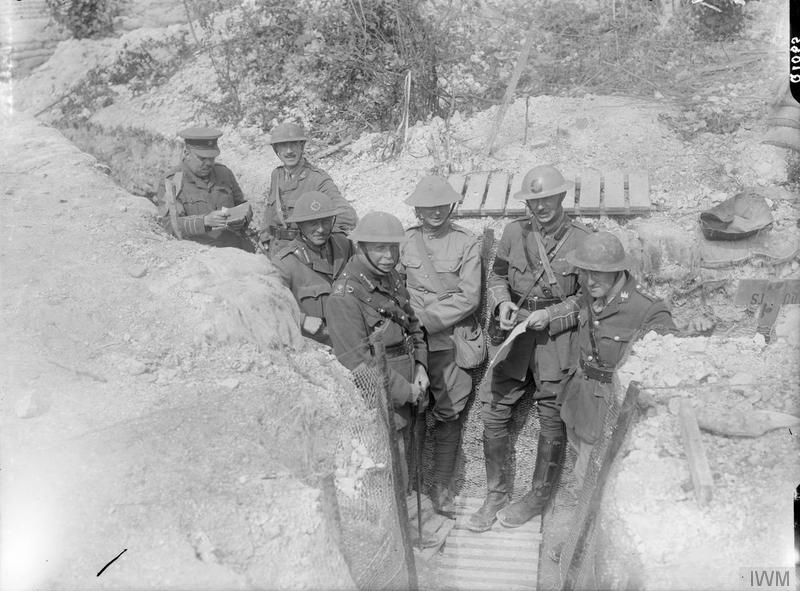
Major-General Gerald Cuthbert (holding a walking stick) and Brigadier-General George Armytage (behind Cuthbert) with their staff in a trench near Thiepval Wood, July 1916.

After the First World War began in August 1914, Cuthbert remained in command of 13th Brigade when it was mobilised for service in the British Expeditionary Force. He took the brigade to France and commanded it through the Retreat from Mons, the First Battle of the Marne and the First Battle of the Aisne. He was sent back to England at the end of September and placed on "invalid" status. He was succeeded by William Hickie.

On 26 November, Cuthbert was appointed to take command of the 140th Infantry Brigade, a Territorial unit, which he had commanded in its peacetime incarnation as the 4th London Brigade, of the 47th (2nd London) Division. He remained with them through 1915 and 1916, culminating in the German attack on Vimy Ridge in May 1916, where Cuthbert led the division in lieu of the divisional commander, who was on leave. He was not a popular brigadier; the London volunteers particularly objected to his strict views on cleanliness, a story circulated that he had ordered front-line trenches to be swept out with brooms. He was nicknamed "Spit and Polish" by the infantry as a result of his obsession with appearances, alongside his earlier nickname of "Bluebell", which may have been a reference to a brand of polish.

Cuthbert left the 140th Brigade in early July 1916, as he was promoted to the temporary rank of major general to become the new general officer commanding (GOC) of the 39th Division, a Kitchener's Army formation, taking over from Major General Robert Dawson, who had only been in command for a few weeks. He commanded it during the later phases of the Battle of the Somme and the Battle of Pilckem. His record with the division was not well received by his superiors; Lieutenant General Claud Jacob of II Corps described him as "obstinate and mulish" during the Battle of the Somme, whilst Lieutenant General Ivor Maxse of XVIII Corps noted he had "little or no conception of training methods", and "few ideas" regarding tactical operations; his only merit was perceived to be his rigorous approach to discipline. His major general's rank became substantive in January 1917.

The end of his period in command of the 39th arrived in August 1917 when Cuthbert was transferred to the United Kingdom to command the 72nd Division on home service. He later commanded Shorncliffe Army Camp, before retiring from the army in August 1919, by which time the war was over.

== Retirement ==
Cuthbert never married. After he retired from the service, he lived in Sandhoe Garden Cottage on the family estate at Beaufront Castle. He died in February 1931, aged 69.
