= 39th Division (United Kingdom) =

- Division insignia
- Active: 1915–1919
- Country: United Kingdom
- Branch: British Army
- Type: Infantry
- Size: Division

Commanders
- Notable commanders: Gerald Cuthbert; Neill Malcolm; Cyril Blacklock

The 39th Division was an infantry formation of the British Army, raised as part of Kitchener's New Armies during World War I. It did not have a regional title, but was composed primarily of recruits from the Midlands, London, and the south of England. Most of its original units had been raised by local communities, and bore the names of their towns or sponsors. After training and home service, it deployed to the Western Front in early 1916 and saw action at the Somme, at Ypres and against the German spring offensive of 1918. Following near-destruction at the Battle of the Lys, the division was reduced to a cadre, which spent the remainder of the war training newly arrived units of the American Expeditionary Forces (AEF). It was disbanded in July 1919 after the end of the war.

== Recruitment and training ==
Alfred Leete's recruitment poster for Kitchener's Army.

On 6 August 1914, less than 48 hours after Britain's declaration of war, Parliament sanctioned an increase of 500,000 men for the Regular British Army. The newly-appointed Secretary of State for War, Earl Kitchener of Khartoum, issued his famous call to arms: 'Your King and Country Need You', urging the first 100,000 volunteers to come forward. This group of six divisions with supporting arms became known as Kitchener's First New Army, or 'K1'. The K2, K3 and K4 battalions, brigades and divisions followed soon afterwards. But the flood of volunteers overwhelmed the ability of the Army to absorb them, and by the time the Fifth New Army (K5) was authorised, many of its constituent units were being organised as 'Pals battalions' under the auspices of mayors and corporations of towns up and down the country. On 10 December 1914 the War Office (WO) authorised the formation of another six divisions and their brigades to command these K5 units, including 39th Division consisting of 116th, 117th and 118th Brigades.

However, on 10 April 1915 the WO decided to convert the K4 battalions into reserve units. The K4 divisions and brigades were broken up and the K5 formations took over their numbers, so that 39th Division became 32nd Division. A new 39th Division was authorised on 27 April and authorisation for three new infantry brigades – 116th, 117th and 118th – was issued on 12 July 1915, but in practice 116th Bde was created by renumbering 121st Bde from the original 40th Division, and only 117th and 118th were newly-formed.

The new 39th Division began to assemble around Winchester in Hampshire early in August 1915, but when it moved to Aldershot at the end of September it still consisted of little more than 117th Bde Headquarters (HQ) and three of its battalions. In November the division moved to Witley Camp in Surrey, where the remaining units joined and it completed its training. Mobilisation orders were received during February 1916, but it was considered that the Pals battalions of 118th Bde were not yet ready for active service. They were left behind and 118th Bde Headquarters (HQ) went to Le Havre in France on 23 February to take over command of five experienced Territorial Force battalions that had been sent as reinforcements to various formations on the Western Front earlier in the war. After some delays the rest of the division began entrainment for Southampton Docks on 2 March. Disembarkation at Le Havre was completed on 8 March and the division concentrated round Blaringhem in First Army's area by 11 March.

== Service ==
The Division took part in the following actions:

1916

- Battle of the Somme:
  - Fighting on the Ancre 3 September
  - Battle of Thiepval Ridge 26–28 September
  - Battle of the Ancre Heights 5 October–11 November
    - Capture of Schwaben Redoubt 14 October
    - Capture of Stuff Trench 21 October
  - Battle of the Ancre 13–14 November

1917

- Third Battle of Ypres:
  - Battle of Pilckem Ridge 31 July–2 August
  - Battle of Langemarck 16–18 August
  - Battle of the Menin Road Ridge 20–25 September
  - Battle of Polygon Wood 26 September
  - Second Battle of Passchendaele 29 October–10 November

1918

- German spring offensive:
  - Battle of St Quentin 22–23 March
  - Actions at the Somme Crossings 24–25 March
  - Battle of Bapaume 24–25 March
  - Battle of Rosières 26–27 March

The General Officer Commanding, Major-General Edward Feetham, was killed in action on 29 March 1918.

After its heavy casualties, including the loss of its commander, 39th Divisional HQ was withdrawn, but its infantry brigades were combined into a single composite brigade. This brigade as well as the divisional artillery, continued fighting:

39th Division Composite Brigade:

- Battle of the Lys:
  - Fighting on Wytschaete Ridge 16 April
  - First Battle of Kemmel Ridge17–19 April)
  - Second Battle of Kemmel Ridge 25–26 April
  - Battle of the Scherpenberg 29 April

39th Divisional Artillery:

- Battle of the Avre 4 April
- Second Battles of Arras:
  - Battle of the Scarpe 26–30 August
  - Battle of the Drocourt-Quéant Line 2–3 September
- Battles of the Hindenburg Line:
  - Battle of the Canal du Nord 27 September–1 October
  - Battle of Cambrai 8–9 October
  - Pursuit to the Selle 9–12 October
- Battle of Valenciennes 1–2 November

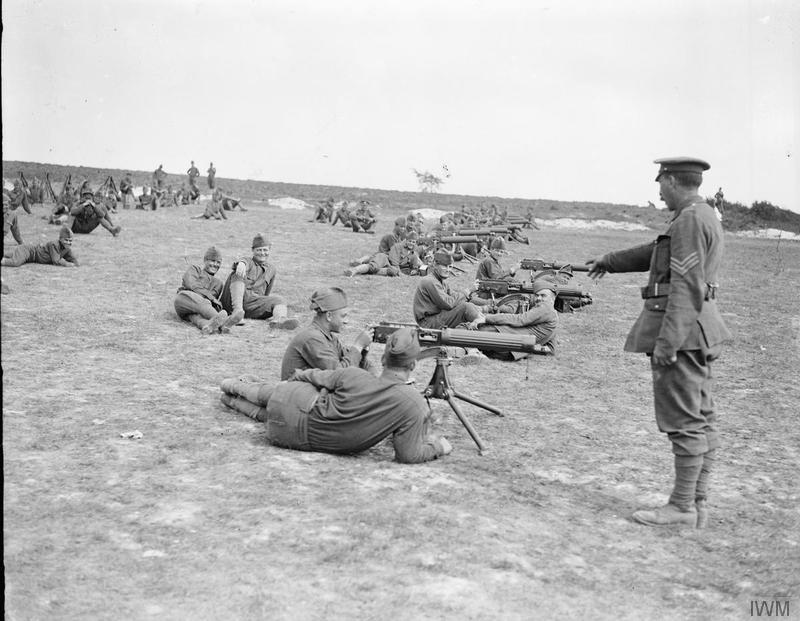
Machine gunners of the U.S. 77th Division during training under the 39th Battalion, MGC, of British 39th Division, near Moulle, France, 22 May 1918.

On 6 May 1918 the remnants of the composite brigade rejoined divisional HQ at Eperlecques, near Saint-Omer where the infantry battalions were reduced to Training Cadres (TCs). A TC generally comprised 10 officers and 45 ORs and their surplus personnel were drafted as reinforcements to other units. A large number of TCs from other formations were also transferred into 39th Division, and on 7 May they began preparing the 77th US Division for front-line service. On 7 June 39th Divisional HQ moved to Wolphus, also near Saint-Omer, and over the next two months its TCs trained the 30th, 78th and 80th US Divisions in turn. In mid-August 39th Division moved to the French coast. On 1 November the division. was ordered to demobilise its remaining TCs, and this was completed before hostilities ended when the Armistice with Germany came into force on 11 November. 117th and 118th Bdes were disbanded on 18 November and 4 December respectively, but 197th Bde joined on 18 November from Line of communication duties and the division took over No 2 Line of Communication Reception Camp (for malarial convalescents) at Martin-Église, was redesignated 117th Bde on 19 November. In December 116th Bde HQ went to Le Havre to form the staff of the embarkation camp, while in January 1919 197th Bde moved to the General Base Reinforcement Depot at No 8 Camp, Le Havre. The transport was disbanded on 29 January, except 287th Company, which became Fifth Army Horse Transport Vehicle Reception Park until it disbanded on 25 April. 39th Divisional HQ moved to Rouen on 5 March and in June its remaining units were gradually disbanded. Divisional HQ closed down on 10 July 1919.

== Order of battle ==
The following formations and units served with the division:

116th Brigade
Originally numbered 121st Bde intended for the 40th Division of the Fifth New Army; renumbered 12 July 1915. The brigade's first commander was Brigadier-General Reginald Barnes. Became staff of embarkation camp, Le Havre, December 1918.

- 11th (Service) Battalion), Royal Sussex Regiment (1st South Down) (left June 1918)
- 12th (Service) Battalion, Royal Sussex Regiment (2nd South Down) (disbanded 8 February 1918)
- 13th (Service) Battalion, Royal Sussex Regiment (3rd South Down) (left June 1918)
- 14th (Service) Battalion, Hampshire Regiment (1st Portsmouth) (disbanded 23 February 1918)
- 1/1st Battalion, Herefordshire Regiment (Territorial Force (TF)) (joined 8 February 1918, left 9 May 1918)
- 1/4th Battalion, East Yorkshire Regiment (TF) (joined as a cadre 15 July 1918, demobilised 7 November 1918)
- 116th Machine Gun Company (formed 18 May 1916, moved to 39th Battalion, Machine Gun Corps (M.G.C.) 14 March 1918)
- 116th Trench Mortar Battery (formed 16 June 1916)

117th Brigade
Formed 21 July 1915. Disbanded on 18 November 1918, but 39th Division took over No 2 Line of Communication Reception Camp (for malarial convalescents) at Martin-Église, which was redesignated 117th Bde on 19 November.

- 16th (Service) Battalion, Sherwood Foresters (Chatsworth Rifles) (left 16 August 1918)
- 17th (Service) Battalion, Sherwood Foresters (Welbeck Rangers) (disbanded 21 February 1918)
- 17th (Service) Battalion, King's Royal Rifle Corps (British Empire League) (left 16 August 1918)
- 16th (Service) Battalion, Rifle Brigade (St Pancras) (left August 1918)
- 117th Machine Gun Company (formed 18 May 1916, moved to 39th Battalion, M.G.C. 14 March 1918)
- 117th Trench Mortar Battery (formed 18 June 1916)

118th Brigade
Formed 21 July 1915. Disbanded 18 November 1918.

- 10th (Service) Battalion, Queen's Own (Royal West Kent Regiment) (Kent County) (left 16 October 1915)
- 11th (Service) Battalion, Queen's Own (Royal West Kent Regiment) (Lewisham) (left 16 October 1915)
- 13th (Service) Battalion (Wandsworth), East Surrey Regiment (remained in England 23 February 1916)
- 20th (Service) Battalion, Middlesex Regiment (Shoreditch) (remained in England 23 February 1916)
- 21st (Service) Battalion, Middlesex Regiment (Islington) (remained in England 23 February 1916)
- 14th (Service) Battalion, Princess Louise's (Argyll and Sutherland Highlanders) (remained in England 23 February 1916)
- 1/6th Battalion, Cheshire Regiment (TF) (joined 29 February 1916, left 28 May 1918)
- 1/4th Battalion, Black Watch (Royal Highlanders) (TF) (joined 29 February 1916, merged with 1/5th Battalion March 1916, became 4th/5th Battalion)
- 1/5th Battalion, Black Watch (Royal Highlanders) (TF) (joined 29 February 1916, merged with 1/4th Battalion March 1916, became 4th/5th Battalion)
- 1/1st Battalion, Cambridgeshire Regiment (TF) (joined 29 February 1916, left 9 May 1918)
- 1/1st) Battalion, Hertfordshire Regiment (TF) (joined 29 February 1916, left 8 April 1918)
- 118th Machine Gun Company, (formed 21 March 1916, moved to 39th Battalion, M.G.C. 14 March 1918)
- 118th Trench Mortar Battery (formed 1 July 1916)

39th Divisional Composite Brigade
Formed 10 April 1918 after the Division suffered heavy losses and placed under command of Brig-Gen. A. Hubback. Fought in the Battles of the Lys as an independent command attached to XXII Corps. Returned to Division and men deployed to old units by 6 May 1918.

- 1st Battalion (formed from remnants of 11th Royal Sussex and 1/1st Hertfordshire)
- 2nd Battalion (formed from remnants of 13th Gloucestershire and 13th Royal Sussex)
- 3rd Battalion (formed from remnants of units of 117th Brigade)
- 4th Battalion (formed from remnants of units 118th Brigade)
- 5th Battalion (formed from remnants of units of all three Brigades)
- 118th Trench Mortar Battery
- No 4 (287th) Company, 39th Divisional Train Army Service Corps (ASC)

197th Brigade
Previously 197th (Lancashire Fusiliers) Brigade of 66th Division; joined 39th Division from Line of Communications 18 November 1918 with eight TCs under command.

39th (Deptford) Divisional Artillery
The whole divisional artillery was raised by the Mayor and Corporation of Deptford; operated as an independent formation after April 1918

- CLXXIV (Deptford) Brigade, Royal Field Artillery (RFA)
- CLXXIX (Deptford) Brigade, RFA (broken up 18 January 1917)
- CLXXXIV (Deptford) Brigade, RFA (broken up 30 November 1916)
- CLXXXVI (Deptford) Howitzer Brigade, RFA
- 39th (Deptford) Divisional Ammunition Column, RFA
- 39th Divisional Trench Mortar Brigade
  - V.39 Heavy Trench Mortar Battery, RFA (formed 27 August 1916; broken up 7 February 1918)
  - X.39, Y.39 and Z.39 Medium Mortar Batteries, R.F.A. (formed 21 March 1916; Z broken up redistributed to X and Y batteries 7 February 1918; X and Y disbanded 15 May 1918)

39th (Stockton on Tees) Divisional Engineers
The Royal Engineers field companies were raised by the Mayor and Town of Stockton-on-Tees in County Durham, and joined on 7 October 1915. The divisional signal company was recruited at Norbury, South London, by the British Empire Committee.

- 225th (Stockton on Tees) Field Company
- 227th (Stockton on Tees) Field Company
- 234th (Stockton on Tees) Company
- 39th Divisional Signals Company (Empire)

39th Divisional Train, Army Service Corps
Companies formed 6 March 1915

- No 1 (HQ) Company (284th Company (Horse Transport), ASC)
- No 2 Company (285th Company (Horse Transport), ASC)
- No 3 Company (286th Company (Horse Transport), ASC)
- No 4 Company (287th Company (Horse Transport), ASC)

Divisional Troops

- 13th (Service) Battalion, Gloucestershire Regiment (Forest of Dean) (divisional pioneers, left as a cadre by 6 May 1918)
- 228th Machine Gun Company (joined 19 July 1917, moved to 39th Battalion M.G.C. 14 March 1918, left 11 September 1918)
- 39th Battalion M.G.C. (formed 14 March 1918, absorbing the brigade MG companies)
- Divisional Mounted Troops
  - E Squadron, South Irish Horse (joined 17 March 1916, left 10 May 1916)
  - 39th Divisional Cyclist Company, Army Cyclist Corps (joined 14 November 1915, left 10 May 1916)
- 50th Mobile Veterinary Section Army Veterinary Corps
- 236th Divisional Employment Company (joined 30 June 1917)
- Royal Army Medical Corps (RAMC)
  - 132nd Field Ambulance
  - 133rd Field Ambulance
  - 134th Field Ambulance
- 82nd Sanitary Section (left 17 April 1917)

Training Cadres
Those directly commanded by 39th Divisional HQ were:

- 23rd (Service) Battalion, Northumberland Fusiliers (Tyneside Scottish) (from 34th Division 17 June; to 197th Brigade (then with 66th Division) 16 August 1918)
- 13th (Service) Battalion, Green Howards (from 40th Division 17 June; to 25th Division 29 June 1918)
- 13th (Service) Battalion, East Surrey Regiment (Wandsworth) (from 40th Division 17 June; to 25th Division 29 June 1918)
- 21st (Service) Battalion, Middlesex Regiment (Islington) (from 40th Division 17 June; to 25th Division 29 June 1918)
- 14th (Service) Battalion, Highland Light Infantry (from 40th Division 17 June; to 197th Brigade 16 August 1918)
- 7th (Robin Hood) Battalion, Sherwood Foresters (TF) (from 59th (2nd North Midland) Division 15 August; to 116th Brigade 16 November 1919)

== General Officers Commanding ==
- Major-General Nathaniel Walter Barnardiston (23 August 1915 – 5 June 1916)
- Brigadier-General George Glas Sandeman Carey (temporary 5 June – 8 June 1916)
- Major-General R. Dawson (8 June – 13 July 1916)
- Major-General Gerald Cuthbert (13 July 1916 – 20 August 1917)
- Major-General Edward Feetham (20 August 1917 – 7 March 1918; 23 March – 29 March 1918 †)
- Brigadier-General George Augustus Stewart Cape (acting 7 March – 18 March 1918 †)
- Brigadier-General Montague Leyland Hornby (acting 18 March – 23 March 1918)
- Brigadier-General William George Thompson (acting 29 March –30 March 1918)
- Major-General Cyril Blacklock (30 March – 30 August 1918)
- Brigadier-General Arthur Benison Hubback (acting 30 August – 10 September 1918)
- Major-General Neill Malcolm (10 September – 27 December 1918)
- Brigadier-General J. H. Hall (27 December 1918 – July 1919)

== See also ==
- List of British divisions in World War I
