= 137th Armoured Brigade =

The 137th Armoured Brigade was an armoured brigade of the British Army that saw active service during the Second World War

== History ==
The brigade was formed from the 137th Infantry Brigade that was serving with the 46th Infantry Division until July 1942 when it was converted into the 137th Armoured Brigade. This was due to a new experiment of 'Mixed Divisions', of two infantry brigade and one tank brigade. However, the 46th Division was re-converted back to a standard infantry division and the brigade came under command of the War Office, and later Eastern Command. However, the brigade was later disbanded on 26 September 1943.

== Commanders ==
- Brigadier W. G. Hewett (until 17 August 1942)
- Brigadier C. H. M. Peto (from 17 August 1942)

== Component Units ==
- 113th Regiment Royal Armoured Corps (from 2/5th Battalion, West Yorkshire Regiment)
- 114th Regiment Royal Armoured Corps (from 2/6th Battalion, Duke of Wellington's Regiment)
- 115th Regiment Royal Armoured Corps (from 2/7th Battalion, Duke of Wellington's Regiment)

== See also ==
- British Armoured formations of World War II
- List of British brigades of the Second World War
