= George Cape =

British Army general

Brigadier-General George Cape CMG
- Born: George Augustus Stewart Cape; 28 March 1867; Lee, Kent, England
- Died: 18 March 1918 (aged 50); France
- Military career
- Allegiance: United Kingdom
- Branch: British Army
- Service years: 1889–1918
- Rank: Brigadier-General
- Unit: Royal Artillery
- Commands: 39th Division, Royal Artillery
- Conflicts: Second Boer War; First World War; Western Front
- Awards: Companion of the Order of St Michael and St George; Mentioned in Despatches (3)

Brigadier-General George Augustus Stewart Cape, CMG (28 March 1867 – 18 March 1918) was a brigadier general in the 39th Division, Royal Artillery of the British Army during the First World War.

== Military career ==
Cape was born in Lee, Kent (now in London), the son of George Augustus Cape, an author and co-founder of the accounting firm Cape & Dalgleish, and Mary Catherine Cape. He was educated at Charterhouse School in Surrey.

Cape was commissioned into the Royal Artillery as a second lieutenant on 13 November 1889, promoted to lieutenant on 13 November 1892, and served in Uganda in 1898, for which he received the East and Central Africa Medal. The following year he was seconded to South Africa where he served on Special Service during the Second Boer War. He was promoted to captain on 9 January 1900.

Cape was appointed a Companion of St Michael and St George in the 1918 New Year Honours for his efforts during the First World War. He died on active service, in France aged 50 and is remembered at a cemetery in Péronne, Somme.
