= Edward Feetham =

British Army officer (1863–1918)

Major-General Edward Feetham CB CMG
- Born: 4 June 1863
- Died: 29 March 1918 (aged 54); Démuin, France
- Burial place: Picquigny British Cemetery
- Education: Marlborough College
- Military career
- Allegiance: United Kingdom
- Branch: British Army
- Service years: 1883–1918
- Rank: Major-general
- Unit: Royal Berkshire Regiment
- Commands: 137th (Staffordshire) Infantry Brigade; 39th Division
- Conflicts: Suakin Expedition; Second Boer War; First World War; German spring offensive †
- Awards: Companion of the Order of the Bath

Major-General Edward Feetham CB CMG (4 June 1863 – 29 March 1918) was a British Army officer who was killed during the First World War whilst commanding the 39th Division, to which he had been promoted to command in August 1917, when promoted to temporary major general.

== Military career ==
His military career began when he was commissioned as a second lieutenant into the Royal Monmouthshire Royal Engineers on 3 April 1881. He transferred as a lieutenant into the Royal Berkshire Regiment on 12 May 1883.

On 27 April 1892 he was promoted from supernumerary lieutenant to lieutenant, then on 1 June to captain, and on 22 May 1894 was appointed as an adjutant. On 8 April 1896 he was appointed as an adjutant of the 1st Volunteer Battalion of the Royal Berkshires, which later became the 4th (Territorial Force) Battalion.

On 14 March 1903 he was promoted to major.

On 30 April 1911 he was promoted to lieutenant colonel and became commanding officer (CO) of the 2nd Battalion, Royal Berkshire Regiment.

In April 1915 he took over the 137th (Staffordshire) Infantry Brigade, part of the 46th (North Midland) Division, and was granted the temporary rank of brigadier general while employed in this position.

He was the eighth of nine British divisional commanders to be killed or die of wounds during the war. (Note: The other fatalities were: Hubert Hamilton, GOC 3rd Division, Samuel Lomax, GOC 1st Division, Thompson Capper, GOC 7th Division, George Thesiger, GOC 9th (Scottish) Division, Frederick Wing, GOC 12th (Eastern) Division, Edward Ingouville-Williams, GOC 34th Division, Robert Broadwood, GOC 57th (2nd West Lancashire) Division, and Louis Lipsett, GOC 4th Division.)
