= 137th Infantry Brigade =

- Active: 1939–1942
- Country: United Kingdom
- Branch: Territorial Army
- Type: Infantry
- Size: Brigade
- Part of: 46th Infantry Division

The 137th Infantry Brigade was an infantry brigade of the British Army that saw active service during the Second World War.

== History ==
The brigade was raised in the summer of 1939 when the Territorial Army was doubled in size in order to meet the threat of Nazi Germany. The brigade was formed as a 2nd Line duplicate of the 147th Infantry Brigade and was assigned to the 46th (West Riding and North Midland) Infantry Division. With the division, the brigade was sent overseas to join the British Expeditionary Force (BEF) in France in April 1940 for training and labour duties. In May, the brigade fought against the German Army in the Battle of France until being evacuated at Dunkirk with the rest of the BEF. After spending the next two years in the United Kingdom on home defence against a German invasion, in July 1942 it was decided to convert the 137th Brigade into an armoured formation. The brigades' infantry battalions were subsequently transferred to the Royal Armoured Corps and the brigade was redesignated 137th Armoured Brigade.

=== Order of battle ===
The composition of the brigade was as follows:

- 2/5th Battalion, West Yorkshire Regiment (became 113th Regiment Royal Armoured Corps)
- 2/6th Battalion, Duke of Wellington's Regiment (became 114th Regiment Royal Armoured Corps)
- 2/7th Battalion, Duke of Wellington's Regiment (became 115th Regiment Royal Armoured Corps)
- 137th Infantry Brigade Anti-Tank Company (formed 12 July 1940, joined 46th Reconnaissance Battalion July 1941)
