= 66th (2nd East Lancashire) Division =

British Army territorial infantry division, active during the First and Second World Wars

2nd East Lancashire Division 66th (2nd East Lancashire) Division
- The divisional insignia used during the First World War
- Active: 1914–19
- Branch: Territorial Force
- Type: Infantry
- Role: Infantry
- Engagements: Third Battle of Ypres: Battle of Poelcappelle; German spring offensive: Battle of St. Quentin; Hundred Days Offensive: Second Battle of Cambrai; Battle of the Selle

Commanders
- Notable commanders: Charles Beckett; Neill Malcolm

The 66th (2nd East Lancashire) Division was an infantry division of the British Army, part of the Territorial Force, which saw service in the trenches of the Western Front, during the later years of the Great War and was disbanded after the war.

The division was created at the end of August 1914, shortly after the outbreak of the First World War as the 2nd East Lancashire Division, a second-line formation of the East Lancashire Division, composed primarily of soldiers from eastern Lancashire and the industrial towns around Manchester. After training and home service, it went to the Western Front in early 1917 and on 9 October, fought at the Battle of Poelcappelle. In March 1918, it suffered extremely heavy losses during Operation Michael the German spring offensive and was withdrawn from the line and reduced to a cadre to be rebuilt. It returned to the front in time for the Battle of Cambrai, part of the Hundred Days Offensive and the Battle of the Selle. Following the Armistice of 11 November 1918, it was stationed in Belgium, where it was demobilised in March 1919. The division was not reformed after the war.

== History ==
=== Formation and home service ===
The division was created at the end of August 1914, as the 2nd East Lancashire Division, a second-line formation of the East Lancashire Division. Territorial Force soldiers could not be deployed overseas without their consent and the Territorial units were accordingly split into a "first line", with men who had volunteered for overseas service and a "second line", which was intended for home service, by the ten per cent who refused to volunteer on 12 August. The second line units also served to absorb the large number of recruits who had joined the Territorial Force following the outbreak of war. The first commander was Brigadier-General Charles Beckett, a 65-year-old retired officer, who had commanded a Yeomanry brigade some years earlier.

As with the original East Lancashire Division, the 2nd East Lancashire was organised in three infantry brigades of four battalions each. These were later numbered as the 197th (Lancashire Fusiliers) Brigade, composed of the 2/5th, 2/6th, 2/7th and 2/8th Lancashire Fusiliers; the 198th (East Lancashire) Brigade, composed of the 2/4th and 2/5th East Lancashire Regiment and the 2/9th and 2/10th Manchester Regiment; and the 199th (Manchester) Brigade, composed of the 2/5th, 2/6th, 2/7th and 2/8th Manchester Regiment. The 197th Brigade drew its men from Bury and Salford, Greater Manchester; the 198th Brigade from Blackburn, Burnley Ashton-under-Lyne and Oldham and the 199th Brigade from Wigan, Manchester and Ardwick. The division also raised second-line Territorial artillery, Royal Army Medical Corps and Royal Engineer units, all from the Lancashire–Manchester recruiting area and had an attached squadron of the Bedfordshire Yeomanry.

For two years, the 2nd East Lancashire Division (numbered the 66th Division in August 1915), provided trained replacements for its parent unit and carried out home defence duties in England. Elements of the division assembled near Southport in late 1914, then moved south to the Kent–Sussex area in May 1915 and to Essex in early 1916. In early 1915, the 2/5th Lancashire Fusiliers, a second-line battalion, was detached for overseas service and joined the 51st (Highland) Division. The battalion was replaced by another duplicate battalion, the 3/5th Lancashire Fusiliers, which became one of the few third-line territorial battalions to see active service. One of the three companies of Royal Engineers, was sent to France in 1915 to join the 48th (South Midland) Division and during 1916, three of the four heavy and howitzer artillery batteries were withdrawn or broken up. Following the Military Service Act of January 1916, all Territorial soldiers were deemed liable for overseas service and in February 1917, the 66th Division was instructed to prepare for a move to continental Europe and received a new and experienced commander, Major-General Herbert Lawrence.

=== Flanders and Poelcappelle, 1917 ===
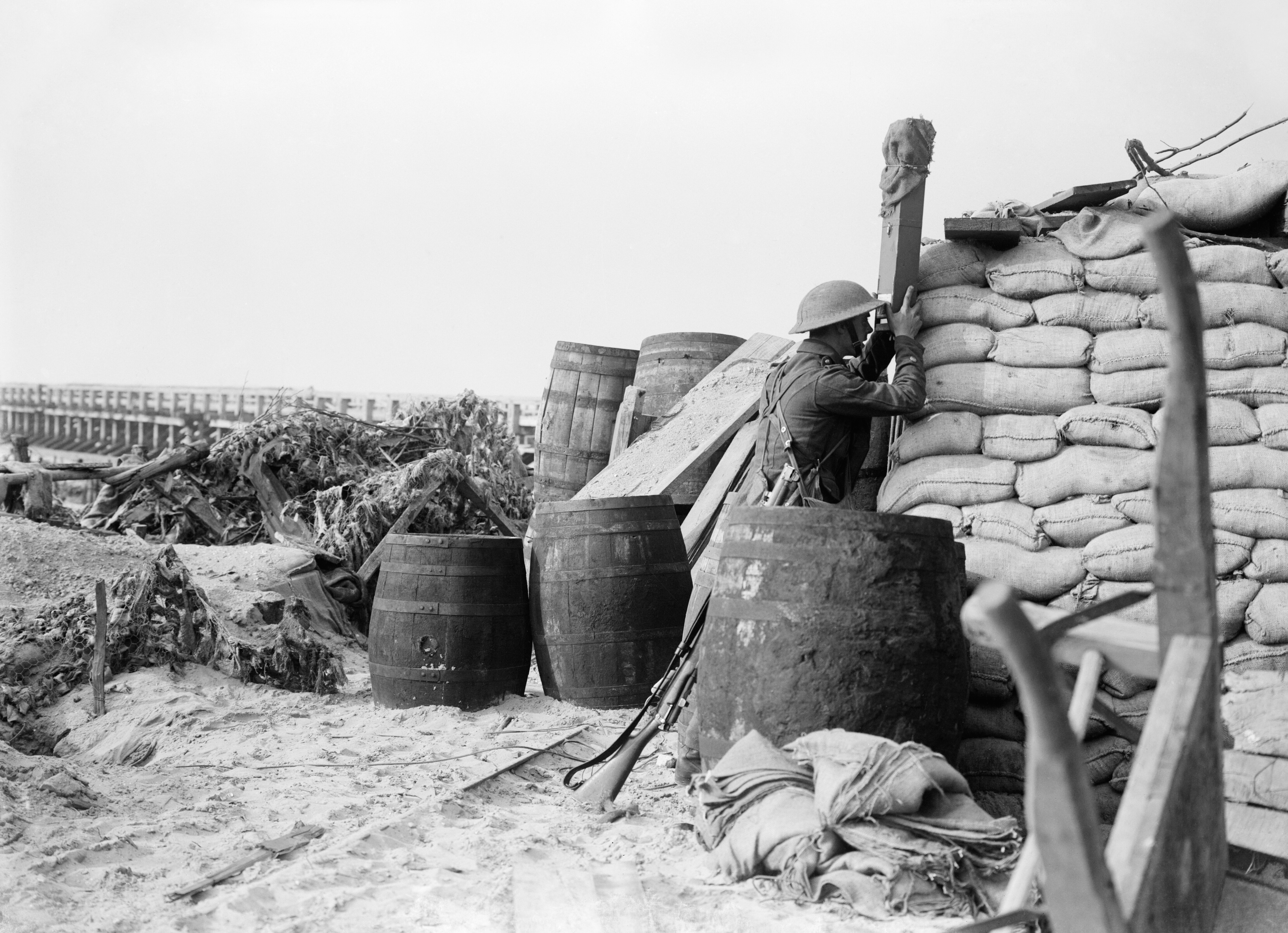
An observer from the 2/4th East Lancashire Regiment at the extreme left of the British front line in September 1917, manning a position on the Belgian coast at Nieuwpoort.

The division arrived in France in early 1917 as part of the last batch of second-line Territorial divisions to be sent from Britain, and was attached to the First Army. On 12 April, Brigadier-General Godfrey Matthews, a former Royal Marine officer commanding 198th Brigade, was wounded by shellfire and died the next day. In June, the division was transferred to the XV Corps of the Fourth Army on the relatively quiet coastal sector in Flanders. During the summer, XV Corps was held ready for Operation Hush, an amphibious landing by the 1st Division and a coastal offensive by the rest of XV Corps, which was planned to support an advance from Passchendaele Ridge east of Ypres, by the Fifth Army. The operation was postponed several times and was cancelled in October. At the end of September, the 66th Division was relieved by its parent unit, the 42nd (East Lancashire) Division. After a few days of overlap, where many men were able to meet friends and relations they had not seen since 1914, the division moved south to the Ypres area. The division was assigned to II Anzac Corps, a predominantly Australian formation and the 199th Brigade moved into the front line to replace the 3rd Australian Division on 5 October. The relief was badly mismanaged, leaving the Australian staff officers doubtful of the efficiency of the division. On 9 October, the division made its debut in the Battle of Poelcappelle.

On the night of 8/9 October, the 197th and 198th brigades had begun to cover the 2.5 miles (4.0 km) to the front line, which usually took about 1 1/2 hours. Despite starting ten hours before the attack, the 197th Brigade was late. At zero hour, the 198th Brigade attacked on the left flank of the divisional front, into defences which had been little damaged by the artillery bombardment, advancing behind a meagre creeping barrage and were held up 300 yards (270 m) short of the first objective. The 197th Brigade arrived late on the right flank, exhausted and disorganised after a twelve-hour march through mud but attacked as soon as it arrived. The brigade rapidly advanced over drier sandy ground and reached the final objective, 700 yards (640 m) short of Passchendaele village at 10:00 a.m.; an officer's patrol entered the village and found it empty. Around midday, the 197th Brigade battalions near the village withdrew their flanks, to gain touch with the units on either side at the first objective; the troops in the centre misinterpreted this and also withdrew the same distance. A German counter-attack was repulsed at 5:10 p.m. and before nightfall, the divisional commander ordered a short withdrawal, to link with the 49th Division on the left and to avoid enfilade fire from the Bellevue Spur. The brigade ended the day 500 yards (460 m) beyond the start line for the loss of 3,119 casualties; the division was relieved by the 3rd Australian Division on the night of 10/11 October.

A second senior officer was killed in action, when Brigadier-General Arthur Lowe, commanding the divisional artillery, was killed near Ypres on 24 November. In late December 1917, a new commanding officer, Major-General Neill Malcolm was appointed to the 66th Division. Malcolm was a decorated veteran of several colonial wars, who had served in staff posts since being wounded in the Second Boer War and had most recently served as chief of staff of the Fifth Army. The division was reorganised over the winter, with the brigade machine-gun companies being consolidated into a battalion and a pioneer battalion, the 1/5th Border Regiment joining the division. The most substantial change was the loss of three battalions, the 3/5th Lancashire Fusiliers and 2/8th and 2/10th Manchester Regiment, one from each brigade. This was a change made in all British divisions, to bring the remaining battalions in France up to strength and to increase the ratio of artillery to infantry. At this point, there was a general exchange of men between the 42nd and 66th Divisions; the core of the 1/6th Lancashire Fusiliers, 1/4th East Lancashires, and 1/9th Manchesters were transferred to the 66th Division, where they amalgamated with their second-line counterparts, while the 42nd Division received the men from the disbanded battalions in the 66th Division. The division remained in the Passchendaele area until February 1918.

=== Battle of St. Quentin ===
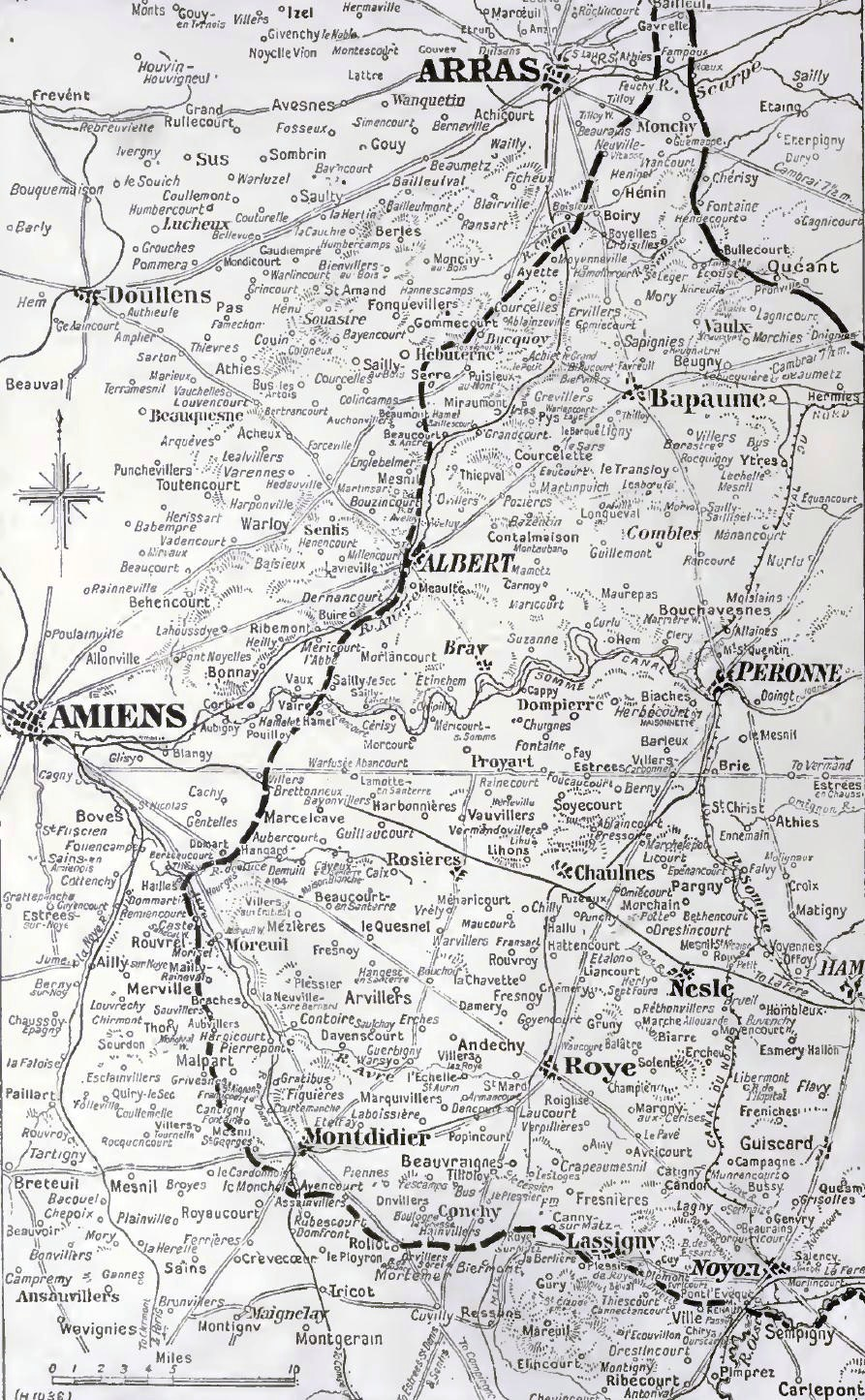
Map of the German spring offensive; over ten days, the 66th Division retreated from east of Peronne, off the centre right of the map, to outside Amiens, on the centre left.

In March 1918, the 66th Division was assigned to XIX Corps in the Fifth Army, holding an area north of Saint-Quentin, bordering the 24th Division of XIX Corps on the right and 16th (Irish) Division of VII Corps on the left. The corps sector was between the River Cologne in the north and the Omicron in the south. Under a new defence in depth scheme, small strongpoints in a "forward zone" was to delay and disrupt an attack, harassing it with machine-gun fire. The main body of the division remained in a "battle zone" further back, to make local counter-attacks into the forward zone or in reserve in a third "rear zone". The British were used to deliberate attacks in trench warfare conditions, not the rapid counter-attacks on the defensive that the German army had perfected since early 1915 and felt vulnerable in what they saw as exposed positions. Combat units were still kept too close to the front line (across the front, 84 per cent of battalions were in the two forward zones), leaving them vulnerable to an attack and a lack of manpower meant that very few of the defensive positions necessary for the scheme to work had been prepared in the rear zone of the Fifth Army.

On the morning of 21 March, the German spring offensive began at the Battle of St. Quentin. Elements of the German 25th Division and 208th Division attacked through a thick fog at dawn, overrunning the two battalions (4th East Lancashires and 2/8th Lancashire Fusiliers) which held positions in the forward zone. By 10.30 am, they had reached the "battle zone", where the fighting intensified. On the right flank, near the boundary with 24th Division, a reserve company of 2/7th Manchesters held a defensive position from 11:00 am to 7:00 pm, when they surrendered, having lost 70 per cent casualties and run out of ammunition. To their left, the 2/6th Manchesters held out until the early afternoon, when the 160 survivors were forced to retreat further into the battle zone. The northern element of the division's defensive plan was a fortified quarry outside the village of Templeux-le-Guérard, held by the 2/7th Lancashire Fusiliers and 1/5th Border Regiment but this had been quickly surrounded and bypassed by the attackers, to be mopped up later in the day, with only a few men escaping. The village was defended by the 2/6th Lancashire Fusiliers and an artillery battery; in the course of the day, the battery was destroyed while the fusiliers were pushed back towards the edge of the village, clinging on to their positions as night fell. During the day, 711 men of 66th Division had been killed; while detailed figures are not available this would suggest around 1,000 men were wounded and another 2,000 captured. British casualties for the day were 7,500 killed, 10,000 wounded and 21,000 captured; 66th Division is known to have lost 711 men killed.

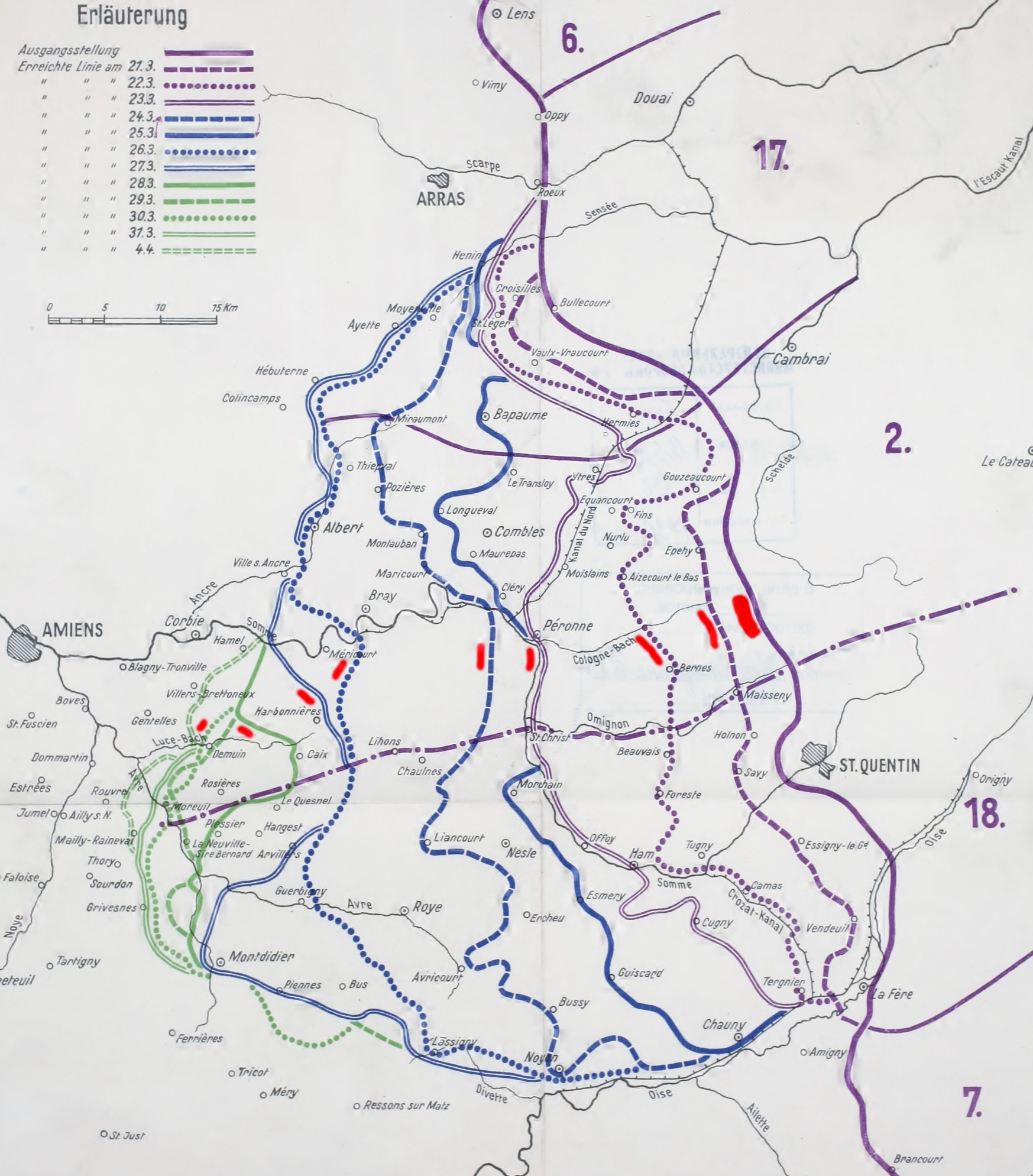
German situation map of the Spring Offensive, covering 21 March to 4 April 1918. The lines show the position of the advance at nightfall each day; the approximate position of the 66th Division has been marked in red until the end of March.

On the morning of 22 March, German attacks continued to push back the remaining units of the 66th Division, now supported by the 1st Cavalry Division and a handful of tanks. The composite force managed a fighting retreat, with most units avoiding encirclement. Shortly after noon the remnants of the division were ordered to retreat behind the 50th (Northumbrian) Division, which were preparing fresh defences on the original Green Line along the edge of the rear zone. The 66th Division retreated through the new defensive line by 4:00 pm, with the aid of the 5th Durham Light Infantry (DLI), which had been temporarily transferred to support them and the 50th Division took over the front line. Over the following days, the divisions of XIX Corps fell back towards the line of the River Somme, where the 66th Division (plus the 5th DLI) took up positions on the west bank of the river around Barleux and Foucaucourt-en-Santerre, west of Peronne. On 24 March, the German army crossed the Somme and the 2/8th Lancashire Fusiliers counter-attacked the bridgeheads without success but continued to hold a line close to the river. Expecting a follow-up attack the next day, 149th Brigade was temporarily attached to 66th Division and both units were slowly pushed back from the banks of the Somme, withdrawing to Assevillers as night fell on 25 March.

The remnants of the 66th Division were holding a position south of the Somme, with the 50th Division to the right and troops from the Third Army over the river to the left. An attack on the morning of 26 March, opening the Battle of Rosières, pushed back the units on the north bank and the 66th Division retired, losing contact with the 50th Division, which fell back on Rosières-en-Santerre to avoid being flanked. "Little's Composite Battalion" with the remaining troops of the 198th Brigade, moved from reserve to Foucaucourt and defended the village until the early afternoon, retired to Framercourt and then filled a 3,000-yard (2,700 m) gap between the 66th and 39th divisions. The battalion had been formed from stragglers and reinforcement drafts by Lieutenant-Colonel W. B. Little, commander of 1/5th Borders, who had been on leave when the German offensive began and moved up towards the front line during 25 March. Other British troops were north of the 66th Division around Vauvilliers and by that night, the line south of the Somme was held by 16th, 39th, 66th and 50th divisions. The battle continued on 27 March, with the 66th Division pushed back to Harbonniers. That night, the division took up positions between Wiencourt and Guillaucourt, facing north on a line of about 1 mile (1.6 km). The three brigade headquarters had moved forward to reinforce the front line; until the 66th Division was reorganised later in the year, casualties were so numerous that the brigade structure was not reformed and the brigadiers took turns to command the infantry. On the morning of 28 March, a German attack broke through at Guillaucourt and the 66th Division retreated south to Cayeux-en-Santerre, with the 39th Division on the left. By nightfall, the line had been pushed back to Ignaucourt, a few miles from Amiens.

Elements of the division remained in the fighting line as late as 30 March, when they fought in a counter-attack near Aubercourt under the command of one of the 66th Division brigadiers. The division was relieved by part of the 18th Division on the night of 30/31 March. After ten days' fighting, only 2,500 men remained in the division and it had almost ceased to function as an organised unit. Two of the three infantry brigades and eight of the twelve infantry battalions had lost their commanders and the front-line strength was reduced to 1,200 riflemen, fewer than a company per battalion. A proposal to disband the division was discussed in the first week of April but quickly rejected. On 29 March, near Vauchelles-lès-Domart, Malcolm had been badly wounded in his good leg (he was lame in the other, following an injury in South Africa) and left the division to recover, command being taken temporarily by Brigadier-General A. J. Hunter. On 31 March, Hugh Keppel Bethell, who had commanded the New Army 74th Brigade in the 25th Division since October 1916, was promoted to take over the division. At 35, Bethell became the youngest man to command a division during the war; while a temporary Major-General, he still held the substantive rank of captain.

A driven and mercurial figure, Bethell inspired both admiration and loathing from his contemporaries, who saw him as an outstanding commander but with a furious and often unjustified, temper. During his time at 74th Brigade, relations with his staff had diminished to the point where they refused to take meals with him. He also believed in commandeering from other units and after leaving 25th Division, he repeatedly returned to poach staff officers and battalion commanders. The 74th Brigade would later provide the new divisional GSO.2, Walter Guinness (transferred after Bethell's intervention to the Chief of Staff at army headquarters) and the GSO.3, John Marriott (simply taken by Bethell from hospital). This approach extended to reorganising his new command. On 2 April, Bethell sent Gordon Macready, the divisional GSO.1, to acquire several hundred guns in order to reform the 66th Division as a machine-gun division, an idea that appears to have been entirely Bethell's own. After raiding other divisions and emptying the Machine Gun Corps training school, Bethell reported to Field Marshal Sir Douglas Haig, Commander-in-Chief (C-in-C) of the British Expeditionary Force (BEF) on the Western Front that the division was ready to return to combat; he was surprised to find that his friend "Duggie" disapproved of these methods, rejected the proposal and informed him that his division would instead be withdrawn and used as a training unit. Bethell was later offered a new division but chose to remain in the 66th Division, hoping that it would return to the front lines at a later date.

=== Reconstitution ===
Following its losses, the 66th Division was reduced to cadre early in May; which meant that infantry battalions were cut to ten officers and about 45 men, the surplus being sent to base depots; the artillery, engineer and machine-gun units were distributed among other formations. The divisional artillery was attached to XIX Corps during the Battle of the Avre on 4 April and with XI Corps at the Battle of the Lys later in the month. During the summer, Bethell continued planning for the rebuilding of the division, having recruited a staff he felt he could work with, expecting that experienced men would become available as drafts returned from the Mediterranean. Overseas divisions there had suffered fewer casualties and the reduction from four to three battalions per brigade meant that large numbers of men would be returning. While reinforcements were assembled, the divisional cadres of the 66th Division and the 39th Division were used to train five American divisions in the British zone. The training process was complicated by a rigid schedule laid down by the American high command, who strongly objected to any deviation from their plans. In July, the American divisions moved up to the front and British troops began to arrive from Salonika and Palestine, though the assembly of the division was delayed by the returning men being given home leave and having to spend time acclimatising.

The division had a complicated organisational history during this period, with a large number of units being attached or withdrawn for short periods, while others were merged or disbanded. About thirty infantry battalions were attached for short periods and the divisional artillery and supply columns remained in support of the front line, while one ambulance company was later transferred to serve with the American 27th Division. The future of the division was again in doubt by early September; the 197th Brigade had been transferred to a training role and the division was expected to be disbanded. Bethell argued for retaining the division and was ordered to prepare it for front-line service; the 197th Brigade was replaced by the South African Brigade to bring the division back up to strength. By the end of September, following amalgamations and reorganisation, the division was left with the South African Brigade (1st, 2nd, and 4th South African Infantry regiments), the 198th Brigade (5th Royal Inniskilling Fusiliers, 6th Royal Dublin Fusiliers and 6th Lancashire Fusiliers) and the 199th Brigade, with the 9th Manchester Regiment, 5th Connaught Rangers and 18th King's (Liverpool Regiment). The divisional pioneers were the 9th Gloucestershire Regiment. Less than a year and a half after arriving in France, the division retained only the 6th Lancashire and 9th Manchester of its twelve original battalions and both of these had been amalgamated with other units from the 42nd Division.

=== Hundred Days Offensive ===
The division reached the forward areas on 27 September, under the command of XIII Corps, the reserve corps of the Fourth Army and moved into the line on 5 October, relieving the 25th Division. The division attacked at dawn on 8 October, in the opening phase of the Second Battle of Cambrai and captured the village of Serain by nightfall against determined resistance. After this breakthrough, the division moved forward 14 miles (23 km) in three days, with patrols of the Connaught Rangers entering the outskirts of Le Cateau on 10 October. On the night of 16 October, the divisional pioneers and engineers bridged the Selle and the South African Brigade crossed in thick fog to capture Le Cateau, in a costly attack. The river crossing was the opening stage of the Battle of the Selle (17–25 October), the final advance into Germany.

The division was withdrawn for a short rest, moving back into the line on 2 November. From this point onwards the 66th Division moved almost continually, in close pursuit of the retreating German army. It supported the 25th Division at the Battle of the Sambre on 4 November and on 7 November leapfrogged past the 25th Division to advance as one of the leading units of the Fourth Army. Supplies ran short and the supply services struggled to bring up sufficient food and ammunition over cratered roads and wrecked bridges and the main British advance was forced to halt. On 9 November, to maintain the pursuit, the Fourth Army improvised "Bethell's Force", consisting of 5th Cavalry Brigade, the South African Brigade and two RAF squadrons, along with various support units from 66th Division. It began pushing forward on 10 November and advanced several miles along a broad front, with a second advance on 11 November, only stopped at the last minute by the divisional staff, who had received warning that the armistice would begin at 11 am.

At the Armistice of 11 November 1918, Bethell's Force had reached the Sivry–Beaumont area. From 27 September to 12 November the division had incurred 2,195 casualties, and during the Hundred Days offensive was one of only two Allied divisions to succeed in every attack. The 66th Division was ordered to move north to secure eastern Belgium. On 18 November, it began to move north into the Namur region, where it was stationed between Huy and Rochefort. The division remained there while it demobilised and was disbanded on 24 March 1919. Bethell remained in Germany as Colonel-Commandant of the 2nd Rhine Brigade, headquartered at Wiesbaden.

== General officers commanding ==
Appointed	General officer commanding (GOC)
6 November 1914	Brigadier-General Charles Beckett
14 November 1915	Major-General C J Blomfield
10 February 1916	Colonel C S Gordon Steward	(acting GOC)
1 March 1916	Major-General C J Blomfield
12 February 1917	Major-General the Honorable Herbert Lawrence
22 December 1917	Major-General Neill Malcolm	(wounded in action 29 March 1918)
29 March 1918	Brigadier-General A J Hunter	(acting GOC)
31 March 1918	Major-General Hugh Bethell

== Order of battle ==
2nd East Lancashire Division (November 1915)

2nd Lancashire Fusiliers Brigade

- 3/5th Battalion, Lancashire Fusiliers
- 2/6th Battalion, Lancashire Fusiliers
- 2/7th Battalion, Lancashire Fusiliers
- 2/8th Battalion, Lancashire Fusiliers

2nd East Lancashire Brigade

- 2/4th Battalion, East Lancashire Regiment
- 2/5th Battalion, East Lancashire Regiment
- 2/9th Battalion, Manchester Regiment
- 2/10th Battalion, Manchester Regiment

2nd Manchester Brigade

- 2/5th Battalion, Manchester Regiment
- 2/6th Battalion, Manchester Regiment
- 2/7th Battalion, Manchester Regiment
- 2/8th (Ardwick) Battalion, Manchester Regiment

2nd East Lancashire Divisional Artillery

- Royal Field Artillery
  - 2/I East Lancashire Brigade and Ammunition Column
  - 2/II East Lancashire Brigade and Ammunition Column
  - 2/III East Lancashire Brigade and Ammunition Column
  - 2/IV East Lancashire (Howitzer) Brigade and Ammunition Column
  - 2nd East Lancashire Divisional Ammunition Column
- Royal Garrison Artillery
  - 1/2nd Lancashire Heavy Battery
  - 2/1st Lancashire Heavy Battery
  - 2/2nd Lancashire Heavy Battery

2nd East Lancashire Divisional Royal Engineers

- 2/1st East Lancashire Field Company, Royal Engineers
- 2/2nd East Lancashire Field Company, RE
- 66th (2nd East Lancashire) Divisional Signal Company, Royal Engineers

Royal Army Medical Corps

- 2/1st East Lancashire Field Ambulance
- 2/2nd East Lancashire Field Ambulance
- 2/3rd East Lancashire Field Ambulance

Divisional Train, Army Service Corps

- 541st Company
- 542nd Company
- 543rd Company
- 544th Company

Other

- 66th Divisional Cyclist Company

66th (2nd East Lancashire) Division (June 1917)

197th (Lancashire Fusiliers) Brigade

- 2/6th Battalion, Lancashire Fusiliers
- 2/7th Battalion, Lancashire Fusiliers
- 2/8th Battalion, Lancashire Fusiliers
- 3/5th Battalion, Lancashire Fusiliers
- 202nd Machine Gun Company
- 197th Trench Mortar Battery

198th (East Lancashire) Brigade

- 2/4th Battalion, East Lancashire Regiment
- 2/5th Battalion, East Lancashire Regiment
- 2/9th Battalion, Manchester Regiment
- 2/10th Battalion, Manchester Regiment
- 203rd Machine Gun Company
- 198th Trench Mortar Battery

199th (Manchester) Brigade

- 2/5th Battalion, Manchester Regiment
- 2/6th Battalion, Manchester Regiment
- 2/7th Battalion, Manchester Regiment
- 2/8th (Ardwick) Battalion, Manchester Regiment
- 204th Machine Gun Company
- 199th Trench Mortar Battery

66th (2nd East Lancashire) Divisional artillery

- Royal Field Artillery
  - CCCXXX (2/I East Lancashire) Brigade
  - CCCXXXI (2/II East Lancashire) Brigade
  - 66th Divisional Ammunition Column
- Royal Garrison Artillery
  - 2/1st London Heavy Battery
  - 2/2nd London Heavy Battery
- Trench Mortars
  - V.66 Heavy Trench Mortar Battery
  - X.66 Medium Mortar Battery
  - Y.66 Medium Mortar Battery
  - Z.66 Medium Mortar Battery

66th (2nd East Lancashire) Divisional Engineers

- 430th (2/1st East Lancashire) Field Company
- 431st (2/2nd East Lancashire) Field Company
- 432nd (2/3rd East Lancashire) Field Company
- 66th (2nd East Lancashire) Divisional Signal Company

Royal Army Medical Corps

- 2/1st East Lancashire Field Ambulance
- 2/2nd East Lancashire Field Ambulance
- 2/3rd East Lancashire Field Ambulance

Pioneers

- 10th Battalion, Duke of Cornwall's Light Infantry (from June 1917)

Divisional Train, Army Service Corps

- 541st Company
- 542nd Company
- 543rd Company
- 544th Company

Other

- 1/1 East Lancs Mobile Veterinary Section
- 254th Divisional Employment Company

66th (2nd East Lancashire) Division (September 1918)

198th (East Lancashire) Brigade

- 5th Battalion, Royal Inniskilling Fusiliers
- 6th Battalion, Royal Dublin Fusiliers
- 6th Battalion, Lancashire Fusiliers
- 198th Trench Mortar Battery

199th (Manchester) Brigade

- 9th Battalion, Manchester Regiment
- 5th Battalion, Connaught Rangers
- 18th Battalion, King's (Liverpool Regiment)
- 199th Trench Mortar Battery

South African Brigade

- 1st Regiment, South African Infantry
- 2nd Regiment, South African Infantry
- 4th Regiment, South African Infantry
- South African Trench Mortar Battery

66th (2nd East Lancashire) Divisional Artillery

- Royal Field Artillery
  - CCCXXX (2/I East Lancashire) Brigade
  - CCCXXXI (2/II East Lancashire) Brigade
- 66th Divisional Ammunition Column

66th (2nd East Lancashire) Divisional Engineers

- 430th (2/1st East Lancashire) Field Company
- 431st (2/2nd East Lancashire) Field Company
- 432nd (2/3rd East Lancashire) Field Company
- 66th (2nd East Lancashire) Divisional Signal Company

Royal Army Medical Corps

- 2/2nd East Lancashire Field Ambulance
- 2/3rd East Lancashire Field Ambulance
- South African Field Ambulance

Pioneers

- 9th Battalion, Gloucestershire Regiment

Machine Gun Units

- 100th (Warwickshire & South Nottinghamshire Yeomanry) Battalion Machine Gun Corps

Divisional Train, Army Service Corps

- 541st Company
- 542nd Company
- 543rd Company
- 544th Company

Other

- 1/1 East Lancs Mobile Veterinary Section
- 254th Divisional Employment Company

== See also ==
- List of British divisions in World War I
