= Keppel Bethell =

British Army officer

Major-General Sir Keppel Bethell KBE CB CMG CVO DSO
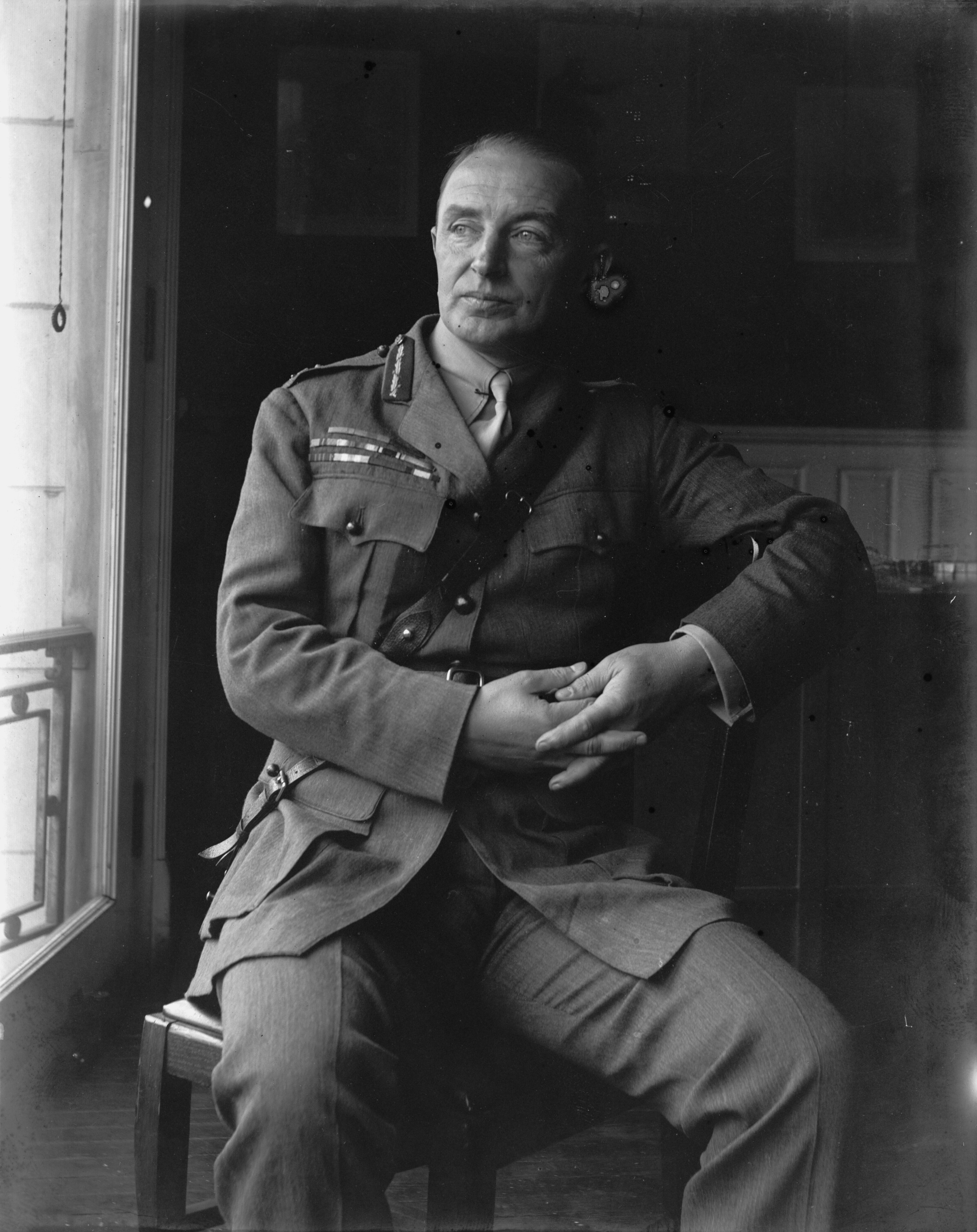
- Portrait of Bethell, c. 1918–1921
- Born: 10 December 1882; Quidenham, Norfolk, England
- Died: 1947 (aged 64–65)
- Military career
- Allegiance: United Kingdom
- Branch: British Army
- Service years: 1902–1934
- Rank: Major-General
- Units: Royal Garrison Artillery; Northamptonshire Regiment
- Commands: 1st Battalion, Northamptonshire Regiment; 74th Brigade; 66th (2nd East Lancashire) Division; 2nd Rhine Brigade; Presidency and Assam District
- Conflicts: First World War
- Awards: Knight Commander of the Order of the British Empire; Companion of the Order of the Bath; Companion of the Order of St Michael and St George; Commander of the Royal Victorian Order; Distinguished Service Order

Major-General Sir Hugh Keppel Bethell, KBE, CB, CMG, CVO, DSO (1882–1947) was a senior British Army officer.

== Military career ==
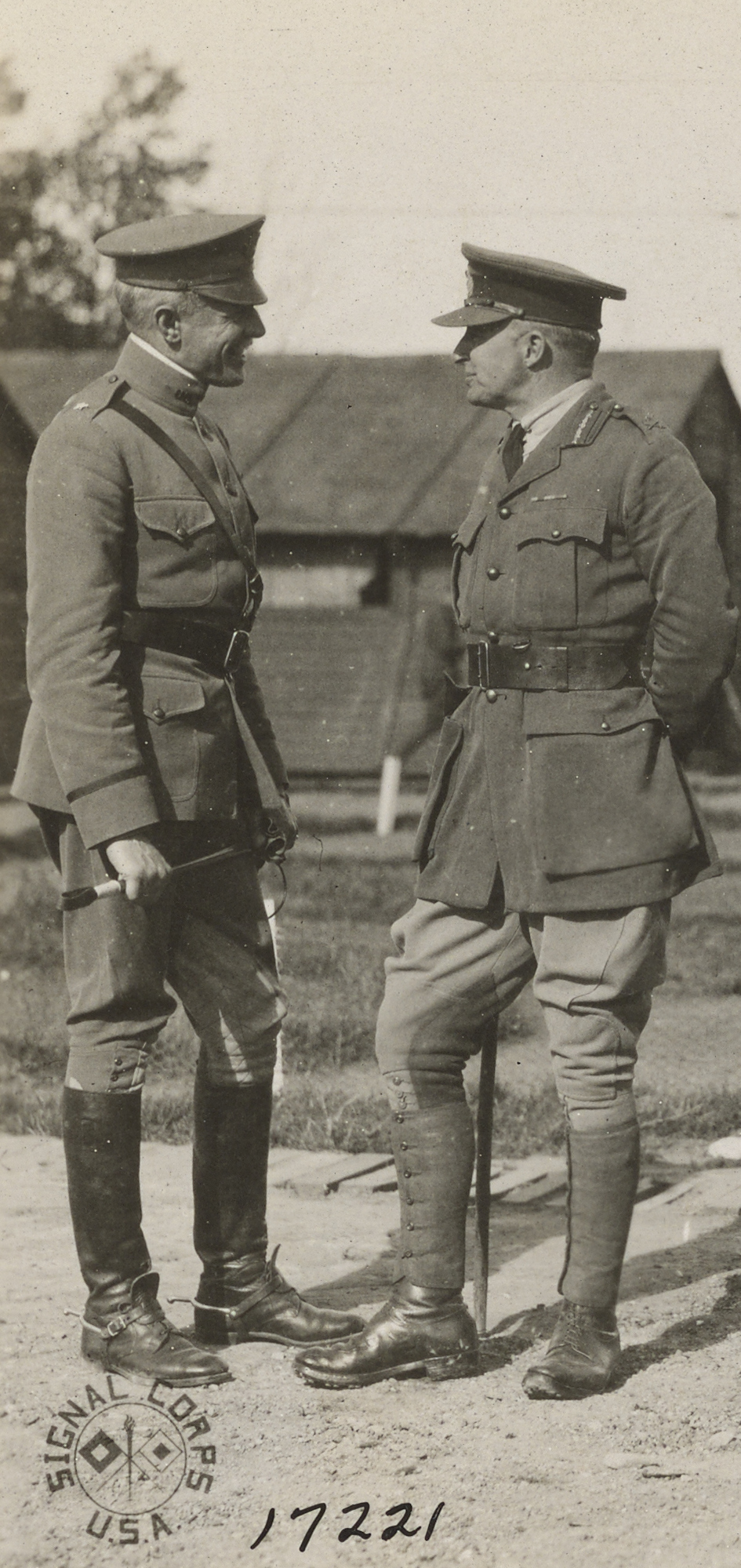
Engaged in conversation with Major General William Wright Harts of the United States Army is Major-General H. Keppel Bethell, GOC 66th Division, pictured here at Fruges, France, 18 July 1918.

Bethell was the eldest son of Col. Edward Bethell DSO CMG and his wife Gertrude, the daughter of Major General Eustace Hill. Educated at Charterhouse School and the Royal Military Academy, Woolwich, Bethell was commissioned into the Royal Garrison Artillery on 24 December 1902.

Seeing active service during the First World War, he became commanding officer of the 1st Battalion, the Northamptonshire Regiment on the Western Front in late 1915, commander of the 74th Brigade in late 1916 and General Officer Commanding 66th (2nd East Lancashire) Division in March 1918. Aged just 36, he was the youngest British divisional commander of the 20th century.

After the war, and after being promoted to brevet colonel in January 1919, and on 2 June to colonel, he became military attaché to Washington, D.C. in 1919, commander of the 2nd Rhine Brigade in April 1924 and brigadier on the general staff at Northern Command in India in April 1928. Promoted in June 1930 to substantive major general, his last appointment was as GOC Presidency and Assam District in India in December 1930 before retiring in December 1934. Following his retirement he was appointed a Knight Commander of the Order of the British Empire in the 1935 Birthday Honours.

Military offices
Preceded by Neill Malcolm	GOC 66th (2nd East Lancashire) Division; 1918–1919	Post disbanded
