= Assevillers New British Cemetery =

WWI CWGC cemetery in Somme, France

Assevillers New British Commonwealth War Graves Commission Cemetery
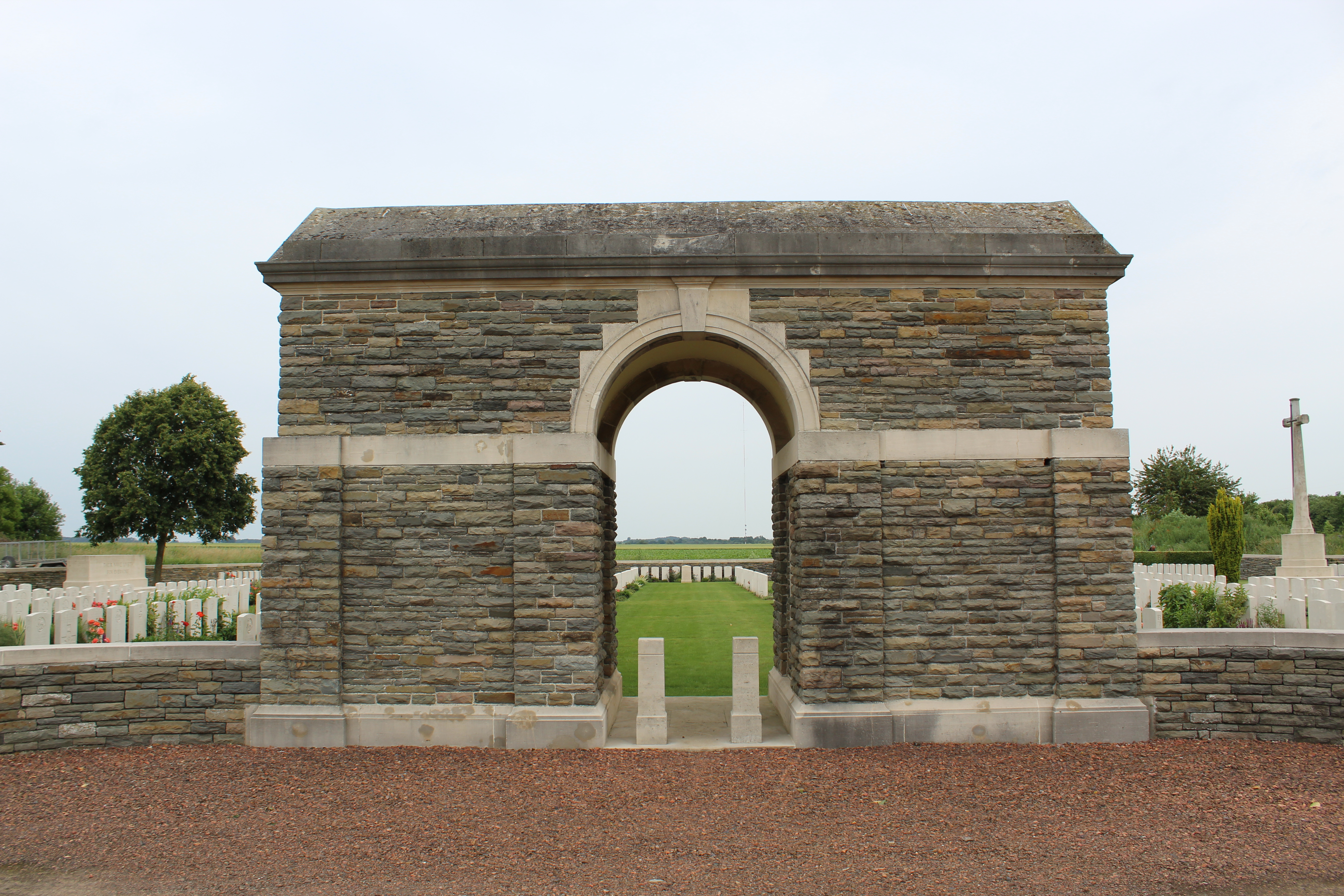
- Arch at Assevillers New British Cemetery

Details
- Established: 1918
- Location: Somme, France
- Country: United Kingdom
- Coordinates: 49°53′48″N 2°50′33″E
- Type: Military
- Owned by: Commonwealth War Graves Commission (CWGC)
- Size: 2,655 sq meters
- No. of graves: 815 total, 320+ unidentified
- Website: Official website
- Footnotes: Designed by Sir Edwin Lutyens & William Harrison Cowlishaw

The Assevillers New British Cemetery is a cemetery located in the Somme region of France commemorating British and Commonwealth soldiers who fought in the Battle of the Somme in World War I. The cemetery contains soldiers who died on a variety of dates in several battles near the village of Assevillers.

== Location ==
The Assevillers New British Cemetery is located at the entrance of Assevillers, a village approximately 10 kilometers southwest of Peronne.

== Capture of Assevillers ==
Assevillers was taken by the French in late 1916. It was evacuated by the Fifth Army on 26 March 1918 during a German counterattack and retaken by the 5th Australian Division on 28 August of the same year.

== Establishment ==
=== History ===
The Assevillers cemetery was created after the Armistice agreements of 1918. A special memorial records the names of 11 British soldiers whose graves were destroyed by artillery fire.

=== Former burial sites moved to Assevillers ===
Former burial sites of soldiers now buried in Assevillers New British Cemetery include:

- Barleux German Cemetery was located about 365 metres northeast of the village of Barleux. Ten Australian soldiers were buried there in August and September 1918.
- Bouchavesnes (Peronne Road) German Cemetery was located between Marrieres Wood and Bouchavesnes. Seven South African and three British soldiers were buried there by the Germans in March 1918. The South African Brigade was annihilated at Marrieres Wood on 24 March 1918.
- Estrees-Deniecourt German Cemetery was located between the villages of Estrees and Fay. Two Australian soldiers were buried there by the Germans.
- Foucaucourt French Military Cemetery was located in the southwest corner of Assevillers, where four soldiers from the United Kingdom were buried in 1915 and 1917.
- The Highway Cemetery, Cappy was a French military cemetery midway between the villages of Cappy and Herbecourt, where six men of the R.H.A. and one Australian soldier were buried in August and September 1918.
- Hyencourt-Le-Grand German Cemetery was begun by the 61st Infantry Regiment on the Chaulnes-Marchelepot road. Two R.A.F. officers were buried there in May 1918.
- Kiboko Wood Cemetery, Biaches was located by a small copse between Biaches and Flaucourt. 30 British soldiers were buried there by the 40th Division in February and March 1917. All but one of the soldiers belonged to the Royal Warwicks. Twenty belonged to the 1st/6th Battalion.
- Misery Chateau German Cemetery contains 16 British soldiers buried by a German field hospital in March 1918.
- P.C. Hedevaux French Military Cemetery, located 548 metres South of Belloy-en-Santerre, contains ten British soldiers who were buried in February and March 1917. (P.C. means Poste de Commandement.)
- Plantation Cemetery was a French military cemetery in the large orchard 914 metres east of Cappy. One British soldier was buried there in February 1917 and four Australians were buried there in August and September 1918.
- Vauvillers Communal Cemetery contained four British soldiers who were buried in March 1918.
- Vermandovillers French Military Cemetery, located in the west side of Assevillers, contained two British soldiers buried in March 1917.

=== Statistics ===
The cemetery covers an area of 2655 square meters and is surrounded by a stone rubble wall.

Graves by Nationality
Nationality	Number of Graves
British	684
Australian	111
South African	16
Canadian	3
French	1
Total	815
