= Neill Malcolm =

British Army general (1869–1953)

Major-General Sir Neill Malcolm KCB DSO
- Born: 8 October 1869; London, United Kingdom
- Died: 21 December 1953 (aged 84); London, United Kingdom
- Military career
- Allegiance: United Kingdom
- Branch: British Army
- Service years: 1889–1924
- Rank: Major-General
- Commands: 66th Division; 39th Division; 30th Division; Troops in the Straits Settlements
- Conflicts: Second Boer War; First World War
- Awards: Knight Commander of the Order of the Bath; Distinguished Service Order

Major-General Sir Neill Malcolm, KCB, DSO (8 October 1869 – 21 December 1953) was a British Army officer who served as Chief of Staff to Fifth Army in the First World War and later commanded the Troops in the Straits Settlements.

After retiring from the British Army, from 1926 to 1946 Malcolm was President of the North Borneo Chartered Company, which controlled North Borneo. He was also High Commissioner for German refugees from 1936 to 1938.

== Military career ==
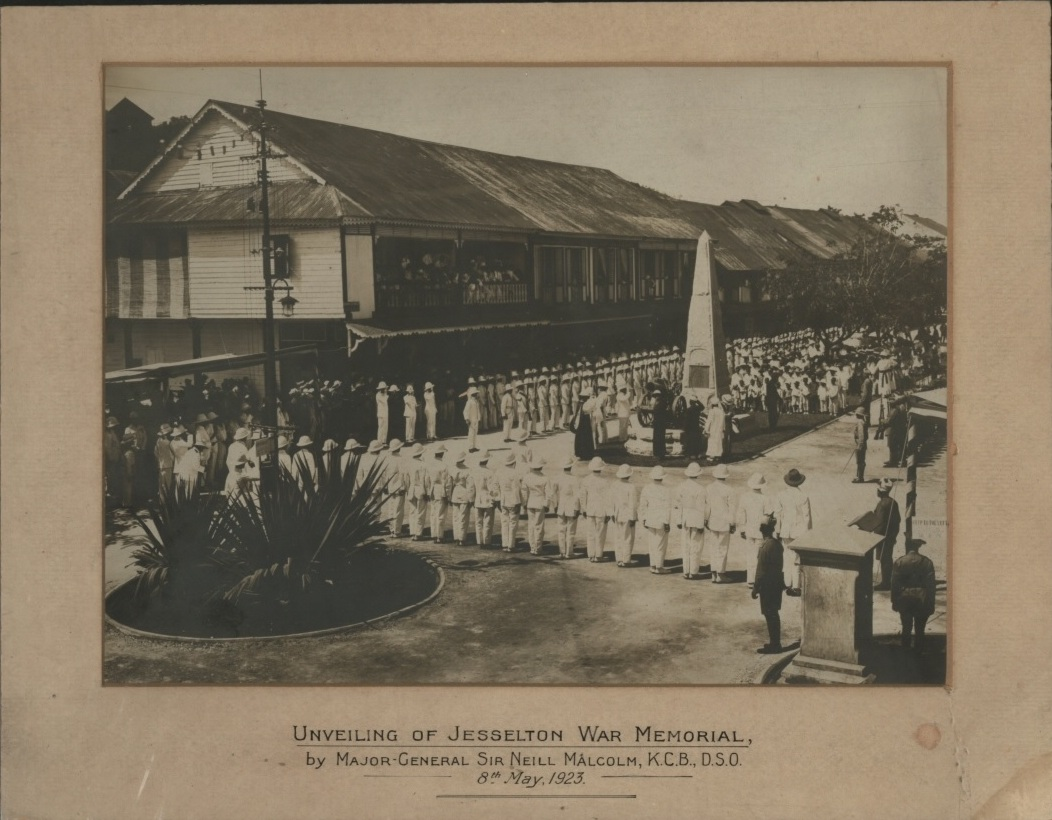
"Unveiling of Jesselton War Memorial, by Major-General Sir Neill Malcolm, K.C.B., D.S.O. 8th May. 1923."

Educated at St Peter's School, York, Eton College and the Royal Military College, Sandhurst, Malcolm was commissioned into the Argyll and Sutherland Highlanders as a second lieutenant on 20 February 1889.

He was promoted to lieutenant on 23 August 1893. In 1896 he travelled with Capt. Montagu Sinclair Wellby across Tibet and northern China. He served with the 2nd Battalion under Sir William Lockhart in the Tochi Field Force on the North West Frontier of India in 1897. Following a stint in Uganda, where he conducted operations in Shuli country, he was appointed a Companion of the Distinguished Service Order (DSO) and promoted to captain on 21 December 1898.

He served with the mounted infantry in the Second Boer War in South Africa from late 1899, and took part in the Battle of Paardeberg in February 1900, where he was severely wounded by a gunshot in his thigh.

After his return to the United Kingdom, he was, in January 1902, seconded from his regiment in order to attend the Staff College, Camberley and was later made a deputy assistant quartermaster general (DAQMG) at army headquarters in January 1906 and secretary of the historical section of the committee of Imperial Defence in 1908. In December 1909 he was made a brevet lieutenant colonel.

Promoted in August 1910 to major, he later succeeded Charles Ross as a general staff officer, grade 2 (GSO2) at the Staff College, Camberley in January 1912, and which carried with it the temporary rank of lieutenant colonel.

He served in the First World War, which began in the summer of 1914, and saw him promoted to temporary lieutenant colonel again. He initially succeeded Hugh Jeudwine as a general staff officer, grade 1 (GSO1) with the British Expeditionary Force (BEF). He was seconded for service on the staff and became the 11th (Northern) Division's GSO1 in January 1915 and was promoted to brevet lieutenant colonel in February. He later served with the Mediterranean Expeditionary Force (MEF), and then, promoted to brevet colonel, and later colonel, as chief of staff to Hubert Gough's Fifth Army in France. He was then general officer commanding (GOC) of the 66th (2nd East Lancashire) Division from December 1917, the 39th Division from 1918, and the 30th Division from later that year.

After the war Malcolm, who in January 1917 was promoted to major general, was chief of the British military mission to Berlin from 1919 and then GOC Troops in the Straits Settlements in 1921 before being made a KCB in January 1922 and finally retiring in 1924.

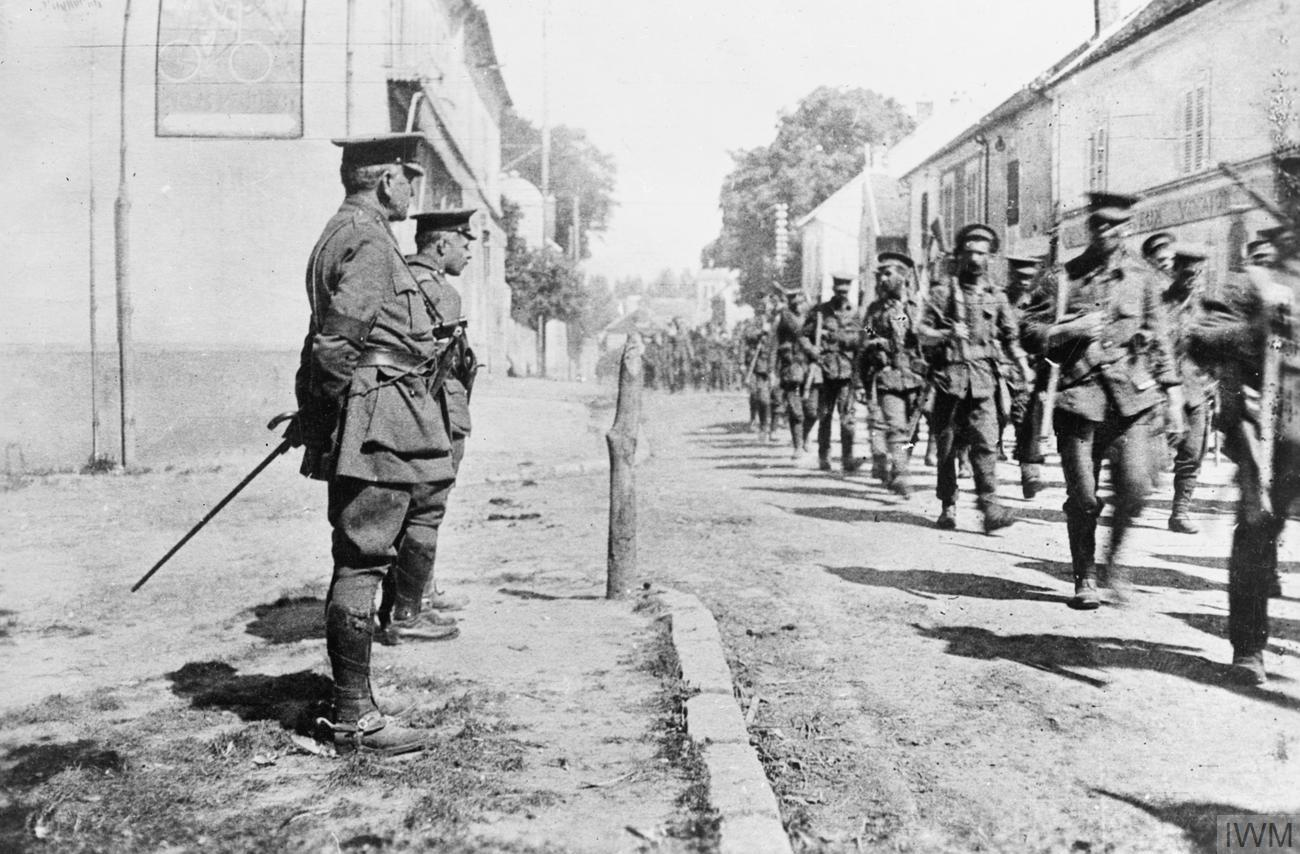
Major-General Charles Monro, with Colonel Neill Malcolm, inspecting troops of the 2nd Division on the march on the Western Front at some point in 1914.

It has been suggested that Malcolm, while in Berlin, provided the origin of the phrase 'stabbed in the back' to describe the reason for the German defeat. In the autumn of 1919, when Erich Ludendorff was dining with Malcolm, Malcolm asked Ludendorff why he thought Germany lost the war. Ludendorff replied with a list of excuses, including that the home front failed the army.

Malcolm asked him: "Do you mean, General, that you were stabbed in the back?" Ludendorff's eyes lit up and he leapt upon the phrase like a dog on a bone. "Stabbed in the back?" he repeated. "Yes, that's it, exactly, we were stabbed in the back." And thus was born a legend which has never entirely perished.

== Later life ==
After retiring from the British Army, Malcolm was President of the North Borneo Chartered Company from 1926 to 1946 and High Commissioner for German refugees from 1936 to 1938.

== Family ==
In May 1907 he married his cousin, Angela Malcolm; they had a daughter and two sons, one of whom was the British diplomat Dugald Malcolm.

== Bibliography ==
- Davies, Frank (1997). Bloody Red Tabs: General Officer Casualties of the Great War 1914–1918. London: Pen & Sword Books. ISBN 978-0-85052-463-5.

Military offices
Preceded by Herbert Lawrence	GOC 66th (2nd East Lancashire) Division; 1917−1918	Succeeded by Keppel Bethell
Preceded by Sir Dudley Ridout	GOC Troops in the Straits Settlements; 1921–1924	Succeeded by Sir Theodore Fraser
