= William Clamp =

Recipient of the Victoria Cross

William Charles Clamp
- Born: 28 October 1892; Motherwell, Lanarkshire
- Died: 9 October 1917 (aged 24); Poelcappelle, Passchendaele salient, Belgium
- Military career
- Allegiance: United Kingdom
- Branch: British Army
- Service years: 1914–1917 †
- Rank: Corporal
- Units: Cameronians; Green Howards
- Conflicts: World War I: Western Front; Battle of Passchendaele; Battle of Poelcappelle †
- Awards: Victoria Cross

William Charles Clamp VC (28 October 1892 – 9 October 1917) was a Scottish recipient of the Victoria Cross, the highest and most prestigious award for gallantry in the face of the enemy that can be awarded to British and Commonwealth forces.

Clamp was born on 28 October 1892 to Charles and Christina Dundas Clamp, of Flemington, Motherwell.

He was 24 years old, and a corporal in the 6th Battalion, The Yorkshire Regiment (Alexandra, Princess of Wales's Own), British Army when he was awarded the VC for actions on 9 October 1917 at the Battle of Poelcappelle, Belgium which led to his death.

== Citation ==
For most conspicuous bravery when an advance was being checked by intense machine-gun fire from concrete blockhouses and by snipers in ruined buildings. Corporal Clamp dashed forward with two men and attempted to rush the largest blockhouse. His first attempt failed owing to the two men with him being knocked out, but he at once collected some bombs, and calling upon two men to follow him, again dashed forward. He was first to reach the blockhouse and hurled in bombs, killing many of the occupants. He then entered and brought out a machine-gun and about twenty prisoners, whom he brought back under heavy fire from neighbouring snipers. This non-commissioned officer then again went forward encouraging and cheering the men, and succeeded in rushing several snipers' posts. He continued to display the greatest heroism until he was killed by a sniper. His magnificent courage and self-sacrifice was of the greatest value and relieved what was undoubtedly a very critical situation.

— The London Gazette, No. 30433, 18 December 1917

Clamp is commemorated on the Tyne Cot Memorial. His Victoria Cross is displayed at the Green Howards Museum, Richmond, North Yorkshire, England.
