= 198th (East Lancashire) Brigade =

2/1st East Lancashire Brigade 198th (2/1st East Lancashire) Brigade 198th Infantry Brigade
- Active: 1914-1919; 1939-1943
- Country: United Kingdom
- Branch: Territorial Army
- Type: Infantry
- Size: Brigade
- Part of: 66th (2nd East Lancashire) Division; 66th Infantry Division; 54th (East Anglian) Infantry Division
- Engagements: First World War

The 198th (2/1st East Lancashire) Brigade was an infantry brigade of the British Army that saw service during the First World War with the 66th (2nd East Lancashire) Division. It was reformed in the Second World War as the 198th Infantry Brigade and served with 54th (East Anglian) Infantry Division, where it remained in the United Kingdom throughout the war and was disbanded in late 1943.

== First World War ==
The brigade was raised as a duplicate of the East Lancashire Brigade. It was part of the 66th (2nd East Lancashire) Division, from those men in the Territorial Force who originally had not agreed to serve overseas. However, the brigade ended up serving in the trenches of the Western Front, suffering horrendous casualties in March 1918 during Operation Michael, the opening phase of the German Army's Spring Offensive. As with the rest of the division, the brigade suffered extremely heavy casualties and had to be completely reformed. The brigade saw service during the Hundred Days Offensive and the war ended on 11 November 1918. Both the brigade and division were disbanded in 1919, shortly after the end of the Great War.

=== Order of battle ===
- 2/4th Battalion, East Lancashire Regiment (renamed 4th Battalion 19 February 1918)
- 2/5th Battalion, East Lancashire Regiment (left July 1918)
- 2/9th Battalion, Manchester Regiment (left 22 July 1918)
- 2/10th Battalion, Manchester Regiment (disbanded 15 February 1918)
- 203rd Machine Gun Company, Machine Gun Corps (moved to 66th Battalion, Machine Gun Corps 11 March 1918)
- 198th Trench Mortar Battery
- 5th (Service) Battalion, Royal Inniskilling Fusiliers (from 19 July 1918)
- 6th (Service) Battalion, Royal Dublin Fusiliers (from 19 August 1918)
- 6th Battalion, Lancashire Fusiliers (from 22 September 1918)

== Second World War ==
In 1939, the brigade was reformed as the 198th Infantry Brigade, as part of the Territorial Army (TA). This was part of the expansion, which started in preparation for the Second World War. It was assigned to the 66th Infantry Division. However, the division was disbanded in June 1940, shortly after the British Expeditionary Force (BEF) was evacuated from Dunkirk. The brigade then became an independent formation for six months, before joining the 54th (East Anglian) Infantry Division until it was disbanded near the end of 1943.

=== Order of battle ===
- 8th (Irish) Battalion, King's Regiment (Liverpool) (until 4 July 1943)
- 6th Battalion, Border Regiment (until 9 September 1943)
- 7th Battalion, Border Regiment (until 9 December 1942)
- 198th Infantry Brigade Anti-Tank Company (formed 30 July 1940, disbanded 14 July 1941)
- 2nd Battalion, Hertfordshire Regiment (from 9 December 1942 until 23 August 1943)

Commanders

- Brigadier J.M. Radcliffe (until 12 August 1941)
- Brigadier A.C.T. Evanson (from 12 August 1941 until 10 May 1943)
- Brigadier R.K. Arbuthnott (from 10 May 1943 until 7 October 1943)
- Brigadier B.U.S. Cripps (from 7 October 1943)
