= Assevillers =

- Commune
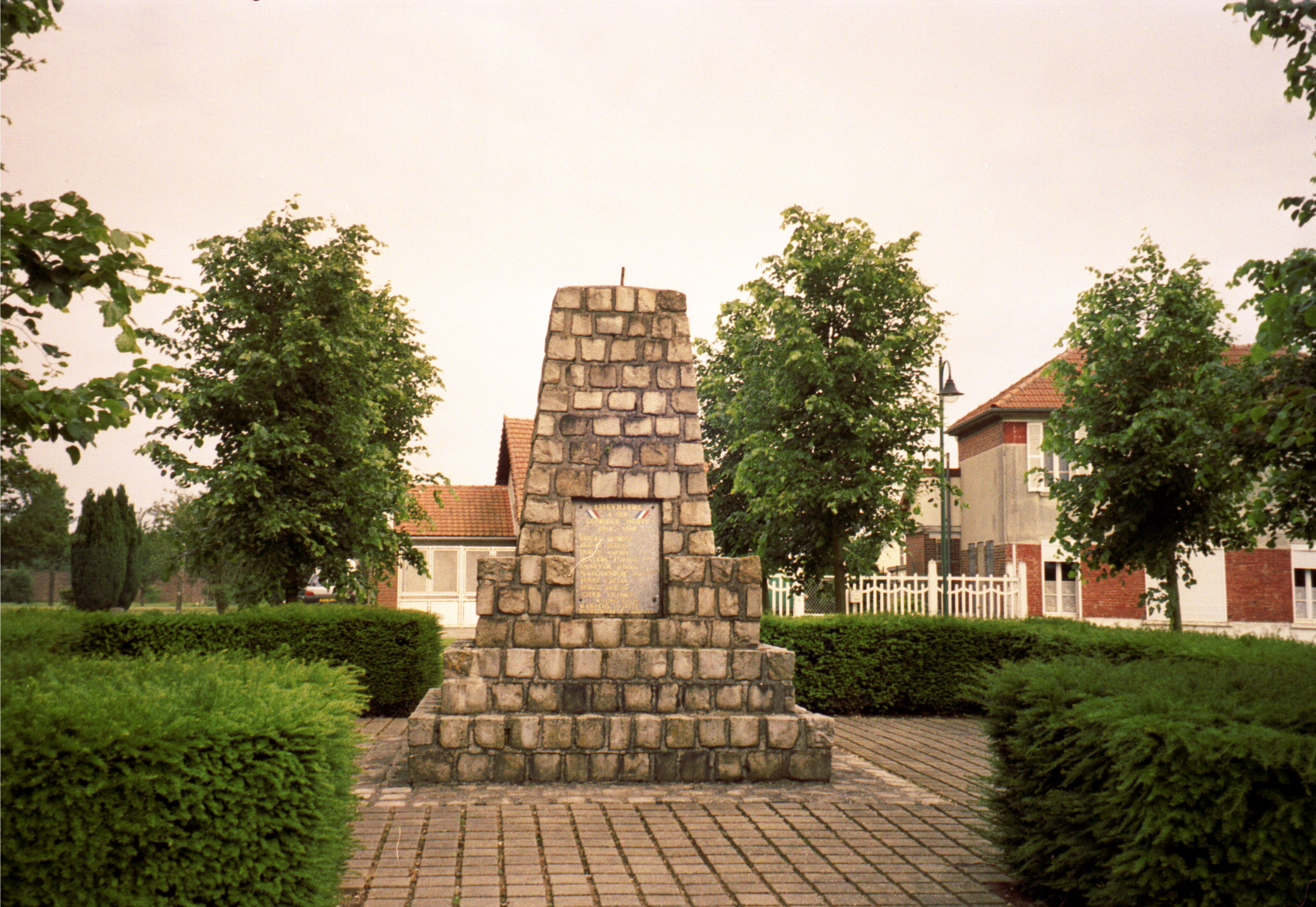
- The war memorial in Assevillers

- Coat of arms
- Location of Assevillers
- Location within France Location within Hauts-de-France
- Coordinates: 49°53′49″N 2°50′10″E
- Country: France
- Region: Hauts-de-France
- Department: Somme
- Arrondissement: Péronne
- Canton: Ham
- Intercommunality: CC Terre Picardie

Government
  - Mayor (2020–2026): Didier Jacob
- Area^{1}: 5.47 km^{2} (2.11 sq mi)
- Elevation: 87 m (285 ft)
- Highest elevation: 84 m (276 ft)
- Lowest elevation: 57 m (187 ft)
- Population (2023): 311
  - Density: 56.9/km^{2} (147/sq mi)
- Time zone: UTC+01:00 (CET)
  - Summer (DST): UTC+02:00 (CEST)
- INSEE/Postal code: 80033 /80200
- ^{1} French Land Register data, which excludes lakes, ponds, glaciers > 1 km^{2} (0.386 sq mi or 247 acres) and river estuaries.

Assevillers (French pronunciation: [asvile]; Picard: Asvilé) is a commune in the Somme department in Hauts-de-France in northern France.

== Geography ==
Assevillers is close to the motorway A1 Lille - Paris, the TGV Haute-Picardie station and the Albert – Picardie Airport. The nearest larger town is Péronne.

== History ==
During World War One, Assevillers was twice occupied by the German Army. There were many trenches to the west and to the east of Assevillers. During the battle of the Somme in 1916, Assevillers was destroyed. Assevillers was liberated by the 5th Division of the Australian Army on 28 August 1918.

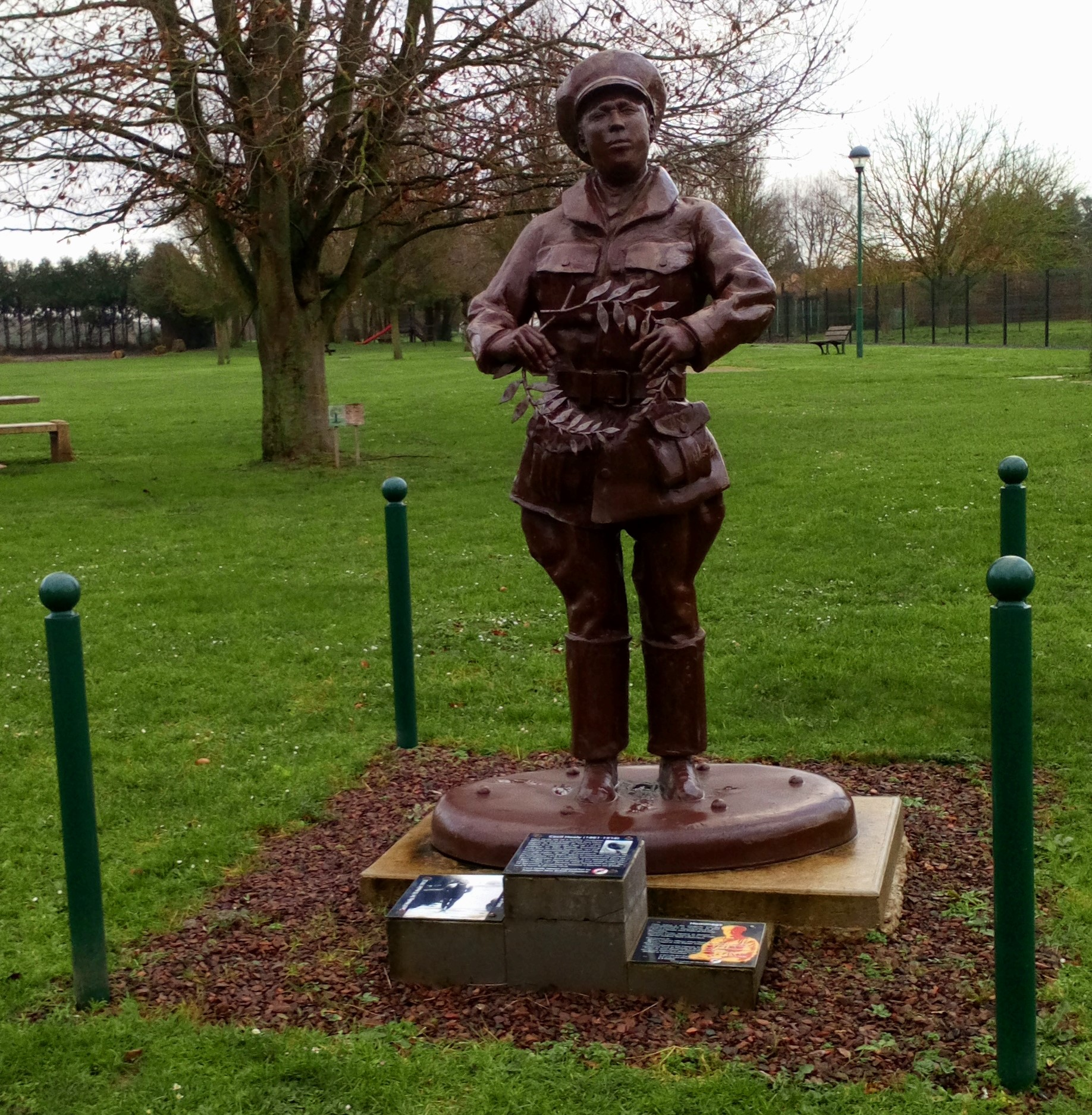
Monument to Cecil Healy

On 29 August 1918, Cecil Healy, Australian Olympic swimming Gold medalist, died nearby while clearing German machinegun posts during the Battle of Mont Saint-Quentin. A statue in honour of Healy, Australia's only Olympic Gold medalist to have been killed in combat, was erected in Assevillers in 2018. His grave is located in the Assevillers New British Cemetery.

== Assevillers rest area ==
Assevillers rest area is one of the largest motorway areas in Europe. There are many shops and hotels at this rest area which is situated alongside motorway A1, at 122 km between Paris and Lille. The Assevillers rest area is close to 'Memory Circuit' (the historical sites of the Somme marked by the first world war).

== Attractions ==
- The polisher "Gres Saint Martin"
- The church and City Hall
- Assevillers New British Cemetery
- Assevillers Rest Area

== See also ==
- Communes of the Somme department
- Assevillers Website
