= 74th Brigade (United Kingdom) =

Military unit

The 74th Brigade was a formation of the British Army. It was raised as part of the new army also known as Kitchener's Army and assigned to the 25th Division and served on the Western Front during the First World War. After suffering heavy losses in the German spring offensive in 1918 the brigade was reformed with new units. It fought on the Hindenburg Line in October and in Picardy in November.
The brigade was not reformed for the Second World War.

== Formation ==
From formation to the end of the Spring Offensive.

- 11th (Service) Battalion, Lancashire Fusiliers (Disbanded August 1918)
- 13th (Service) Battalion, Cheshire Regiment (Disbanded August 1918)
- 8th (Service) Battalion, East Lancashire Regiment (Left November 1918)
- 8th (Service) Battalion, Loyal North Lancashire Regiment (Left October 1915)
- 9th (Service) Battalion, Loyal North Lancashire Regiment (Left June 1918)
- 2nd Battalion, Royal Irish Rifles (Joined October 1915, left November 1917)
- 3rd Battalion, Worcestershire Regiment (Joined November 1917, left June 1918)
- 74th Machine Gun Company (Joined March 1916, transferred to 25th MG btn in March 1918)
- 74th Trench Mortar Battery (Formed June 1916)

On reforming after the Spring Offensive.

- 2/7th Battalion, Lancashire Fusiliers (Joined June 1918, disbanded July 1918)
- 21st (Service) Battalion, Middlesex Regiment (Islington) (Joined June 1918)
- 9th (Service) Battalion, Green Howards (Joined September 1918)
- 11th (Service) Battalion, Sherwood Foresters (Joined September 1918)
- 13th (Service) Battalion, Durham Light Infantry (Pioneers) (Joined September 1918)
- 74th Trench Mortar Battery
