= 25th =

25th is the ordinal form of the number 25. Twenty-fifth or 25th may also refer to:

- A fraction, 1/25, equal to one of 25 equal parts
- 25th of the month, a recurring calendar date
- 25th anniversary, also known as a Silver jubilee

== Geography ==
- 25th meridian east, a line of longitude
- 25th meridian west, a line of longitude
- 25th parallel north, a circle of latitude
- 25th parallel south, a circle of latitude
- 25th Avenue
- 25th Street (disambiguation)

== Military ==
- 25th Army (disambiguation)
- 25th Battalion (disambiguation)
- 25th Brigade (disambiguation)
- 25th Division (disambiguation)
- 25th Regiment (disambiguation)
- 25th Squadron (disambiguation)

== Other ==
- Twenty-fifth Amendment (disambiguation)
  - Twenty-fifth Amendment to the United States Constitution
- 25th century
- 25th century BC

== See also ==
- 25 (disambiguation)
- 25th Anniversary (disambiguation)
- The 25th Hour (disambiguation)
