= XXV Corps =

25 Corps, 25th Corps, Twenty Fifth Corps, or XXV Corps may refer to:

== Germany ==
- XXV Reserve Corps, German Empire, World War I
- XXV Army Corps (Wehrmacht), Nazi Germany, World War II

== Russian and Soviet Union ==
=== Russian Empire ===
- 25th Army Corps (Russian Empire)

=== Soviet Union ===
- 25th Army Corps (Soviet Union)
- 25th Mechanized Corps
- 25th Tank Corps

== United Kingdom ==
- XXV Corps (United Kingdom), a British deception formation during World War II

=== Rifle Volunteer Corps ===
- 25th (Ottery St Mary) Devonshire Rifle Volunteer Corps
- 25th Kent (Blackheath Artisans) Rifle Volunteer Corps
- 25th (Liverpool) Lancashire Rifle Volunteer Corps

== Other countries ==
- XXV Army Corps (Italy)
- XXV Corps (Ottoman Empire)
- XXV Corps (Union Army), American Civil War

== See also ==
- List of military corps by number
- 25th Army (disambiguation)
- 25th Battalion (disambiguation)
- 25th Brigade (disambiguation)
- 25th Division (disambiguation)
- 25th Regiment (disambiguation)
- 25th Squadron (disambiguation)
- 25th (disambiguation)
- XXV (disambiguation)
