= 25th Cavalry =

25th Cavalry may refer to:

== Divisions ==
- 25th Cavalry Division, Soviet Union

== Brigades ==
- 25th Air Cavalry Brigade, Poland

== Regiments ==
- 25th Cavalry (Frontier Force)
- 25th Cavalry Regiment (United States)

=== American Civil War regiments ===
==== Confederate Army ====
- 24th and 25th Consolidated Texas Cavalry Regiment
- 25th Virginia Cavalry Regiment

== Companies ==
- 25th (West Somerset) Company, Imperial Yeomanry

== See also ==
- 25th Division (disambiguation)
- 25th Brigade (disambiguation)
- 25th Regiment (disambiguation)
- 25th (disambiguation)
