= 25th Army =

25th Army may refer to:

- 25th Army (Wehrmacht), Germany
- Twenty-Fifth Army (Japan)
- 25th Combined Arms Army, Russia
- 25th Army (Soviet Union)

== See also ==
- Twenty-Fifth Air Force
- List of armies by number
- XXV Corps (disambiguation)
- 25th Division (disambiguation)
- 25th Brigade (disambiguation)
- 25th Regiment (disambiguation)
- 25th Battalion (disambiguation)
- 25th Squadron (disambiguation)
- 25th (disambiguation)
