= 25th Motorized Division =

25th Motorized Division may refer to:

- 25th Motorized Division (France)
- 25th Motorized Infantry Division (Germany), later the 25th Panzergrenadier Division, Wehrmacht
- 25th Infantry Division "Bologna", Italy, employed some motorized transport
- 25th Guards Motor Rifle Division, Soviet Union, 1957–1964, renumbered the 23rd Guards Motor Rifle Division in 1964
- 25th Guards Motor Rifle Division, Soviet Union, 1964–1992

== See also ==
- 25th Division (disambiguation)
