= 25th Street station =

25th Street station may refer to:

- 25th Street Station (Baltimore), a proposed development in Baltimore, Maryland, US
- 25th Street station (Charlotte), a light rail station in Charlotte, North Carolina, US
- South 25th Street station, a light rail station in Tacoma, Washington, US
- 25th Street (BMT Fifth Avenue Line), a station on the demolished BMT Fifth Avenue Line
- 25th Street (BMT Fourth Avenue Line), a local station on the BMT Fourth Avenue Line
- West 25th–Ohio City station, a Rapid Transit station in Cleveland, Ohio, US
