= NS25 =

NS25, NS 25, NS-25, NS.25, or variation, may refer to:

== Places ==
- City Hall MRT station (station code: NS25), Downtown Core, Singapore; a mass transit station
- Guysborough-Tracadie (constituency N.S. 25), Nova Scotia, Canada; a provincial electoral district

== Other uses ==
- New Penguin Shakespeare volume 25
- Blue Origin NS-25, a suborbital spaceflight by the New Shepard
- Büffel (NS-25), a Kriegsmarine patrol boat; see B-Dienst

== See also ==
- NS (disambiguation)
- 25 (disambiguation)
