= 25th Division =

25th Division may refer to:

== Infantry divisions ==
- 25th Motorized Division (France)
- 25th Division (German Empire)
- 25th Landwehr Division, German Empire
- 25th Reserve Division, German Empire
- 25th Panzergrenadier Division, Wehrmacht, Germany
- 25th Waffen Grenadier Division of the SS Hunyadi (1st Hungarian)
- 25th Infantry Division (India)
- 25th Karbala Division, Iran
- 25th Infantry Division "Bologna", Kingdom of Italy
- 25th Division (Imperial Japanese Army)
- 25th Infantry Division (Ottoman Empire)
- 25th Infantry Division (Poland)
- 25th Infantry Division (Russian Empire)
- 25th Guards Mechanized Division, Soviet Union
- 25th Guards Rifle Division, Soviet Union
- 25th Rifle Division (Soviet Union)
- 25th Infantry Division (South Korea)
- 25th Division (South Vietnam)
- 25th Division (Spain)
- 25th Division (United Kingdom)
- 25th Infantry Division (United States)
- 25th Division (Yugoslav Partisans)

== Cavalry divisions ==
- 25th Cavalry Division, Soviet Union

== Airborne divisions ==
- 25th Airborne Division, France
- 25th Parachute Division, France

== Armoured divisions ==
- 25th Panzer Division, Wehrmacht, Germany
- 25th Tank Division (Soviet Union)
- 25th Armored Division (United States)

== Special forces divisions ==
- 25th Special Mission Forces Division, Syria

== Aviation divisions ==
- 25th Air Division, United States

== Anti-air divisions ==
- 25th Air Defence Division, Russia

== See also ==
- List of military divisions by number
- 25th Army (disambiguation)
- XXV Corps (disambiguation)
- 25th Brigade (disambiguation)
- 25th Regiment (disambiguation)
- 25th Battalion (disambiguation)
- 25th Squadron (disambiguation)
