= Parkwood station =

Parkwood
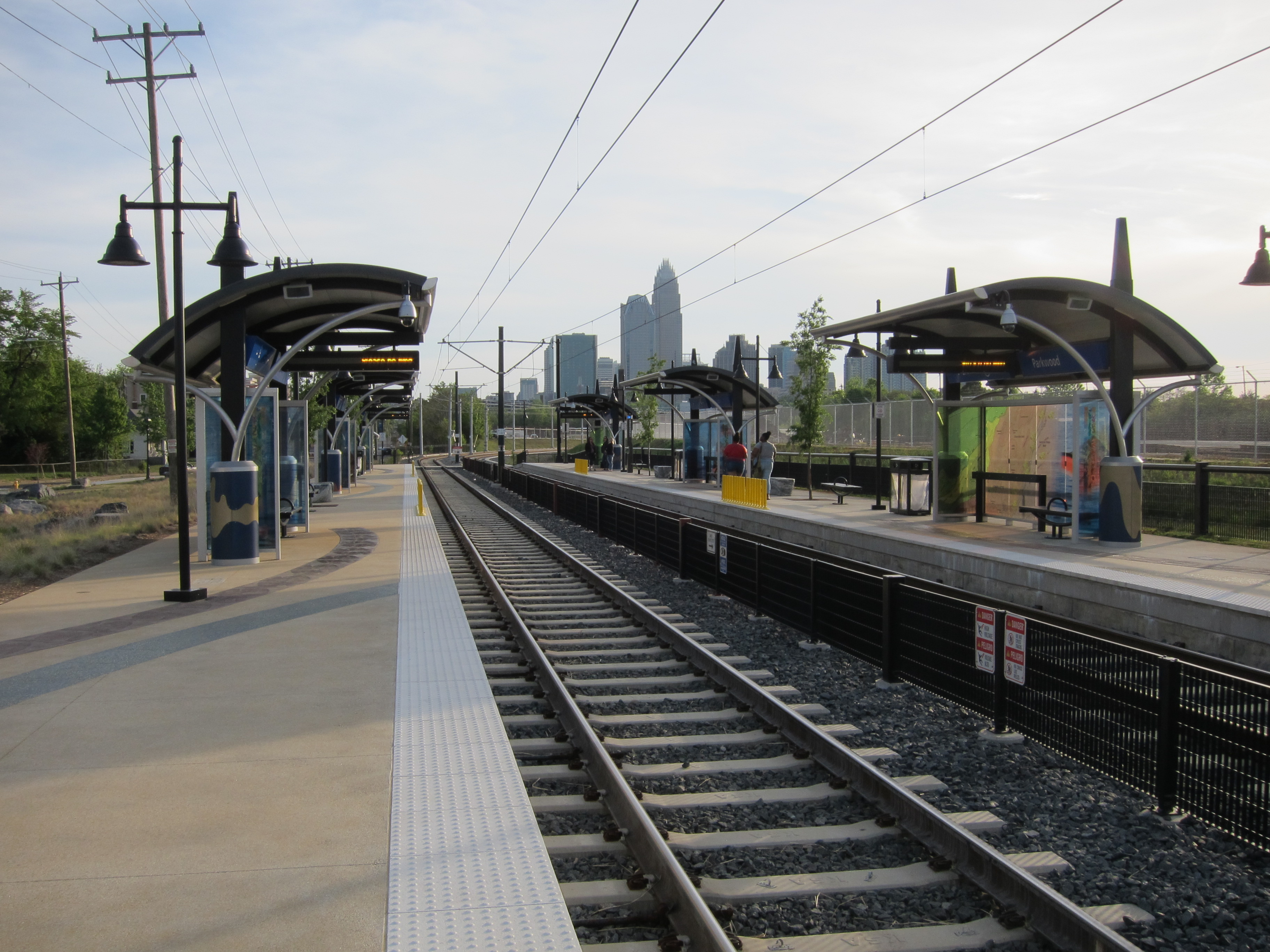
- Parkwood Station towards Uptown

General information
- Location: 327 Parkwood Avenue; Charlotte, North Carolina; United States
- Coordinates: 35°14′10.70″N 80°49′24.78″W
- Owner: Charlotte Area Transit System
- Platforms: 2 side platforms
- Tracks: 2

Construction
- Structure type: At-grade
- Cycle facilities: Bicycle racks
- Architect: STV Inc.
- Architectural style: Postmodern

Other information
- Website: Parkwood Station

History
- Opened: March 16, 2018

Services
Preceding station	CATS	Following station
9th Street toward I-485/South Boulevard	Lynx Blue Line	25th Street toward UNC Charlotte–Main
Location

Parkwood is a light rail station on the LYNX Blue Line in the Optimist Park neighborhood of Charlotte, North Carolina, United States. It opened on March 16, 2018, as part of the Blue Line extension to the UNC Charlotte campus. The station features a pair of side platforms and is the first station outside of Uptown Charlotte to the north.

== Public art ==
As part of the CATS Art in Transit program, Maria Artemis provided a Tectonic Suite of boulders, granite benches, and laminated windscreen glass. Parkwood Station is a history in geology, featuring the geological division of Charlotte in two different areas and time periods: the Charlotte Belt – the igneous rock beneath the center of the City – and the Carolina Slate Belt that is to the east. Thirty boulders sit intermittently along both edges of the pathway, echoing the boundary between the two geological areas in miniature form. The six passenger shelter windscreens provide the geological maps, timeline, and reference the geological and biological history.

Bicycle racks were designed by Darren Goins, using geometric abstract shapes.
