= The Broom Factory Factory =

American music venue, art space and event destination in Baltimore, Maryland, US

Coordinates: 39°19′10.5″N 76°37′33.5″W

The Broom Factory Factory (also known as "The BFF") is an American music venue, art space and event destination in the Remington neighborhood of Baltimore, Maryland.

The Broom Factory Factory opened in December 2012 as a mixed use facility. Currently the home of Charm City Studios and Music Collective, it has also functioned as a music venue, hosting a number of local artists, including T.T. The Artist and DDM.

On January 2, 2013, The Broom Factory Factory was featured on "QuErica Lately."

Before The Broom Factory Factory, the building's tenants were Big Bang Audio, who recorded artists such as George Clinton and the P-Funk All-Stars, and Woody Rock from Dru Hill.
