= 25th Brigade =

25th Brigade or 25th Infantry Brigade may refer to:

== Australia ==
- 25th Brigade (Australia)

== Canada ==
- 25th Canadian Infantry Brigade

== Greece ==
- 25th Armoured Brigade (Greece)

== Hungary ==
- 25th Infantry Brigade "György Klapka"

== India ==
- 25th Indian Infantry Brigade

== Indonesia ==
- 25th Raider Infantry Brigade

== Iran ==
- 25th Takavar Brigade

== Kuwait ==
- Kuwait 25th Commando Brigade

== Kyrgyzstan ==
- Scorpion 25th Special Forces Brigade

== North Korea ==
- 25th Infantry Brigade (North Korea)

== Poland ==
- 25th Air Cavalry Brigade

== Russia ==
- 25th Guards Motor Rifle Brigade
- 25th Rocket Brigade

== Soviet Union ==
- 25th Rocket Brigade

== Ukraine ==
- 25th Airborne Brigade
- 25th Public Security Protection Brigade
- 25th Transport Aviation Brigade

== United Kingdom ==
- 25th Armoured Engineer Brigade Royal Engineers
- 25th Army Tank Brigade
- 25th (East Africa) Infantry Brigade
- 25th Infantry Brigade (United Kingdom)
- 25th (Irish) Reserve Brigade
- 25th Brigade Royal Field Artillery

== United States ==
- 25th Combat Aviation Brigade

== See also ==
- Egyptian 25th Brigade ambush
- 25th Division (disambiguation)
- 25th Regiment (disambiguation)
- 25th Battalion (disambiguation)
- 25 Squadron (disambiguation)
