= Remington, Baltimore =

Coordinates: 39°19′5″N 76°37′21″W

Remington
- Neighborhood of Baltimore
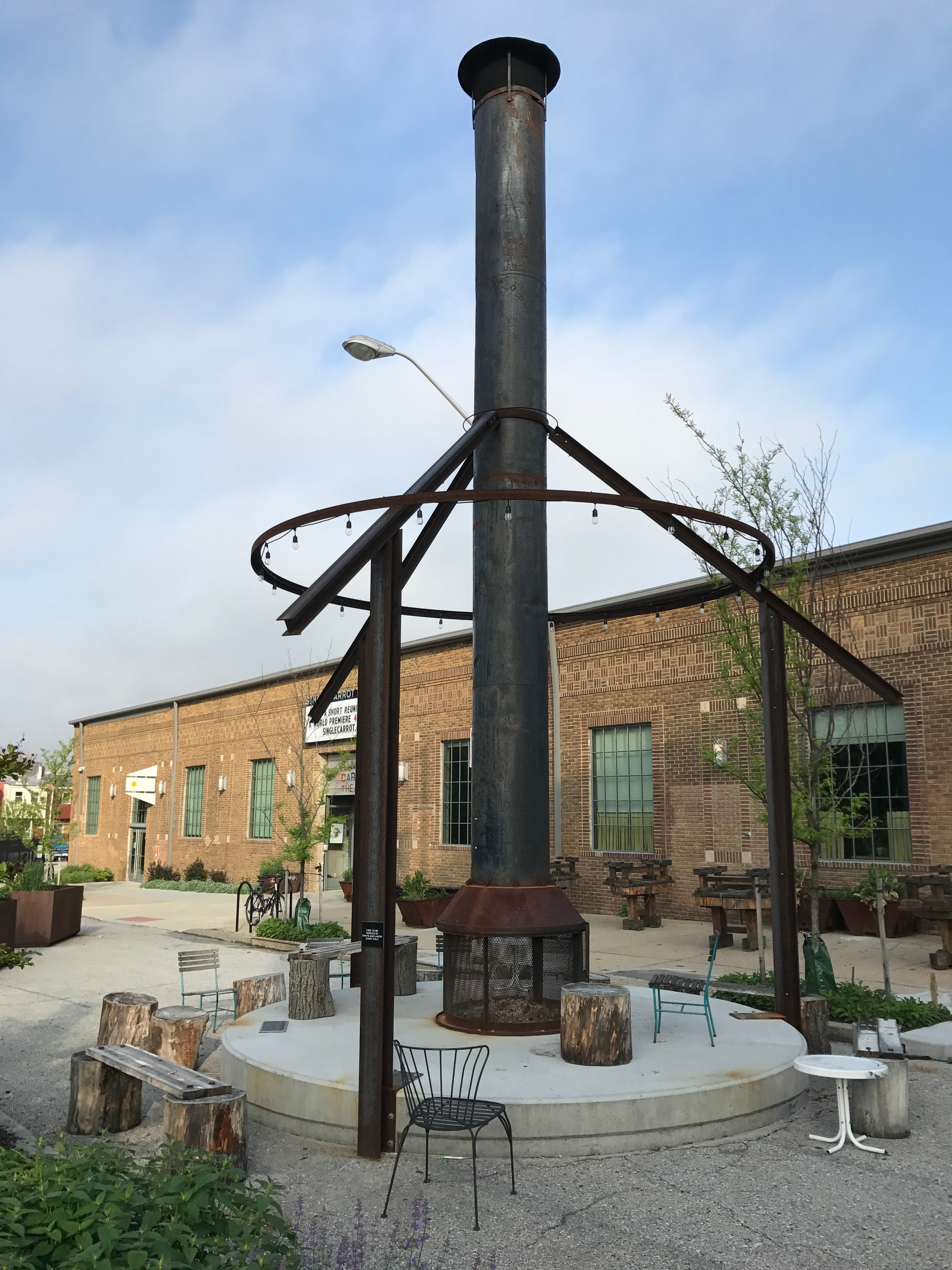
- Remington Community Plaza at North Howard & 26th Streets

- Location within Baltimore
- Country: United States
- State: Maryland
- City: Baltimore
- Time zone: UTC-5 (Eastern)
  - Summer (DST): EDT
- ZIP code: 21211
- Area code: 410, 443, and 667

Remington is a neighborhood in northern Baltimore bordered to the north by Hampden, Wyman Park, and Johns Hopkins University and to the east by Charles Village. The southernmost boundary is North Avenue and the long southwestern boundary is formed by Falls Road in the I-83 corridor. The neighborhood is split between two Baltimore City Council Districts (District 14 and District 12).

== History ==
Remington shared its early history with other nearby communities that grew up alongside the mills built along the Jones Falls, whose 260-foot (79 m) drop powered grist mills, iron foundries and textile mills. In addition to the water-powered factories along the Jones Falls, quarries in the Remington area operated for over 100 years and provided an enormous amount of stone for the building of Baltimore, furnishing material for thousands of foundations, walls and steps.

The neighborhood was named after William Remington, an early landowner who held property in the center of the area. As the population grew with the mills and quarries, America's first electric railway, built in 1885, brought new residents. Remington became an attractive suburb and was annexed into the city in 1888. Extensive building occurred from 1914 through the 1920s, with daylight and marble row houses being the dominant types. Marble row houses were characterized by their flat or slightly bowed fronts and featured decorative marble and stained glass. The more elaborate daylight row houses became popular in the 1920s and featured a window in each room, often including a skylight in interior rooms.

In 1984, 1,100 households of Appalachian heritage lived in the neighborhood of Remington. Many of these families traced their origins back to coal towns in Western Pennsylvania and hollows in southern West Virginia. These coal-mining families migrated to Baltimore in the 1950s and 1960s, searching for better jobs and better socioeconomic conditions than their parents and grandparents generations had access to. Many of the Appalachian people who settled in Remington worked in factories and mills upon moving to Baltimore. By the 1980s, many of the factories and mills had shut down, resulting in high levels of unemployment. Few wished to relocate back to Appalachia, where economic conditions were even worse. One-third of Remington lived in poverty during the early 1980s, many of them under the age of 18. The majority of Appalachian children in Remington at this time did not graduate high school. Due to low voter turn-out, poor Appalachian whites in Remington had little political clout.

A significant portion of the neighborhood was listed on the National Register of Historic Places in 2017 for its architecture and historic significance in the growth of the city.

== Subneighborhoods ==
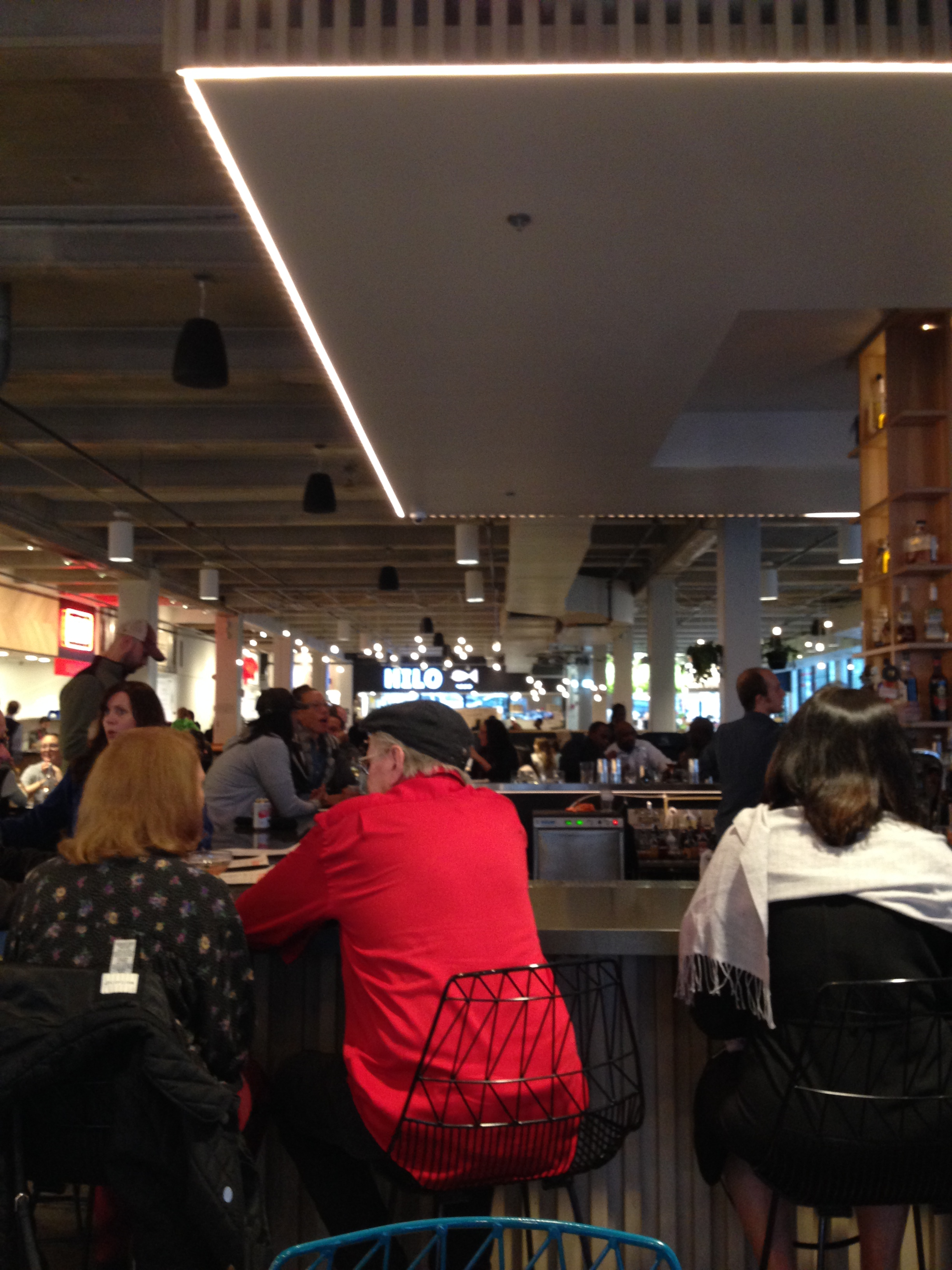
R House Food Hall

Due to its elongated shape, Remington is often divided into three distinct subneighborhoods.

Upper Remington refers to the area north of 29th Street, the main westbound arterial street through the area. Upper Remington is adjacent to the Johns Hopkins University and Wyman Park. Although primarily residential in character, it contains many of Remington's notable businesses and landmarks, including Charm City Cakes. Upper Remington's rowhouses tend to hold their value better than other parts of the neighborhood, and have a high rate of homeownership.

Middle Remington refers to the part of the neighborhood bounded by 29th Street on the north and the CSX rail corridor on the south. Middle Remington is more ethnically and racially diverse than the rest of the neighborhood. It is also more commercial in nature, with numerous historical corner businesses, light industrial uses, restaurants, and auto repair shops interspersed among the rowhouses that dominate the neighborhood's housing stock. Middle Remington contains notable institutions such as Papermoon Diner.

Lower Remington (also known as "Fawcett") refers the area south of the CSX rail corridor. The majority of the land area here is commercial and light industrial, but there are also a few blocks of rowhouses that feel secluded due to their isolation from other residential neighborhoods.

== Culture ==
- The Broom Factory Factory, a music venue, art space and event destination

== Demographics ==
According to the 2020 Census, there are 2,458 residents living in Remington. 60% are White, 12% are Black, 17% are Asian and 5% are Hispanic.

== Commerce ==
=== 25th Street Station ===
25th Street Station was a $70 million mixed-use development planned in the Remington and Charles Village neighborhoods of central Baltimore. Seawall Development announced that it would not proceed with the 25th Street Station project as originally planned, leaving it dead.

== See also ==
- National Register of Historic Places listings in North and Northwest Baltimore
