= XXV =

XXV may refer to:

- 25 (number)
- XXV (Klamydia album)
- XXV (Oomph! album)
- XXV (Robbie Williams album)
- XXV (The Shadows album)
- XXV (Vader album)
- XXV: The Essential, an album by Mike Oldfield
- XXV Corps (disambiguation), military units
