= Twenty-fifth of the month =

Recurring ordinal calendar date

The twenty-fifth of the month or twenty-fifth day of the month is the recurring calendar date position corresponding to the day numbered 25 of each month. In the Gregorian calendar (and other calendars that number days sequentially within a month), this day occurs in every month of the year, and therefore occurs twelve times per year.

- Twenty-fifth of January
- Twenty-fifth of February
- Twenty-fifth of March
- Twenty-fifth of April
- Twenty-fifth of May
- Twenty-fifth of June
- Twenty-fifth of July
- Twenty-fifth of August
- Twenty-fifth of September
- Twenty-fifth of October
- Twenty-fifth of November
- Twenty-fifth of December

In addition to these dates, this date occurs in months of many other calendars, such as the Bengali calendar and the Hebrew calendar.

== See also ==
- 25th (disambiguation)
