= 25th Street =

25th Street may refer to:

- 25th Street (Manhattan)
  - 25th Street (BMT Fifth Avenue Line), a defunct New York City Subway station
  - 25th Street (BMT Fourth Avenue Line), a local station on the BMT Fourth Avenue Line of the New York City Subway
- Historic 25th Street, a historic district located in Ogden, Utah, US

== See also ==
- 25th Street station (disambiguation)
