= Papermoon Diner =

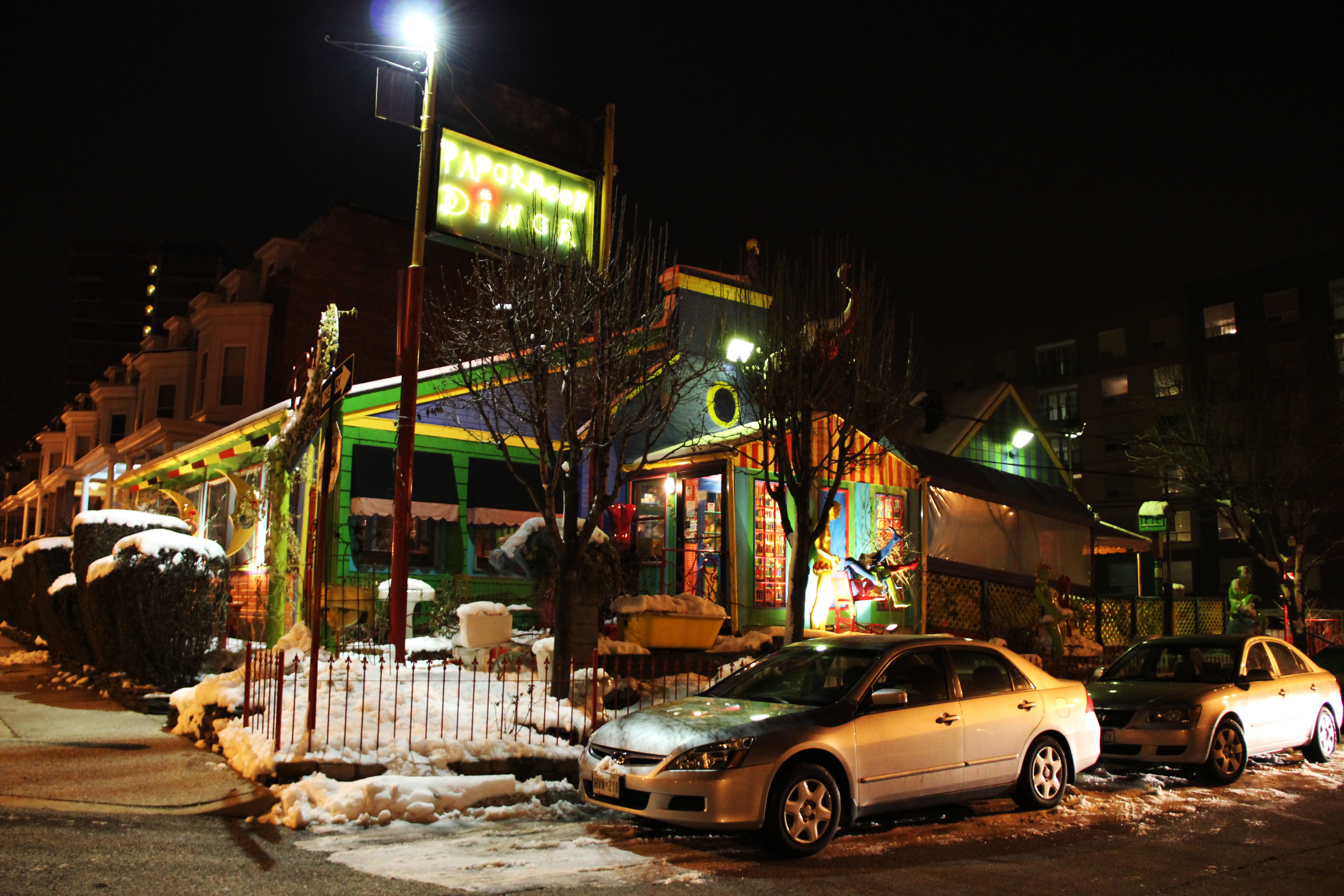
- Papermoon Diner in 2012
- Interactive map of Papermoon Diner

Restaurant information
- Established: 1994
- Owner: Un Kim
- Food type: American Fusion
- Location: 227 W. 29th St, Remington, Baltimore, Maryland, 21211, United States
- Coordinates: 39.3225°N 76.6212°W
- Website: www.papermoondiner24.com

Papermoon Diner is a diner in the Remington neighborhood of Baltimore, Maryland, which is known for its eclectic decor.

== History ==
The building, originally built in 1910, had previously been used as a diner under the names Tuttle House and Open House. Un Kim, who immigrated from South Korea in the 1970s, bought the building in 1994, and asked her friend from the Maryland Institute College of Art, David Briskie, to design the building's interior. Originally, Briskie used his and Kim's own collections of figurines and knickknacks to decorate, later sourcing from antique stores. They also collected grapevines and other natural items from local woods.

When Papermoon, named after the 1973 film Paper Moon, opened later in 1994, customers began to bring donations of items to be used as decor. In its early years, Papermoon had a reputation for edgy decor, with some people taking issue with the issue of naked mannequins. In response, Briskie began covering the mannequins with toys and other items.

Over time, Papermoon expanded the building to include additional seating areas.

== Decor ==
The diner's walls and shelves are layered with assorted items, including toy trains and cars, dolls and doll heads, and vintage items. The diner's designer, David Briskie, has continued to remain involved with the diner, regularly updating and renovating the decor. He has said he tries to keep the diner's decor kid-friendly. The diner has 3,000 Pez dispensers, which were donated by the company's CEO after he visited.

The building's exterior features colorfully painted mannequins and a blue and magenta bull statue.

The diner also features art pieces by local artists.

Pieces of the building's decorations have often been taken. Some of the diner's outdoor mannequins have been taken by sororities and fraternities during their rush events.

== Media ==
The diner was featured in a Baltimore-based episode of the Travel Channel's Man v. Food in 2018.
