= Twenty-fifth Amendment (disambiguation) =

The Twenty-fifth Amendment to the United States Constitution addresses issues related to presidential succession and disability.

The Twenty-fifth Amendment may also refer to:

- Twenty-fifth Amendment of the Constitution Bill 2002, a failed proposal to amend the Constitution of Ireland
- Twenty-fifth Amendment of the Constitution of India, 1971 amendment dealing with public compensation for private property
- Twenty-fifth Amendment to the Constitution of Pakistan, 2018 amendment merging the Federally Administered Tribal Areas (FATA) and Provincially Administered Tribal Areas (PATA) with the province of Khyber Pakhtunkhwa (KP)
