= 25th Anniversary =

25th Anniversary may refer to:

- Silver wedding anniversary
- Silver jubilee
- 25th Anniversary of The Phantom of the Opera

== Albums ==
- 25th Anniversary, by Diana Ross and The Supremes, 1986
- 25th Anniversary, by The Temptations, 1986
- 25th Anniversary (Wolfe Tones album), 1989
- 25th Anniversary, by Magnolia Jazz Band, 1998
- 25th Anniversary, by Bagatelle (band), 2004
- 25th Anniversary, by Pasadena Roof Orchestra, 2008
- 25th Anniversary, by The Nerves, 2001
- 25th Anniversary Album (Shirley Bassey album), 1978
- The 25th Anniversary Album (Lee Kernaghan album), 2017
- 25th Anniversary Collection, by K.C. & The Sunshine Band, 1999
- The ★ Collection: 25th Anniversary Edition, by The Monkees, 1992
- The Twenty-fifth Anniversary Anthology, by The Fixx, 2006
- Unarmed – Best of 25th Anniversary, by Helloween, 2009
- Interpretations: A 25th Anniversary Celebration, by The Carpenters, 1995
- 25th Anniversary Ultimate Best -The One-, by Luna Sea, 2014
