= 8th Lancashire Artillery Volunteers =

8th Lancashire Artillery Volunteers Lancashire Heavy Brigade, RGA
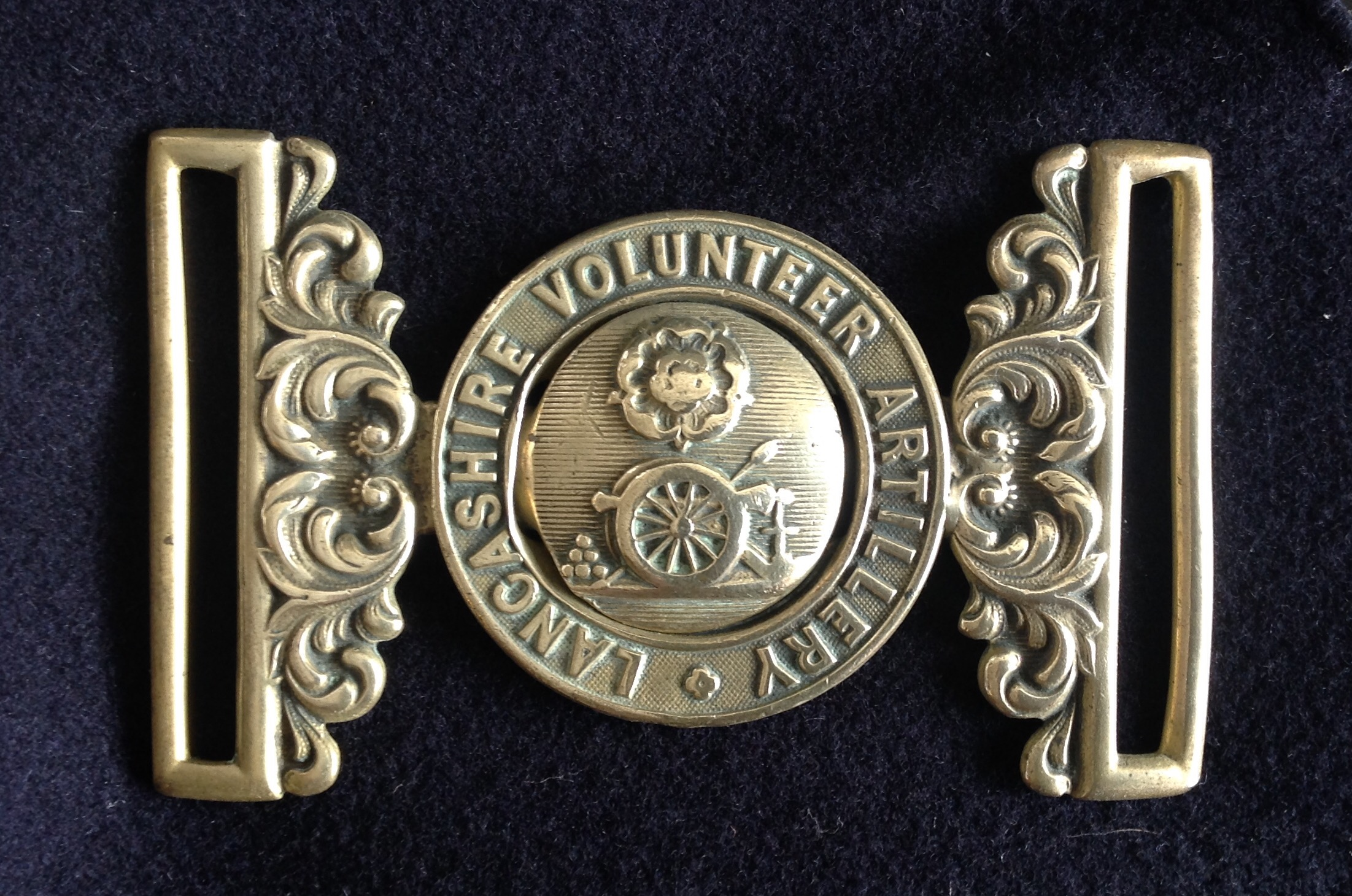
- 19th Century waistbelt of the Lancashire Volunteer Artillery
- Active: 1860–1919
- Country: United Kingdom
- Branch: Volunteer Force/Territorial Force
- Role: Garrison artillery Heavy artillery
- Size: 4 Batteries
- Garrison/HQ: Liverpool
- Engagements: Western Front

The 8th Lancashire Artillery Volunteers was a unit of the British Volunteer Force raised in Liverpool, Lancashire, in 1860. Later it transferred to the Territorial Force as a brigade of heavy artillery, and its batteries fought in many of the great battles on the Western Front during the First World War.

== Volunteer Force ==
The enthusiasm for the Volunteer movement following an invasion scare in 1859 saw the creation of many Rifle and Artillery Volunteer Corps composed of part-time soldiers eager to supplement the Regular British Army in time of need. One such unit was the 8th Lancashire Artillery Volunteer Corps (AVC) formed in Liverpool on 9 January 1860. In March the Army List showed it as having been absorbed by the 1st Lancashire AVC (also in Liverpool) but it retained its independence and by June had become part of the 1st Administrative Brigade of Lancashire Artillery Volunteers. On 19 October 1860 it became a fully independent unit. It also raised additional batteries: the 2nd on 28 June 1860, 3rd on 14 September 1860, 4th and 5th on 12 October 1860, 6th on 23 April 1861, 7th and 8th by July 1861. In April 1864 it absorbed the 25th (Liverpool) Lancashire Rifle Volunteer Corps also formed on 9 January 1860 and recruited mainly from the Mersey Steel & Iron Company. The 8th Lancashire AVC's headquarters (HQ) was at the Mersey Steel & Iron Co in 1869, but from 1870 it was in Toxteth Park, Liverpool. By the 1880s it was at Sefton Barracks, Upper Warwick Street, Toxteth.

When the Volunteers were consolidated into larger units in 1880 the 8th Lancashire AVC was large enough to retain its identity: it had 10 batteries by 1864 and 12 by May 1885, when it was reduced to eight. In 1882 all the AVCs were affiliated to one of the territorial garrison artillery divisions of the Royal Artillery (RA) and the 8th Lancashires became part of the Lancashire Division. In 1889 the structure was altered, and the corps joined the Southern Division. In 1899 the RA was divided into separate field and garrison branches, and the artillery volunteers were all assigned to the Royal Garrison Artillery (RGA). In 1902 their titles were changed, the Liverpool unit becoming the 8th Lancashire Royal Garrison Artillery (Volunteers), designated as heavy artillery (ie semi-mobile heavy field artillery, rather than fixed garrison artillery).

== Territorial Force ==
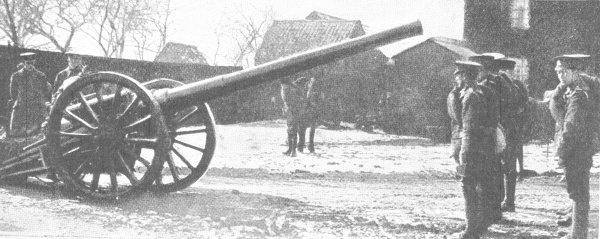
4.7-inch gun on 'Woolwich' carriage, ca 1914

When the Volunteers were subsumed into the new Territorial Force (TF) under the Haldane Reforms of 1908, the 8th Lancashire RGA (V) formed the Lancashire Heavy Brigade, RGA of two batteries (initially designated West and East, then from 1910 the 1st and 2nd) and ammunition columns, all at Sefton Barracks.

The Lancashire Brigade was not intended to be a tactical unit: the 1st Lancashire Heavy Bty was attached to the TF's West Lancashire Division, while the 2nd was attached to the East Lancashire Division. Each was equipped with four 4.7-inch guns and had its own dedicated ammunition column.

== First World War ==
=== Mobilisation ===
The West Lancashire Division had just begun its annual training when war broke out on 4 August 1914 and the units immediately returned to their peacetime HQs to mobilise. The men of the East Lancashire Division similarly gathered, and were billeted close to their HQs. The TF was intended for home service, but on 10 August its units were invited to volunteer for overseas service. The East Lancashire Division, having volunteered en masse, moved into camps for battle training on 20 August. On 15 August 1914, the War Office (WO) issued instructions to separate those men who had signed up for Home Service only, and form these into reserve units. Then on 31 August, the formation of a reserve or 2nd Line unit was authorised for each 1st Line unit where 60 per cent or more of the men had volunteered for Overseas Service. The titles of these 2nd Line units would be the same as the original, but distinguished by a '2/' prefix. In this way duplicate batteries, brigades and divisions were created, mirroring those TF formations being sent overseas.

On 5 September the East Lancashire Division was ordered to Egypt to relieve the Regular Army garrison there for service on the Western Front. It was the first TF division to go overseas, and embarked on 10 September, leaving behind the 1/2nd Lancashire Heavy Bty, which joined the 2nd East Lancashire Division that was being assembled. Similarly, the West Lancashire Division sent most of its infantry units to the Western Front between November 1914 and April 1915, when the 1/1st Lancashire Hvy Bty joined the 2nd West Lancashire Division.

=== 1/1st Lancashire Heavy Battery ===
The 1/1st Bty joined the 2nd West Lancashire Division (57th (2nd West Lancashire) Division from August 1915) after the last of the 1st Line division was broken up in April 1915. The new division was being assembled and trained round Canterbury, and the battery remained with it until the end of the year. On 28 December the battery moved to Woolwich to prepare for overseas service. It disembarked at Le Havre on 26 January 1916, and joined 29th Heavy Artillery Group (HAG) on 1 February.

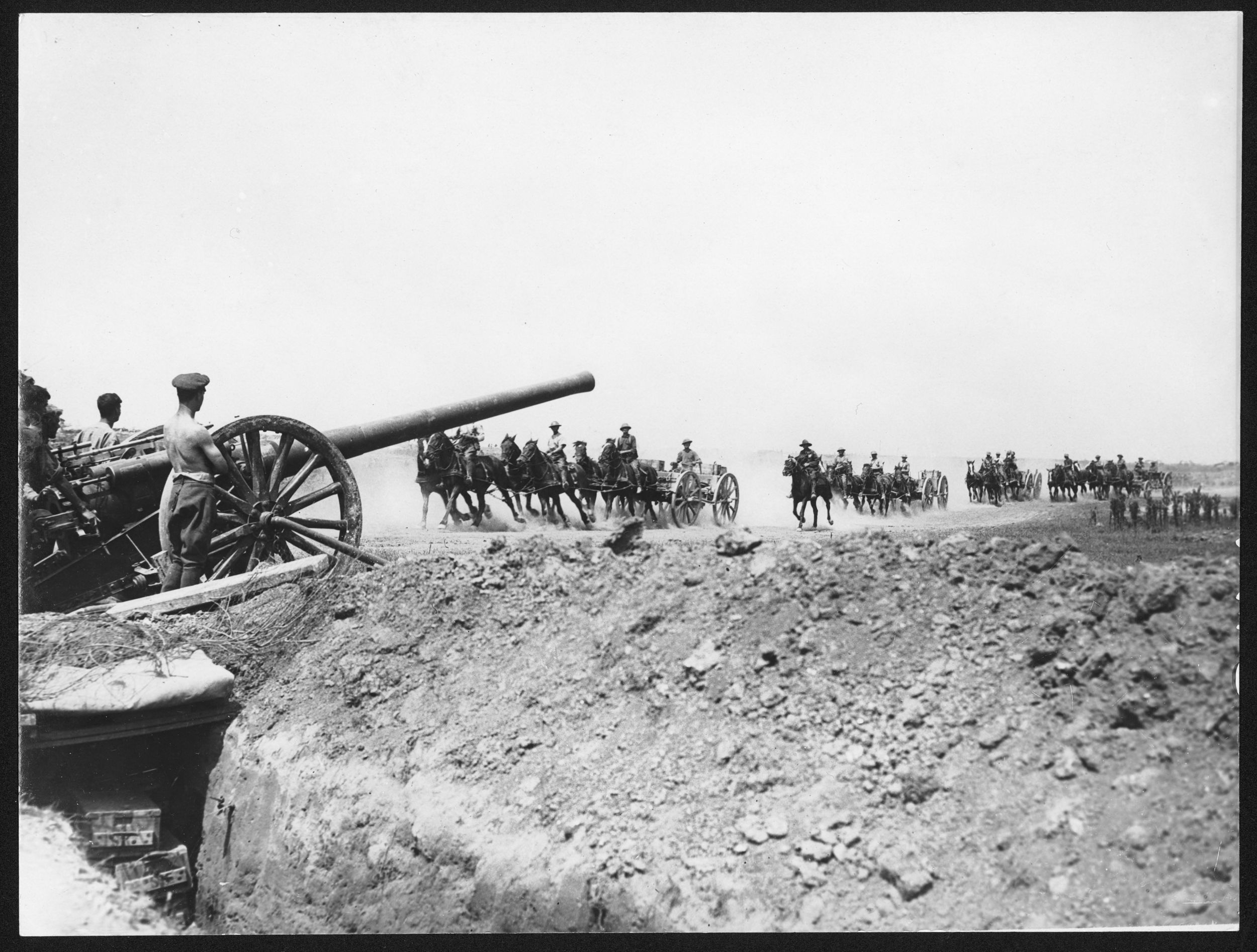
4.7-inch gun on the Somme, 1916

==== Somme ====
29th HAG was part of Fourth Army, which was being assembled for the forthcoming 'Big Push' (the Battle of the Somme). The group's role was to support XIII Corps in its assault on the German lines from Maricourt to beyond Carnoy. The guns were assembled on the reverse slopes of Maricourt Ridge, from which the observation posts (OPs) had excellent views over the long gentle slope to Montauban Ridge, up which the British infantry had to attack. In this sector the British had almost a four-to-one advantage in heavy artillery (one heavy gun or howitzer for every 47 yards (43 m) of front) and by 'Z Day' had achieved complete mastery with its counter-battery (CB) fire, which had begun six days earlier and continued during the attack.

When the infantry launched their assault on 1 July, XIII Corps had considerable success (certainly compared to most of the rest of the attack) and most of its casualties were caused by machine gun and rifle fire from strongpoints, instead of by artillery, as was usually the case. 30th Division on the right reached both its first and second objectives (Montauban), but could not go further, because the neighbouring 18th Division was held up. 18th Division, however did achieve all its objectives by 16.00. The sector was reported to be eerily quiet by the late afternoon, with only a single German 5.9-inch gun shelling Montauban Alley at extreme range, slowly and inaccurately. Unfortunately, much less success had been achieved on the rest of the front and the Somme Offensive ground on until November 1916.

The obsolescent 4.7-inch guns were progressively replaced in the BEF by 60-pounders during 1916. In December 1916 the WO decided that all heavy batteries should be composed of six guns and 1/1st Lancashire Hvy Bty was brought up to that strength on 12 February 1917 when it was joined by a section of 193rd Heavy Bty, a New Army unit newly arrived in France and immediately broken up. (Note: 193rd Heavy Bty had been formed at Ewshot on 21 June 1916; its other section was posted to 1/1st London Heavy Bty.)

==== Vimy ====
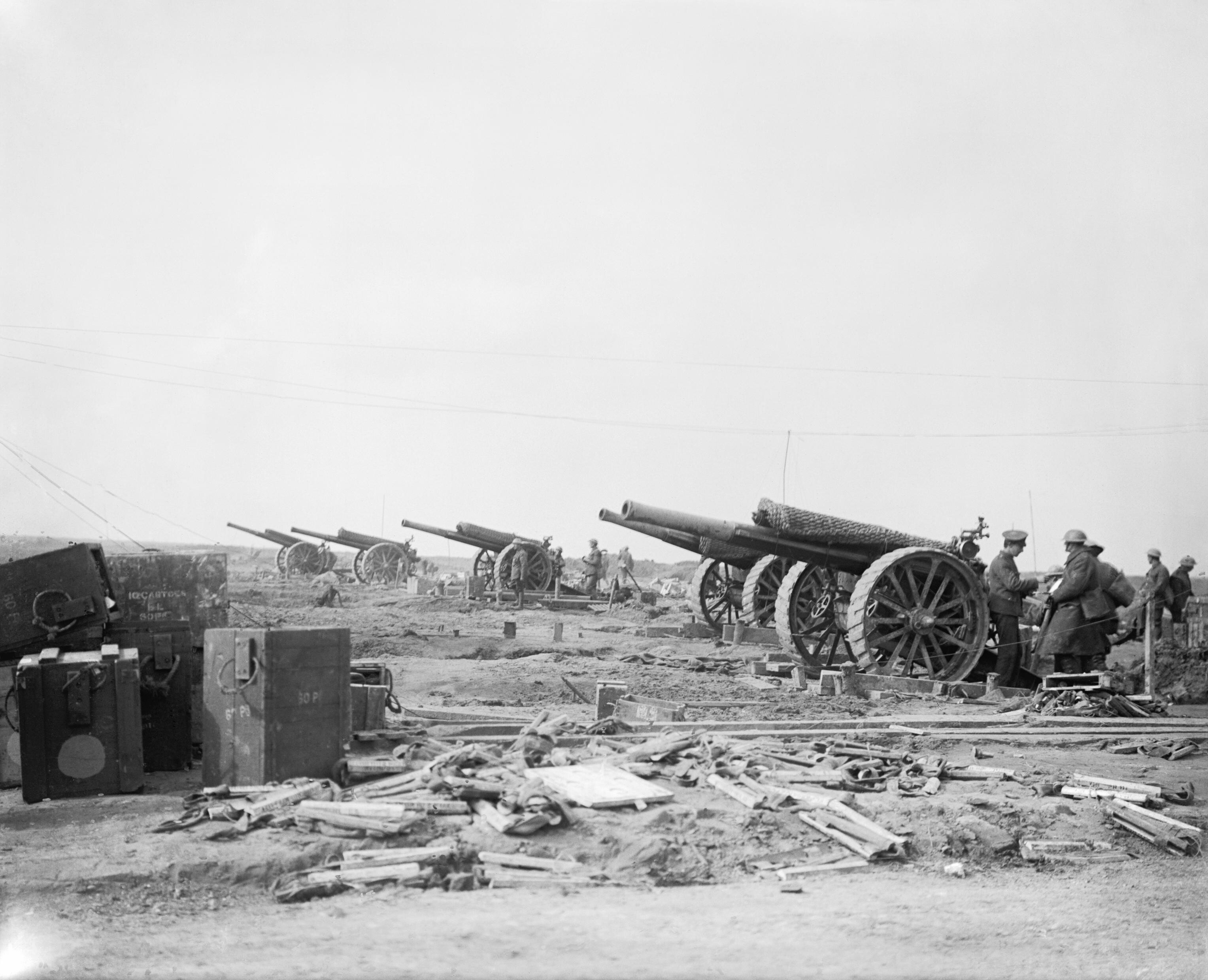
A battery of 60-pounders deployed during the Battles of Vimy and Arras, 1917

1/1st Lancashire Hvy Bty had been transferred to 57th HAG on 7 December 1916. It rejoined 29th HAG when it was brought up to six guns, and then on 14 March transferred to 84th HAG with First Army further north, which it joined a week later. First Army was preparing for participation in the Arras Offensive, and 84th HAG was assigned to I Corps for the attack on Vimy Ridge on 9 April. The concentration of heavy guns was one for every 40 yards (37 m)of front. The artillery preparation began on 20 March, with the batteries of 84th HAG firing from around Bois de Bouvigny on the north flank of the attack, from where they could virtually enfilade the German lines in support of I Corps. The artillery plan for the heavy guns emphasised CB fire. At Zero hour, while the field guns laid down a Creeping barrage to protect the advancing infantry, the 60-pounders switched to 'searching' fire on the German rear areas to catch machine gunners and moving infantry. When the British infantry reached their Phase 2 objective (the Blue Line) the field guns would move forward and the 60-pounders move up to occupy their vacated positions. The attack went in on 9 April with I Corps and Canadian Corps successfully capturing Vimy Ridge while Third Army attacked further south near Arras. The only hold-up on 9 April was at Hill 145, near the north end of the Canadian attack, and the capture of this position was completed the next day. Fighting in the southern sector (the Battle of Arras) continued into May.

==== Later war ====
On 15 May, 1/1st Lancashire Hvy Bty transferred to 15th HAG, quickly moving on to 98th HAG on 28 May, with which it stayed while First Army carried out a number of operations round Oppy Wood and Hill 70. On 4 September it moved to 87th HAG, then on 25 October to 46th HAG with Second Army, which was engaged in the final actions of the Battle of Passchendaele.

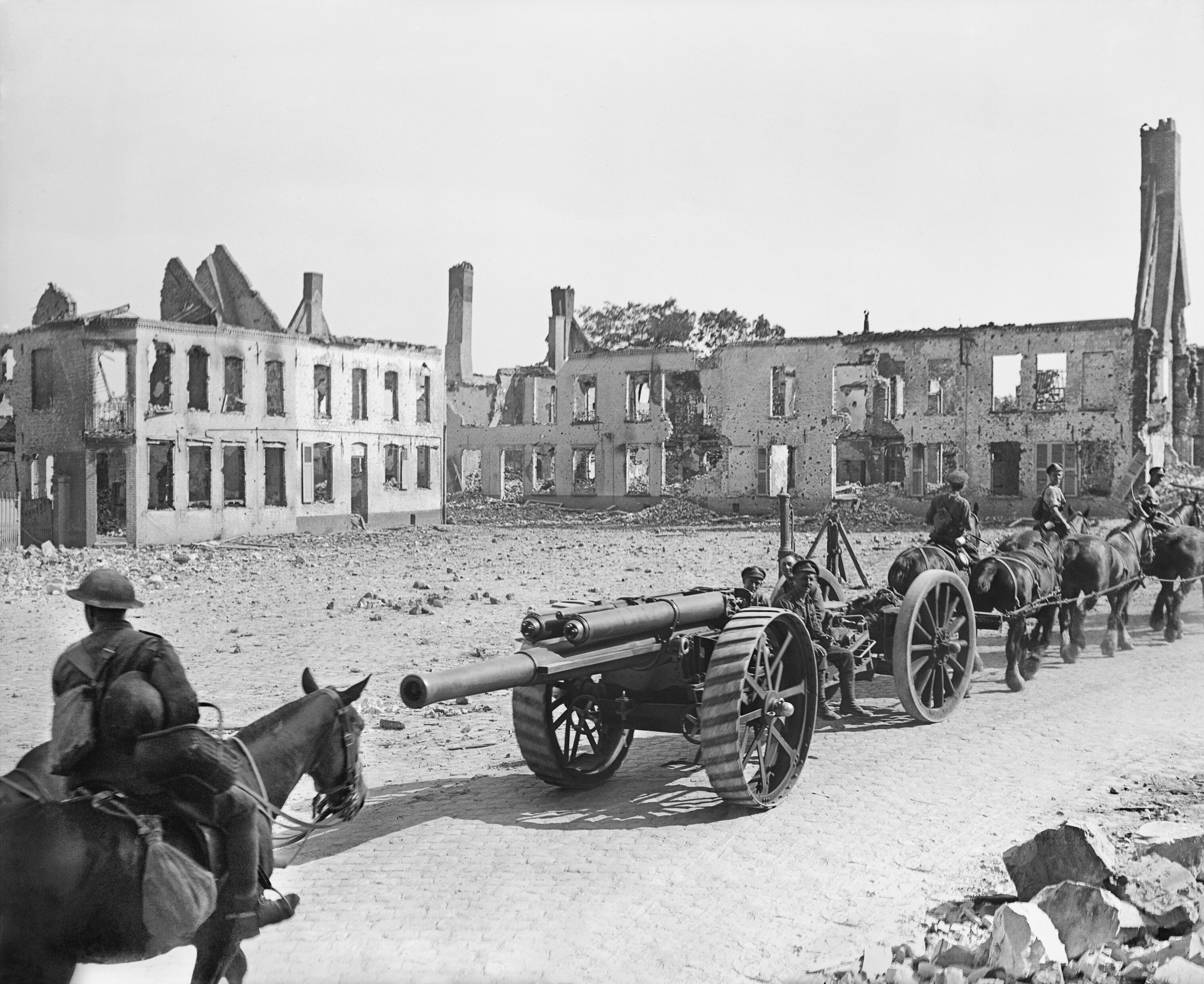
A 60-pounder moving up during the Hundred Days Offensive, 1918

Second Army HQ was sent to the Italian Front at the end of 1917, and Fourth Army took over the Ypres Salient. By now HAG allocations were becoming more fixed, and on 1 February 1918 the HAGs were converted into permanent RGA brigades, with 46th becoming a 'Mobile' brigade of 60-pounders and 6-inch howitzers. Apart from a temporary attachment to 79th HAG from 24 December to 28 January 1918, 1/1st Lancashire Hvy Bty remained with 46th Bde until the end of the war.

Fourth Army was engaged in the second phase of the German spring offensive in April 1918 (the Battle of the Lys). 46th (Mobile) Bde moved to First Army on 1 May. The Allied Hundred Days Offensive began on 8 August, with First Army attacking at Arras and the Drocourt-Quéant Line in late August and early September. On 2 October, 46th (Mobile) Bde transferred to Fifth Army, which launched its final advance that day, liberating Lille on 17 October ad closing up to the Scheldt. By the Armistice with Germany, Fifth Army was across the Dendre.

=== 1/2nd Lancashire Heavy Battery ===
After the East Lancashire Division departed for Egypt, 1/2nd Hvy Bty was attached to the 2nd Line division (later 66th (2nd East Lancashire) Division), but did not fully join it in Kent until September 1915 after the Right Section of the battery returned from detachment at Sunderland. It left the division on 5 January 1916 and went to Woolwich to mobilise. It disembarked with its 4.7-inch guns at Le Havre on 9 February 1916 and joined 16th HAG. It moved rapidly between HAGs: to 29th on 3 March and 21st on 12 March before joining 18th on 14 May. This HAG was with Second Army HQ in the Ypres Salient, but on 10 September it reinforced Fourth Army HQ for the later battles of the Somme Offensive.

The battery joined 62nd HAG on 2 December. On 12 February 1917 it was made up to six guns when it was joined by a section from 118th Hvy Bty, a Regular battery that had been in France since 1914. The enlarged battery then joined 14th and then 23rd HAG, shortly before they moved to Fifth Army. However, 1/2nd Lancashire Hvy Bty returned to 29th HAG on 28 March and moved with it to First Army on 14 April, though it supported XVII Corps of Third Amy in the success at Arras on 9 April 1917. Apart from a brief period with 99th HAG, the battery remained with 29th HAG, transferring with it to Second Army in July, and then changing to 65th HAG. Second Army played a subsidiary role in the Third Ypres Offensive during August. On 5 September the battery moved to 39th HAG with Third Army, then 17th HAG on 23 October.

==== Cambrai ====
The battery came under the command of 50th HAG on 16 November, in time for Third Army's great tank attack on 20 November (the Battle of Cambrai). 50th HAG was assigned to III Corps, which used its 'heavies' to support individual attacking divisions as well as for CB fire. Efficient flash spotting and sound ranging ensured 90 per cent accuracy of the CB fire, and the combination of tanks and artillery on III Corps' front overwhelmed the Hindenburg Line defences. However, getting the batteries forward to support follow-up attacks on succeeding days proved difficult, and the attacks fell short of a complete breakthrough. When the German counter-attacks broke through on 30 November, the battery prepared for withdrawal before 10.00, calling up the horse teams from the wagon lines. The situation seemed to improve so the guns opened fire again and continued in action on the Quentin ridge until the last moment. Heavy shelling had rendered two 'hopelessly out of action' and damaged the others. They withdrew to Metz as the Germans overran the position. One gun situated in a sunken road south of Marcoing was damaged by shellfire and had to be abandoned as the rest got away.

During the winter, 1/2nd Lancashire Hvy Bty switched to 86th HAG on 14 December, 57th HAG on 17 December, and finally returned to 21st HAG with Fifth Army on 27 December, with which it stayed for the rest of the war. On 1 February 1918, 21st HAG became 21st (Mobile) Brigade, RGA.

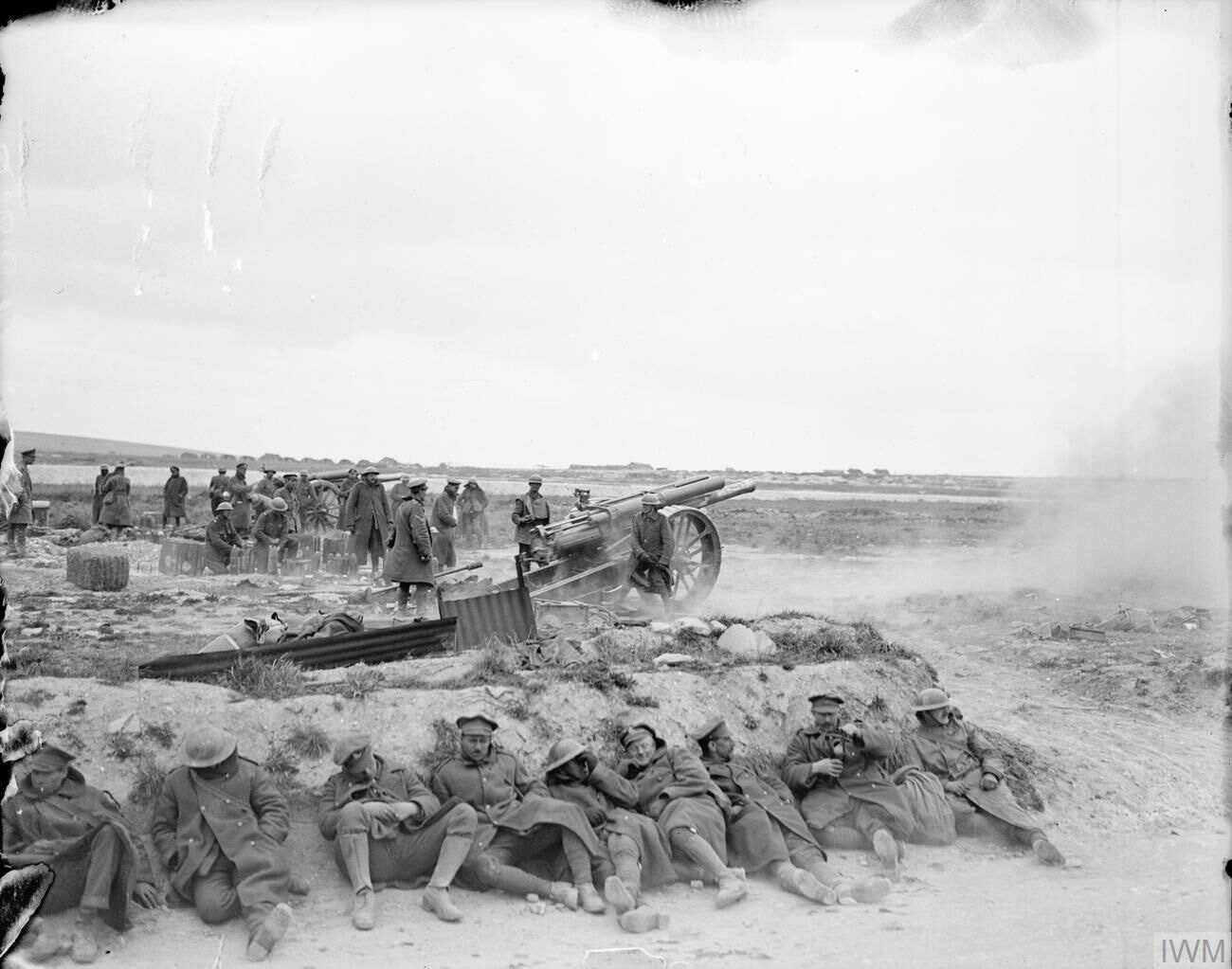
A 60-pounder battery firing in the open during the German Spring Offensive, 1918

==== Spring Offensive ====
The Germans launched their Spring Offensive on 21 March 1918, primarily against Fifth Army. By 28 March, XIX Corps (all that remained effective from Fifth Army) was struggling to maintain a link between Third Army and VI French Corps. There was bitter fighting between the Rivers Avre and Somme, during which the French retired, exposing the British right flank and forcing a British retirement late in the day. The battery had its 60-pounders in action near Warfusée as the British infantry fell back at 19.30, closely pursued by the Germans, who engaged the gun positions with machine guns from a flank. Part of the battery was withdrawn but one section could not get its horse teams up under the heavy fire. The section commander, Lt N. Roberts, with some gunners manhandled some ammunition wagons to provide flank protection against the fire, and then got his teams up and 'snatched his two heavies from under the very noses of the enemy, a most gallant and courageous act'.

Fifth Army was reconstituted as Fourth Army at the beginning of April, and 21st (Mobile) Bde remained with it until the Armistice, through the later phases of the Spring Offensive and then the Allied Hundred Days Offensive (see above).

=== 2/1st Lancashire Heavy Battery ===
The 2/1st Bty trained at Blackpool until 26 November 1915, when it joined 57th Division at Canterbury (just before the 1st Line battery left for France). It received four 4.7-inch guns from Southampton on 29 December. 57th Division formed part of Second Army (Home Forces) of Central Force, and was quartered around Canterbury on home defence duties until July 1916 when it transferred to the Emergency Reserves in Aldershot Command. However, 2/1st Hvy Bty left the division and went to France independently. It disembarked at Le Havre on 1 July and on 4 July joined 'Loring's Group' with II ANZAC Corps.

==== Fromelles ====
The battery was thrown straight into supporting a disastrous diversionary attack at Fromelles made by II ANZAC Corps with raw troops (the Official History emphasises the inexperience of the heavy artillery available for this operation, some of whom 'had never fired in France'). The heavy artillery began registering their targets and firing a slow bombardment on 16 July, then the following day a special programme began, seven hours before the infantry was due to go 'over the top'. Bad weather caused a two-day postponement of the attack. Although the bombardment appeared to have been effective, when the infantry attacked on 19 July they found much of the German parapet and barbed wire undamaged. Some parties managed to penetrate the German position, but all gains had been lost by the following morning.

The battery transferred to 52nd HAG with Second Army on 4 August and remained with it in the Ypres Salient until the end of the year. On 2 October 1916 the battery was made up to six guns by the addition of a section from 175th Heavy Bty just arrived from England. (Note: 175th Heavy Bty had been formed at Woolwich on 8 May 1916; its other sections were posted to 116th and 147th (Leicester) Heavy Btys.)

==== Messines ====
52nd HAG moved to Fourth Army in December 1916, but 2/1st Lancashire Hvy Bty remained behind, serving with Second Army Artillery School from 13 January to 19 February 1917. It then moved to VIII Corps Heavy Artillery, joining 71st HAG. Second Army's artillery was involved in a complex fireplan preceding the Battle of Messines, starting on 21 May, and increasing to eight days of intensive fire from 31 May, with over 200 German battery positions being intensively shelled on 5 and 6 June, continuing after the attack commenced. The artillery effect was as great as the huge mines that were fired under the German front line at Zero hour on 7 June, and the attack was an outstanding success.

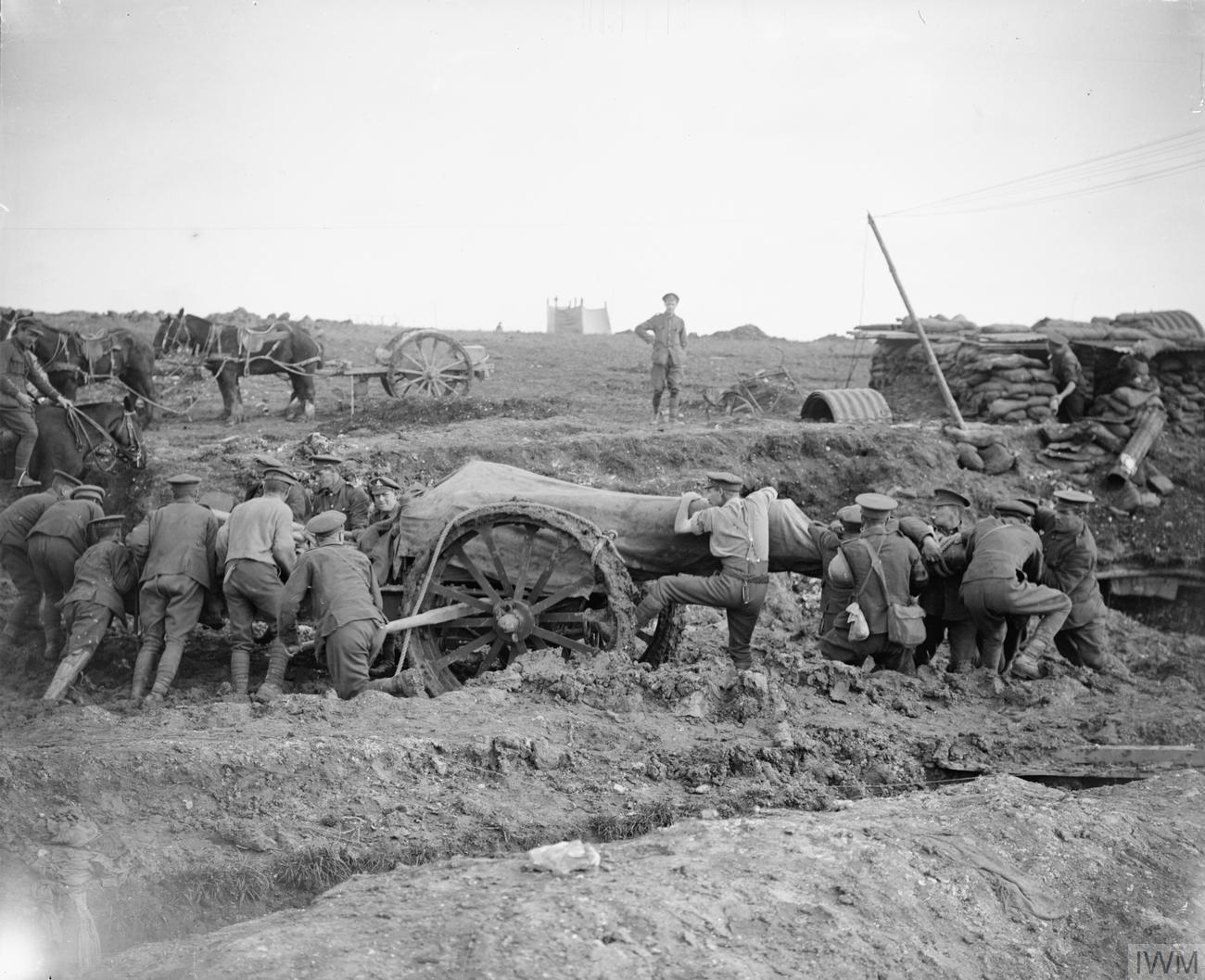
Moving a 60-pounder in mud

The battery moved to Fifth Army after Messines, first with 85th HAG, then to 92nd HAG on 4 July, in time to be involved in the artillery preparation for the Third Ypres Offensive. This began on 16 July, but did not have the advantages of Messines: the Ypres salient was overlooked, and the guns suffered badly from German CB fire. The opening attack on 1 August was only a partial success, and the offensive quickly bogged down as the weather broke. 2/1st Lancashire Hvy Bty was pulled out of the Salient on 21 September when it transferred to 21st HAG with Third Army.

The battery remained with Third Army for the rest of the year, including the Cambrai battles, during which it transferred to 78th HAG on 21 November, and finally transferred to 17th HAG on 25 December. 17th HAG became 17th (Mixed) Bde, RGA, in February 1918, and fought with Third Army until the Armistice.

Postwar the 2/1st Battery was disbanded on 14 October 1919.

=== 2/2nd Lancashire Heavy Battery ===
The 2/2nd Hvy Bty joined 66th (2nd East Lancs) Division after it concentrated for home defence with Second Army, Central Force, in Kent and Sussex in August 1915. The battery was stationed at Plaw Hatch on the edge of Ashdown Forest. It was not until 7 January 1916 that the battery received four worn-out 4.7-inch guns for practising gunlaying drill. In 1916 the division came under Southern Army (Home Forces) and moved to the East Coast defences accompanied by 2/1st and 2/2nd London Hvy Batteries, while 2/2nd Lancashire Hvy Bty transferred to 67th (2nd Home Counties) Division.

67th Division was based in Kent, and from September 1916 the battery was at Upstreet Camp and at Minster. When 67th Division was reorganised as a training formation after August 1917, the battery came under the command of Kent Force, Eastern Command. Towards the end of the war, while still at Minster, the battery was attached to the Cyclist Division. It remained on home defence until demobilisation at Sandling, Folkestone, on 11 October 1919.

== Postwar ==
The 1st Line units of the Lancashire Heavy Brigade, RGA, were placed in suspended animation when they were demobilised in 1919. After the TF was re-established after the war, the two batteries of the brigade were combined with the two prewar batteries of the Liverpool-based 4th West Lancashire (Howitzer) Brigade, Royal Field Artillery, to form the 4th West Lancashire Medium Brigade, RGA, consisting of one battery of 60-pounders and three of 6-inch howitzers. A former officer of the 4th West Lancs was authorised to raise this unit on 21 May 1920 at his unit's drill hall at The Grange, Edge Lane, Liverpool. When the TF was reorganised as the Territorial Army (TA) the following year, the brigade was redesignated 59th (4th West Lancs) Medium Brigade, RGA (TA) (the former 4th West Lancs fought hard to get their 'Old Fourth' number included in the title). The brigade went on to win the prestigious King's Cup on two occasions in the 1930s, and spun off three medium regiments that fought with distinction at Dunkirk, Crete, East Africa, Tobruk and North West Europe during the Second World War.

== Insignia ==
The Lancashire AVCs all seem to have worn the same badge on the 'bomb'-shaped busby plume holder and waistbelt clasp: this consisted of a cannon with a pile of cannonballs to the left and a Lancashire rose above, surrounded by a circle bearing the words 'LANCASHIRE VOLUNTEER ARTILLERY' (see above).
