= 25th Raider Infantry Brigade =

Military unit in Indonesia

25th Raider Infantry Brigade (Siwah)
- Founded: December 28, 2017
- Country: Indonesia
- Branch: Indonesian Army
- Type: Infantry Combat Unit
- Size: Brigade
- Garrison/HQ: Lhoksukon, North Aceh
- Motto: Siwah
- Website: www.kodam-im.mil.id

The 25th Infantry Brigade / Siwah or 25th Raiser Infantry Brigade / Siwah is an organic Indonesian Army Brigade under the Kodam Iskandar Muda. It is in charge of 3 Infantry Battalions: 111th Raider infantry Battalion / Karma Bhakti, 113th Raider Infantry Battalion / Jaya Sakti and 114th Raider Infantry battalion/ Satria Musara). These units were previously under 11th Military Resort Command/Lilawangsa. It is led by Commander Maj. Gen. Moch. Fachrudin S. Sos who was assigned the post on Thursday, December 28, 2017.

== Organic Battalions ==
This brigade consists of 3 Infantry Battalions:

- 111th Raider Infantry Battalion/Karma Bhakti in Tualang Cut, Aceh Tamiang.
- 113th Raider Infantry Battalion/Jaya Sakti in July, Bireun.
- 114th Raider Infantry Battalion/Satria Musara in Reumbele, Bener Meriah.

== Commander ==
- Colonel Inf Asep Sukarna (December 28, 2017 -)
