= The 25th Hour (disambiguation) =

The 25th Hour is a 2001 novel by David Benioff.

The 25th Hour may also refer to:

- 25th Hour, a 2002 American film by Spike Lee, based on Benioff's novel
- The 25th Hour (film), a 1967 film starring Anthony Quinn
  - The 25th Hour, a 1949 novel by Constantin Virgil Gheorghiu and the basis for the 1967 film
- The 25th Hour (Vision Divine album), a 2007 heavy metal album
- The 25th Hour (Terror album), a 2015 hardcore punk album
- The 25th Hour, a fictional island in The Books of Abarat by Clive Barker
- "25th Hour", a song by Reks from Rhythmatic Eternal King Supreme

== See also ==
- Hour 25, a US radio program about science-fiction
