= 25th Street station (Charlotte) =

Light rail station in North Carolina, United States

25th Street
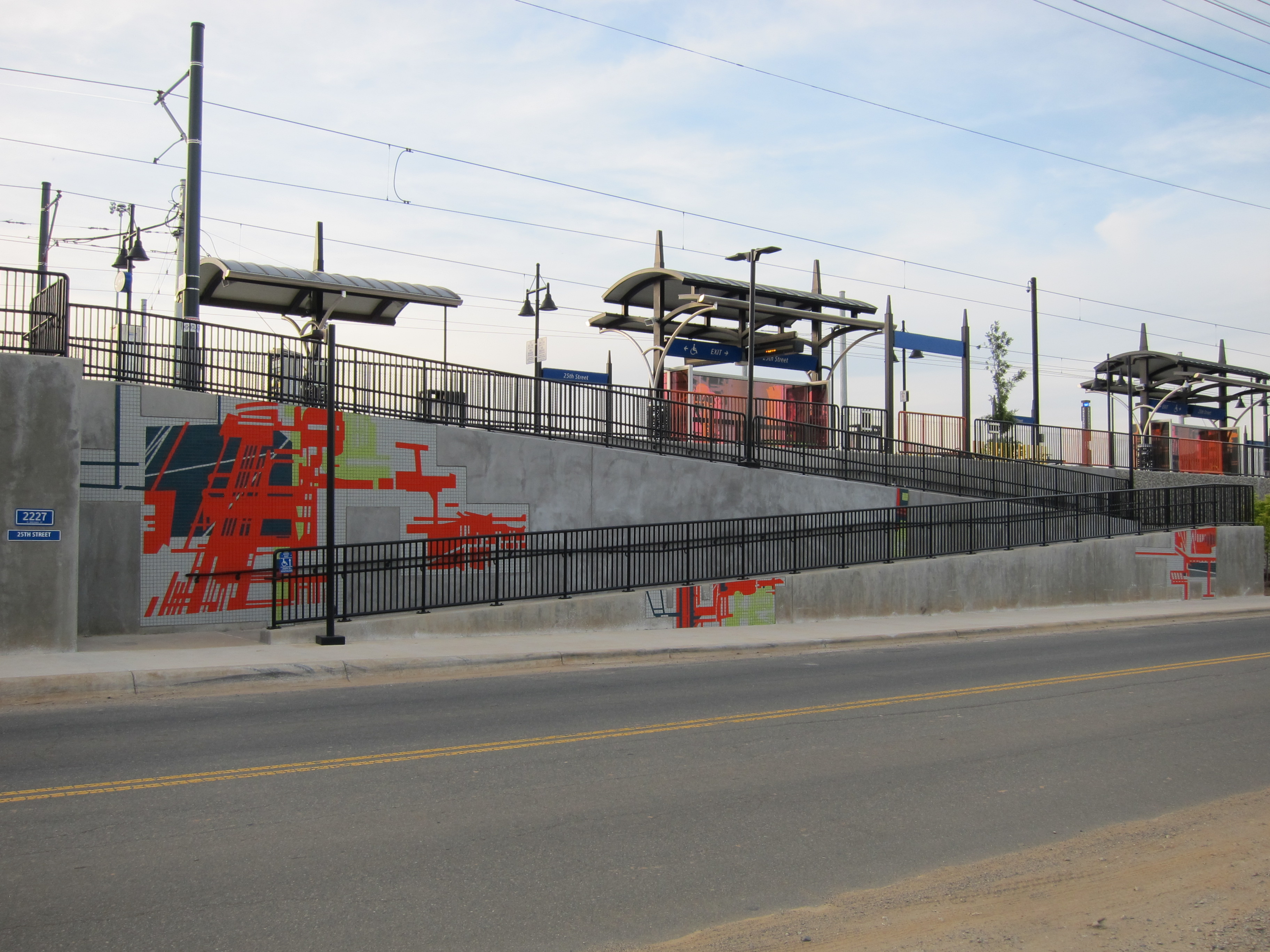

General information
- Location: 2227 North Brevard Street; Charlotte, North Carolina; United States
- Coordinates: 35.2417°N 80.8171°W
- Owner: Charlotte Area Transit System
- Platforms: 1 island platform
- Tracks: 2

Construction
- Structure type: At-grade
- Cycle facilities: Bicycle racks
- Accessible: yes
- Architect: STV Inc.
- Architectural style: Postmodern

History
- Opened: March 16, 2018

Services
| Preceding station | CATS | Following station |
|---|---|---|
| Parkwood toward I-485/South Boulevard | Lynx Blue Line | 36th Street toward UNC Charlotte–Main |
Location

25th Street is a light rail station on the LYNX Blue Line in the Optimist Park neighborhood of Charlotte, North Carolina, United States. It opened on March 16, 2018, as part of the Blue Line extension to the UNC Charlotte campus. The station features an island platform and is located in Optimist Park.
