= 25 =

Twenty-five or 25 may refer to:

- 25 (number), the natural number following 24 and preceding 26
- one of the years 25 BC, AD 25, 1925, 2025

== Science ==
- Manganese, a transition metal in the periodic table
- 25 Phocaea, an asteroid in the asteroid belt

== Music ==
=== Albums ===
- Twenty Five (album), a 2006 greatest hits album by George Michael
  - Twenty Five (video), released alongside the George Michael album
- 25 (A-ha album), 2010
- 25 (Adele album), 2015
- 25 (Blues Traveler album), 2012
- 25 (G Herbo album), 2021
- 25 (Harry Connick, Jr. album), 1992
- 25 (Oysterband album), 2003
- 25 (Patty Larkin album), 2010
- 25 (EP), a 2014 EP by Song Ji-eun
- Mina 25, a 1983 album by Mina

=== Songs ===
- "25" (song), a song by Rod Wave from Last Lap, 2024
- "25", a song by The Kooks from 10 Tracks to Echo in the Dark (2022)
- "25", a song by The Pretty Reckless from Death by Rock and Roll, 2021
- "25", a song by The Smith Street Band from More Scared of You Than You Are of Me, 2017
- "Twenty Five", a song by Karma to Burn from the album Wild, Wonderful Purgatory, 1999

== Other uses ==
- Twenty-five (card game), the Irish national card game
- "Twenty Five" (The West Wing), a 2003 episode of the television series The West Wing
- Renault 25, an executive liftback
- Rover 25, a hatchback
- Twentyfive.7, a township in Selangor, Malaysia

== See also ==
- List of highways numbered 25
- 25th (disambiguation)
