= Egyptian 25th Brigade ambush =

1973 battle of the Yom Kippur War

Coordinates: 30.3302°N 32.4577°E

- Part of the Yom Kippur War
Date	October 17, 1973
Location	East of the Great Bitter Lake, the Sinai Peninsula, Egypt
Result	Israeli victory

Belligerents
Israel	Egypt

Commanders and leaders
Avraham Adan	Ahmad Halamni Hassan

Strength
162nd Division (Centurion, M60 Patton, M48 tanks)	25th Brigade (94 T-62 tanks and 40 APCs)

Casualties and losses
3 tanks destroyed	60 tanks destroyed, other military vehicles destroyed

Egyptian 25th Brigade ambush was a battle that occurred on October 17, 1973, the eleventh day of the Yom Kippur War, east of the Great Bitter Lake, in the Sinai Peninsula. The ambush was conducted by the Israel Defense Forces' 162nd Division, against the 25th Brigade of the Egyptian army. The Israelis' goal was the destruction of the brigade, which attempted to disrupt the Israeli crossing of the Suez Canal.

== Battle ==
After a string of counterattacks by Egyptian ground forces during the Israeli offensive in the Yom-Kippur War, Israeli Defense Forces were eager to put an end to such counterattacks. On October 17, 1973, Israeli forces conducted an ambush against Egyptian tank divisions commanded by Ahmad Halalmi Hassan, whose force consisted of 94 Soviet made T-62's and 40 other armored APC's, as they were advancing towards Israeli-occupied territories in the Sinai. The Israeli forces consisted of 14 M60 Patton Tanks, they conducted the ambush by creating an "L" formation and attacking from a location in which the Egyptian Tank Brigade had not anticipated a hostile presence. Because the Israeli forces were outnumbered in the battle, they used tactics wherein their tanks peeked out over the hill, fired one shot, then descended to take cover from enemy fire, this process would be repeated by every tank in Avraham's contingent. In the end the Egyptian advance was halted after suffering heavy losses, while the Israeli forces suffered only three tanks lost.

== Outcome ==
In the end the battle was a victory for the Israel Defense Forces, because they had caused heavy losses to the Egyptian Forces and pushed them onto the defensive. This battle is a key turning point in the war.

== Sources ==
- Avraham Adan, On the Banks of the Suez, Presidio Press (Reprint edition), 1991.
- Elyashiv Sunny, All are looking at them: the brigade commanders on the battlefield, Tel Aviv: Ministry of Defense, 2006.
- Elyashiv Sunny, The power to decide: the division commanders on the battlefield, Tel Aviv: Ministry of Defense, 2007.
