= 25th Street Station (Baltimore) =

Coordinates: 39°19.1′0″N 76°37.2′0″W

25th Street Station was a proposed mixed use development to be located in the Remington, Old Goucher, and Charles Village neighborhoods of central Baltimore. It received final design approval from Baltimore's Planning Commission on December 16, 2010, and was to commence construction in early 2011, with a 2012 opening. The development would have included 330,000 square feet (31,000 m^{2}) of retail space, including a Walmart and Lowe's as anchor tenants, with an array of smaller retailers and 70 apartments. As of October 2011 construction of 25th Street Station has not begun yet and the Lowe's is no longer an anchor.

On May 20, 2014, the project's primary developer, WV Urban Developments, withdrew from the project, citing numerous ongoing legal issues and challenges as the cause. The WV Urban's project manager for the site upon the announcement of its withdrawal stated, "WV Urban Developments is no longer pursuing its 25th Street Station project. As you are well aware, the project has been the target of numerous appeals and filings by opponents, which have delayed the project for years." The appeals were stated to "have contributed to an environment sufficiently uncertain that the relevant parties are unable to reach the agreements necessary for WV to continue." WV Urban Developments had spent more than $5 million in planning costs and attorney's fees defending the project against lawsuits that had been dismissed but appealed.

As of August 2015, the 25th Street Station project is essentially dead, as WV Urban Developments sold the land that was to be used for the 25th Street Station project to a new developer, Seawall Development Co. (who has a proven track record of locally-oriented development and community engagement within Baltimore City) in late-2014 who on March 17, 2015 agreed with the communities that surrounded this project that they would not develop the property in accordance to the 25th Street Station PUD and the November 21, 2013 decision by the Baltimore City Planning Commission (essentially killing the proposed Walmart that was highly controversial from the original proposal) and would not oppose to a potential action by the Baltimore City Council and the Planning Commission to cancel or repeal the 25th Street Station PUD in exchange for the dismissal of two appeals pending within the Maryland Court of Special Appeals that was filed in opposition of the 25th Street Station project.

The proposed site is bounded by West 25th Street to the north, Maryland Avenue to the east, West 24th Street to the south, and the CSX Railroad line to the west.

== Project history ==
Anderson Automotive, a car dealership that sells General Motors and Honda automobiles, currently occupies the 11-acre site where in the development was to be built. In mid-2009, GM informed Anderson that they planned to discontinue selling automobiles at that location, ending a 90-year relationship there. Anderson subsequently announced that it would also relocate its Honda dealership from Howard & 25th Streets to Hunt Valley, Maryland, north of Baltimore; it had been in operation for 15 years. During fall 2009, it was announced that Anderson intended to sell the property to a developer, who would construct a Lowe's home improvement store, a supermarket, other retail spaces and apartments. (However, Anderson still has dealership clusters in Hunt Valley and Abingdon, selling both GM and Honda vehicles.) On February 26, 2010, the Baltimore Sun revealed that a Walmart store would join Lowe's as an anchor tenant. On October 17, 2011, the Baltimore Sun reported that Lowe's decided to drop out of the 25th Street Station project and that construction hasn't begun due to "court challenges," however the loss of Lowe's was reported to not put the project in jeopardy. In the meantime, the original Anderson building that formerly functioned as a showroom for its GM cars has been re-purposed as a body shop and service center for all GM and Honda vehicles; the Honda building, which was fronted by a used-car lot after the dealership's relocation, is now an MTA Maryland bus depot.

== Opposition and support ==
Opposition to the project centered on the inclusion of Walmart as an anchor tenant and the potential impacts of big box retail on smaller, mom-and-pop stores in historic business districts. Residents in the neighborhoods surrounding the development voiced concerns about the inevitable increase in traffic, noise, and light pollution the high-intensity uses would bring. Still others were concerned that the shopping center's actual design was too suburban in nature and not suitable for a dense, urban environment. Support for the project focused on the construction and permanent jobs that the development would create, and the convenience of being able to shop inside city limits, when many city residents are forced to drive to the surrounding suburbs to shop at comparable stores. However, there had been a Walmart in Port Covington, located off Hanover Street south of downtown Baltimore, which was one of 269 stores that were closed nationwide in early 2016; and currently, main rival Target has one city location, in Canton; a former Target location at Mondawmin Mall was closed in February 2018. Both companies also have numerous locations in neighboring Baltimore and Anne Arundel Counties.

Heated debate about the merits and drawbacks of the developer's plans continued throughout most of 2010. The project was granted design approval by the Urban Design and Architectural Review Panel (UDARP) in October 2010. Public hearings and meetings concerning the project were held by the Planning Commission and City Council. The City Council approved the Planned Unit Development ordinance in November 2010. The final design and a minor amendment were approved by the Planning Commission on December 16, 2010.
