= 25th Regiment =

25th Regiment may refer to:

== Infantry regiments ==
- 25th Infantry Regiment (Argentina)
- 25th Independent Mixed Regiment, a Japanese unit
- 25th Infantry Regiment (United States)
- 25th Regiment of Foot, a British Army unit
- 25th Punjabis, a British Indian Army unit
- 25th Continental Regiment, a unit during the American Revolutionary War

=== Units during the American Civil War ===
- 25th Arkansas Infantry Regiment, a Confederate Army unit

==== Union Army ====
- 25th Connecticut Infantry Regiment
- 25th Illinois Infantry Regiment
- 25th Indiana Infantry Regiment
- 25th Iowa Infantry Regiment
- 25th Massachusetts Infantry Regiment
- 25th Kentucky Infantry Regiment
- 25th Maine Infantry Regiment
- 25th Michigan Infantry Regiment
- 25th New Jersey Infantry Regiment
- 25th New York Infantry Regiment
- 25th Wisconsin Infantry Regiment

== Other regiments ==
- 25th Aviation Regiment (United States)
- 25th Dragoons, a British Army cavalry unit
- 25th Field Artillery Regiment, United States
- 25th Greater Poland Uhlan Regiment
- 25th SS Police Regiment, Germany

== See also ==
- 25th Army (disambiguation)
- 25th Brigade (disambiguation)
- XXV Corps (disambiguation)
- 25 Squadron (disambiguation)
