= 25 Squadron =

25 Squadron may refer to:

== Air Force Squadrons ==
- No. 25 Squadron PAF
- No. 25 Squadron RAF
- No. 25 Squadron RAAF
- No. 25 Squadron RNZAF
