= 25th Battalion =

25th Battalion may refer to:

- 25th Battalion (Australia), an infantry battalion of the Australian Army that served during World War I as part of the AIF and World War II as part of the Militia (separate to 2/25th)
- 25th Battalion (New Zealand), an infantry battalion of the New Zealand Military Forces that served during World War II as part of the 2nd New Zealand Expeditionary Force
- 25th/49th Battalion, Royal Queensland Regiment, a Reserve light infantry battalion in the Australian Army that currently exists
- 2/25th Battalion (Australia), a World War II Australian Army unit
- 25th Signal Battalion (United States), a former equipped signal battalion in the United States Army
- 25th (Frontiersmen) Battalion, Royal Fusiliers, a British Army unit that served during World War I
- 25th Battalion (Nova Scotia Rifles), CEF
