= John Du Cane =

British Army general

General Sir John Du Cane GCB
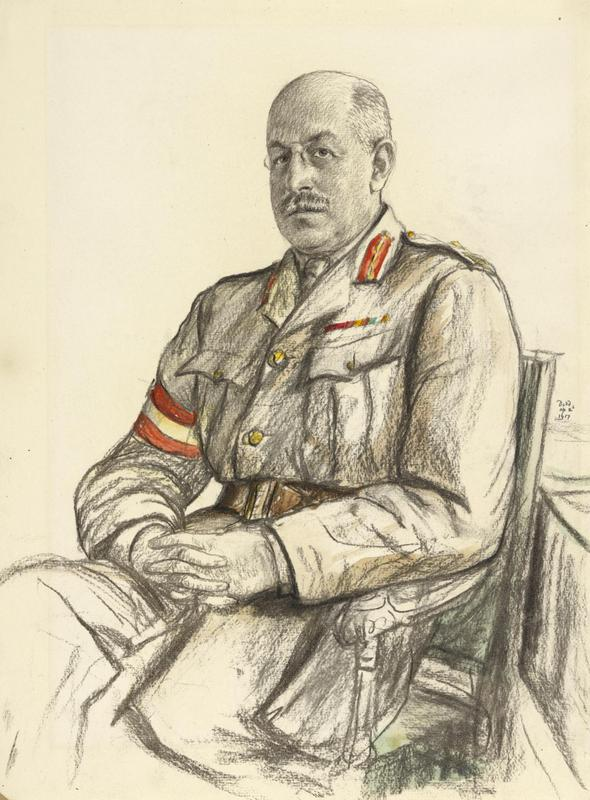
- Major-General Sir John Philip Du Cane, by Francis Dodd
- Born: 5 May 1865; South Kensington, London, England
- Died: 5 April 1947 (aged 81); Westminster, London, England
- Relatives: Hubert John Du Cane (cousin)
- Military career
- Allegiance: United Kingdom
- Branch: British Army
- Service years: 1884–1931
- Rank: General
- Unit: Royal Artillery
- Commands: Malta; British Army of the Rhine; Western Command; XV Corps
- Conflicts: Second Boer War; First World War
- Awards: Knight Grand Cross of the Order of the Bath; Mentioned in Despatches

General Sir John Philip Du Cane, GCB (5 May 1865 – 5 April 1947) was a British Army officer. He held high rank during the First World War, most notably as Major General Royal Artillery at General Headquarters in 1915 when the British Expeditionary Force was rapidly expanding, as General Officer Commanding XV Corps from 1916 to 1918, then from April 1918 as liaison officer between Field Marshal Sir Douglas Haig and the Allied Generalissimo Ferdinand Foch. After the war he was Master-General of the Ordnance.

== Military career ==
After attending the Royal Military Academy, Woolwich, Du Cane was commissioned a lieutenant in the Royal Artillery in February 1884, promoted to captain on 4 March 1893, and, made an adjutant in February 1894, became a major on 14 February 1900.

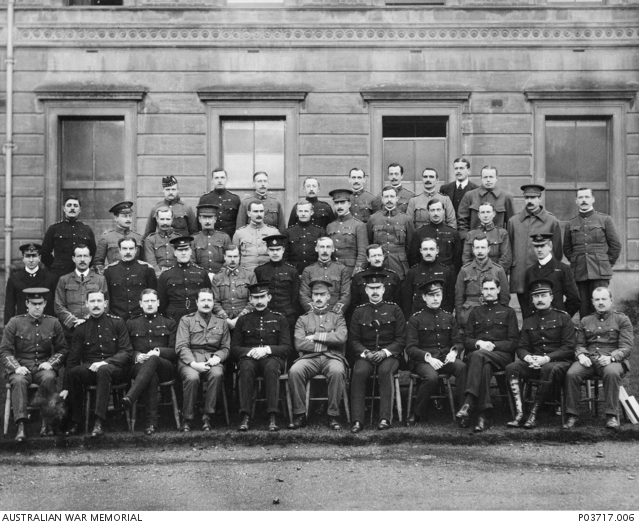
Group portrait of officers at the British Staff College at Camberley, England, 1906. John Du Cane, then a colonel, is sat in the front row, fifth from the left.

Du Cane served in the Second Boer War, and was appointed a staff officer for lines of communication in South Africa in September 1900. Following the end of hostilities in early June 1902, he left Cape Town on board the SS Assaye, and arrived at Southampton the next month. He was mentioned in despatches and received a brevet promotion to lieutenant colonel in the South Africa honours list published on 26 June 1902.

He served as a brigade major, Royal Artillery, with the 1st Army Corps in April 1904, in which role he succeeded Brevet Lieutenant Colonel Neil Douglas Findlay. He then served at the Staff College, Camberley, as a deputy assistant adjutant general (DAAG) from April 1905 – 1907. He was promoted again to major in January 1908, and full colonel later that month. He then became a general staff officer, grade 1 (GSO1) at army headquarters.

Having been made a Companion of the Order of the Bath (CB) in June 1910, Du Cane was promoted in February 1911 to the temporary rank of brigadier general and succeeded Sir Godfrey Thomas, 9th Baronet as commander, Royal Artillery (CRA) for the 3rd Division. In July 1912 he became staff officer to the inspector general of Home Forces, or brigadier general, general staff, taking over from Brigadier General David Henderson.

Du Cane served in the First World War, initially as BGGS of III Corps, commanded by Lieutenant General Sir William Pulteney, of the British Expeditionary Force (BEF). In 1915, after being promoted to major general in February, as major general, Royal Artillery, he was an artillery advisor at General Headquarters; Lieutenant General Sir William Robertson, chief of staff to the BEF in 1915, later stated that he had laid the organisational groundwork for the massive expansion of BEF artillery during the war. He was appointed a Knight Commander of the Order of the Bath (KCB) in June 1916 in the 1916 Birthday Honours.

He was posted to the Ministry of Munitions in 1916 and then, after being promoted to temporary lieutenant general, became general officer commanding (GOC) of XV Corps in September 1916, after Sir Henry Horne went to command the First Army. In that capacity, he was closely involved in Operation Hush, a planned invasion on the Belgian coast. On 12 April 1918, against the backdrop of the German "Georgette" Offensive and Field Marshal Sir Douglas Haig's demands for French reinforcements, he was appointed liaison officer between Haig and the Allied generalissimo, Ferdinand Foch.

After the war, Du Cane, promoted to the permanent rank of lieutenant-general in January 1919, made his home in London at 4 Upper Brook Street, Mayfair. Du Cane was appointed Master-General of the Ordnance in January 1920 and then general officer commanding-in-chief for Western Command in October 1923. He was GOC-in-C for the British Army of the Rhine from June 1924 until May 1927 when he became governor and commander-in-chief of Malta, during which time he was promoted to general. He was also aide-de-camp general to the King, taking over from General Sir Francis Davies, from April 1926 to 1930. He was promoted to Knight Grand Cross of the Order of the Bath (GCB) in the 1928 Birthday Honours. He retired from the army in June 1931.

General election 1923: Horncastle
Party	Candidate	Votes	%	±%
Liberal	Samuel Pattinson	10,954	54.5	+0.4
Unionist	John Du Cane	9,135	45.5	−0.4
Majority		1,819	9.0	+0.8
Turnout		20,089	80.9	−0.6
Registered electors		24,821		
Liberal hold		Swing	+0.4	

== Works ==
- DuCane, Lt. General Sir John, Marshal Foch, London: privately printed, 1920

== Sources ==
- Harris, J.P. (2008). Douglas Haig and the First World War (2009 ed.). Cambridge University Press. ISBN 978-0-521-89802-7.
- Robertson, Sir William Robert (1921). From Private to Field Marshal. London: Constable. ASIN B008TCWACC.

Military offices
Preceded by Henry Horne	GOC XV Corps; 1916–1918	Succeeded by Sir Henry Beauvoir De Lisle
Preceded by Sir William Furse	Master-General of the Ordnance; 1920–1923	Succeeded by Sir Noel Birch
Preceded by Sir Beauvoir De Lisle	GOC-in-C Western Command; 1923–1924	Succeeded by Sir Richard Butler
Preceded by Sir Alexander Godley	Commander-in-Chief of the British Army of the Rhine; 1924–1927	Succeeded by Sir William Thwaites
Government offices
Preceded by Sir Walter Congreve	Governor of Malta; 1927–1931	Succeeded by Sir David Campbell
