= Percy Hambro =

British Army officer (1870–1931)

Major-General Sir Percy Hambro KBE CB CMG
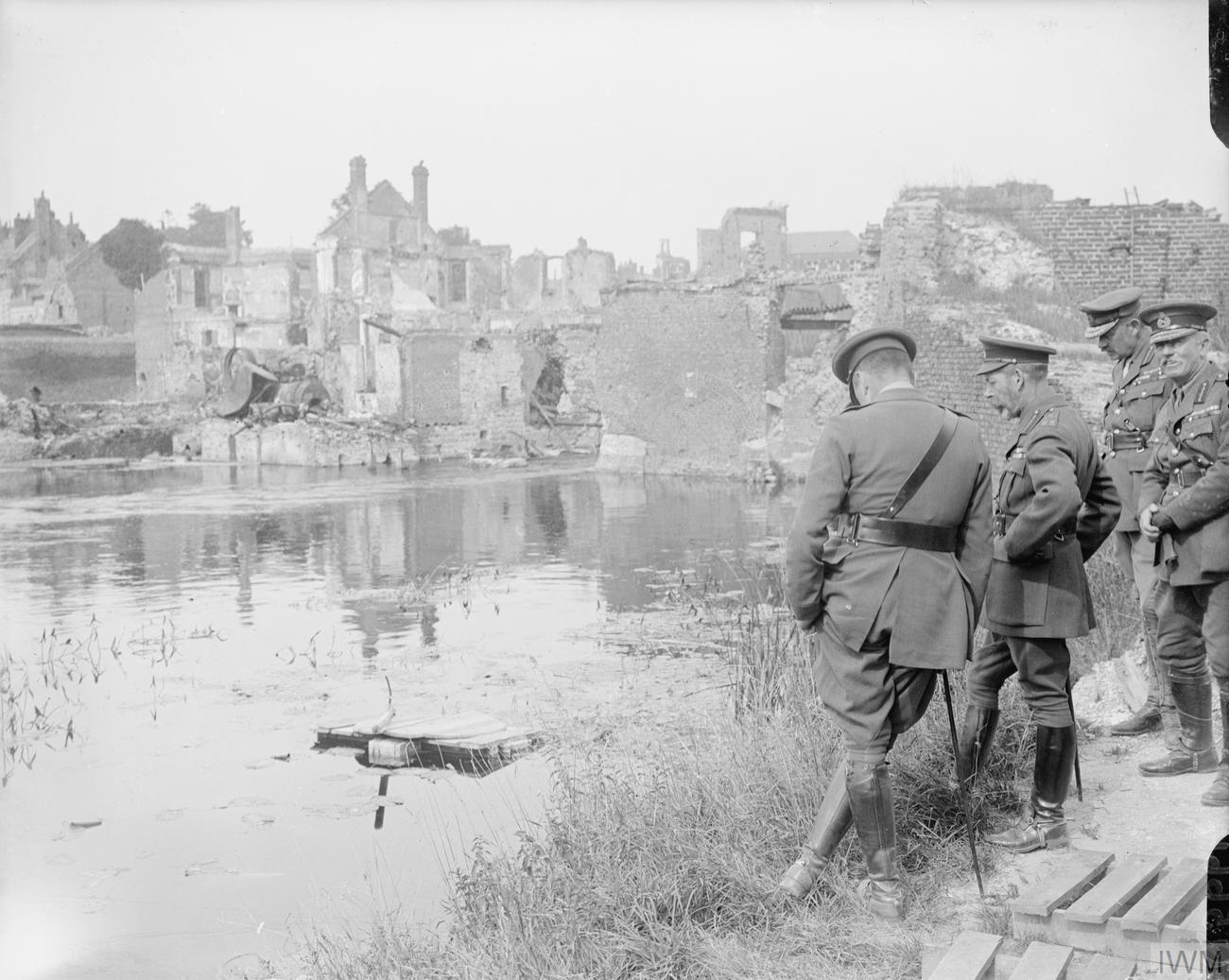
- King George V visiting the ruins of Peronne, 13 July 1917; with him are Lieutenant-General William Pulteney, GOC III Corps, and Brigadier-General Percy Hambro, the Quartermaster-General of III Corps
- Born: 10 December 1870; Andover, Hampshire
- Died: 25 November 1931 (aged 60)
- Military career
- Allegiance: United Kingdom
- Branch: British Army
- Rank: Major-General
- Commands: 46th (North Midland) Division
- Conflicts: Second Boer War
- Awards: Knight Commander of the Order of the British Empire; Companion of the Order of the Bath; Companion of the Order of St Michael and St George

Major-General Sir Percival Otway Hambro, KBE, CB, CMG (10 December 1870 – 25 November 1931) was a British Army officer.

== Military career ==
Educated at Eton College, Hambro was commissioned into the 4th Battalion, the Cameronians (Scottish Rifles) before transferring to the 15th The King's Hussars on 18 June 1892.

After serving in the Second Boer War, he saw action as Quarter-Master General for the 3rd Division on the Western Front during First World War for which he was appointed a Companion of the Order of St Michael and St George. He had been made a brevet lieutenant colonel in June 1915, and a temporary brigadier general in November when he became deputy adjutant and quartermaster general of III Corps.

After the war he was promoted to substantive colonel on 2 June 1919 and took charge of logistics in Baghdad and was placed on half-pay on 1 April 1924. He was promoted to major general on 2 June. He became major general, administration at Aldershot Command in November 1925 and general officer commanding (GOC) of the 46th (North Midland) Division in May 1927, an appointment he vacated on 15 May 1931 when he retired from the army.

Military offices
Preceded by Casimir van Straubenzee	GOC 46th (North Midland) Division; 1927–1931	Succeeded by Oswald Borrett
