= 139th (Sherwood Foresters) Brigade =

Nottinghamshire and Derbyshire Brigade 139th (Sherwood Foresters) Brigade 139th Infantry Brigade
- Active: 1908-1919; 1920-1936; 1939-1946
- Country: United Kingdom
- Branch: Territorial Army
- Type: Infantry
- Size: Brigade
- Part of: 46th (North Midland) Division; 46th Infantry Division

The 139th (Sherwood Foresters) Brigade was an infantry brigade of the British Army that saw active service in the First World War with the 46th (North Midland) Division. Later designated the 139th Infantry Brigade, the brigade also saw service with the 46th Infantry Division in the Second World War.

== Origins ==
When Volunteer Infantry Brigades were introduced in 1888, the Volunteer Battalions of the Sherwood Foresters (Nottinghamshire and Derbyshire Regiment) formed part of the North Midland Brigade, although from 1901 to 1906 they formed a separate Sherwood Foresters Brigade. When the Volunteer Force was subsumed into the new Territorial Force (TF) under the Haldane Reforms in 1908, a new Nottinghamshire and Derbyshire Brigade was formed, as part of the North Midland Division. The brigade was composed of four Volunteer battalions of the Sherwood Foresters: the 5th (Derbyshire), 6th, 7th (Robin Hood Rifles) and 8th.

== First World War ==
King George V inspected the division on 19 February 1915, shortly before its departure for France, and gave permission for the Notts & Derby Brigade to change its title to Sherwood Foresters Brigade. (However, its 2nd Line duplicate, formed in January 1915, remained the 2/1st Notts & Derby Brigade throughout the war.) In May, when the TF formations were numbered, the brigade became 139th (Sherwood Foresters) Brigade in the 46th (North Midland) Division.

The brigade saw service with the 46th Division throughout the First World War in the trenches of the Western Front from 1915 to 1918.

=== Order of battle, First World War ===
- 1/5th Battalion, Sherwood Foresters (Nottinghamshire and Derbyshire Regiment)
- 1/6th Battalion, Sherwood Foresters (Nottinghamshire and Derbyshire Regiment)
- 1/7th (Robin Hood Rifles) Battalion, Sherwood Foresters (Nottinghamshire and Derbyshire Regiment) (left February 1918)
- 1/8th Battalion, Sherwood Foresters (Nottinghamshire and Derbyshire Regiment)
- 1/4th Battalion, Black Watch (Royal Highlanders) (joined and left November 1915)
- 1/3rd (City of London) Battalion, London Regiment (Royal Fusiliers) (joined and left November 1915)
- 139th Machine Gun Company, Machine Gun Corps (formed 16 February 1916, moved to 46th Battalion, Machine Gun Corps 26 February 1918)
- 139th Trench Mortar Battery (formed 9 March 1916)

== Between the wars ==
Disbanded after the war in 1919, the brigade was reformed as the 139th (Nottinghamshire and Derbyshire) Infantry Brigade in the Territorial Army and again assigned to the 46th (North Midland) Division. However, in 1936 the division was disbanded and its HQ was redesignated 2nd Anti-Aircraft Division. The 6th and 7th Sherwood Foresters were both transferred to the Royal Engineers and converted into anti-aircraft searchlight battalions. The 5th and 8th Sherwood Foresters were both transferred to the 49th (West Riding) Infantry Division. With all of its battalions posted away, the 139th Infantry Brigade was disbanded.

== Second World War ==
The brigade number was reactivated again when the Territorial Army was doubled in size in spring and summer 1939, in order to meet the threat of Nazi Germany. The 139th Infantry Brigade, formed as a 2nd Line duplicate of 148th Infantry Brigade, was assigned to the 46th Infantry Division, which itself was formed as a duplicate of the 49th Division.

The brigade saw service with the 46th Division throughout the Second World War, which began in September 1939. Sent to France with the rest of 46th Division in April 1940 to join the British Expeditionary Force (BEF), the brigade was both poorly equipped and trained and lacked any of their signals, artillery, engineer or other support units. The division was sent, along with the 12th and 23rd divisions, to complete their training and to help construct defences and airfields. As a result, the division was battered when facing the German Army's blitzkrieg during the Battle of France in May 1940 and was forced to retreat to Dunkirk had to be evacuated to England.

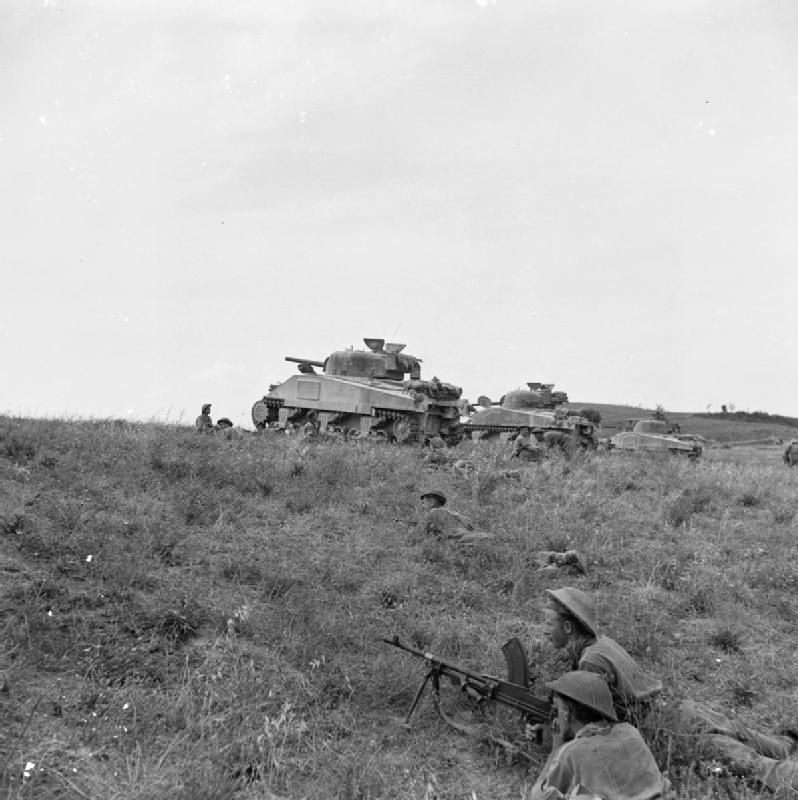
Sherman tanks supporting infantrymen of the 2/5th Battalion, Leicestershire Regiment, 46th Division, near Coldazzo on the Gothic Line, 30 August 1944.

After being evacuated, the brigade and division spent the next few years on home defence and training to repel an expected German invasion which never arrived. In late 1942 the 46th Division was sent to North Africa where it became part of British First Army and saw action in the final stages of the Tunisia Campaign. The division did not see service in Sicily but landed at Salerno in September 1943 as part of the US Fifth Army during the initial invasion of Italy. The brigade saw service in Italy until late 1944, transferring to Greece to help calm the Greek Civil War, and returning to Italy in April 1945 for the final offensive, but did not take part in any actual fighting.

=== Order of battle, Second World War ===
Th brigade was constituted as follows:

- 2/5th Battalion, Leicestershire Regiment
- 2/5th Battalion, Sherwood Foresters (redesignated 5th Battalion on 1 March 1943)
- 9th Battalion, Sherwood Foresters (until 28 December 1939)
- 139th Infantry Brigade Anti-Tank Company (formed 17 August 1940, joined 46th Reconnaissance Battalion 10 July 1941)
- 16th Battalion, Durham Light Infantry (from 28 December 1940)

From 23 December 1942 to 3 February 1943 the brigade was constituted as a brigade group with the following additional units under command:

- 70th (West Riding) Field Regiment, Royal Artillery
- 229th Anti-Tank Battery, Royal Artillery
- 379th Light Anti-Aircraft Battery, Royal Artillery
- 270th Field Company, Royal Engineers
- C Squadron, 46th Recce Regiment

== Commanders ==
- 1911–1917: Charles Tyrell Shipley
- 1917–1918: George Glas Sandeman Carey
- 1918–1918: Phillip Richard Wood
- 1918–1919: John Harington
- 1920–1924: Godfrey Davenport Goodman
- 1924– : B. A. Smith
- 1940–1943: Raleigh Chichester-Constable
- 1943–1943: Robert Stott
- 1943–1945: Allen Block

== Victoria Cross recipients ==
- Sergeant William Henry Johnson, 1/5th (Derbyshire) Battalion, Sherwood Foresters (Nottinghamshire and Derbyshire Regiment), Great War
- Acting Lieutenant-Colonel Bernard Vann, 1/8th Battalion, Sherwood Foresters (Nottinghamshire and Derbyshire Regiment), Great War
- Captain Geoffrey Vickers, 1/7th (Robin Hood Rifles) Battalion, Sherwood Foresters (Nottinghamshire and Derbyshire Regiment), Great War
