= Hubert Hamilton =

British Army general (1861–1914)

Major-General Hubert Hamilton CB CVO DSO
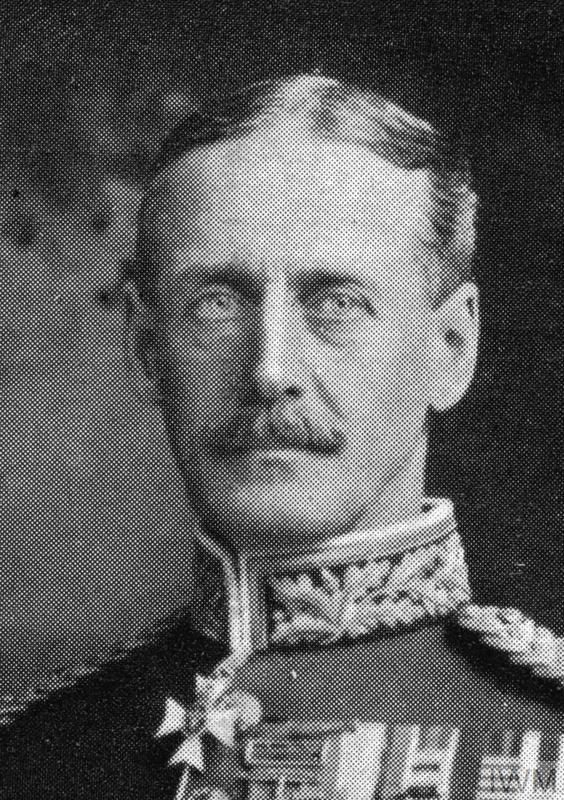
- Born: 27 June 1861; Plymouth, Devon, England
- Died: 14 October 1914 (aged 53); La Couture, France
- Military career
- Allegiance: United Kingdom
- Branch: British Army
- Service years: 1880–1914
- Rank: Major-General
- Nickname: "Hammy"
- Unit: Queen's Royal Regiment (West Surrey)
- Commands: 7th Infantry Brigade; North Midland Division; 3rd Division
- Conflicts: Mahdist War; Battle of Atbara; Battle of Khartoum; Second Boer War; First World War; Battle of Le Cateau; First Battle of the Marne; Race for the Sea †
- Awards: Companion of the Order of the Bath; Commander of the Royal Victorian Order; Distinguished Service Order; Mentioned in dispatches

Major-General Hubert Ion Wetherall Hamilton, CB, CVO, DSO (27 June 1861 – 14 October 1914) was a senior British Army officer who served with distinction throughout his career, seeing battle in the Mahdist War in Egypt and the Second Boer War in South Africa, before being given command of the 3rd Division at the outbreak of the First World War. Just two and a half months later, at the height of the race for the Sea, Hamilton was killed by artillery fire while surveying the front line, the first British divisional commander to be killed in action during the conflict and the second British general to be killed overall. He had received several honours for his service and was popular amongst his men, who nicknamed him "Hammy" and expressed sorrow at his death; each regiment in his division despatched representatives to his funeral, despite being involved in heavy fighting less than a mile away.

== Early life ==
Born on 27 June 1861, Hubert Ion Wetherall Hamilton was the son of General Henry Meade Hamilton, and one of four brothers to enter military service, including Major General Sir Bruce Meade Hamilton. As children the Hamilton brothers were surrounded by military figures; in addition to their father, their brother-in-law was Major General Sir George Pomeroy Colley, who was killed in action at the battle of Majuba Hill in 1881.

Hamilton was educated at Haileybury College and the Royal Military College at Sandhurst, from where he was commissioned into the 2nd Foot Regiment in July 1880.

== Early military career ==
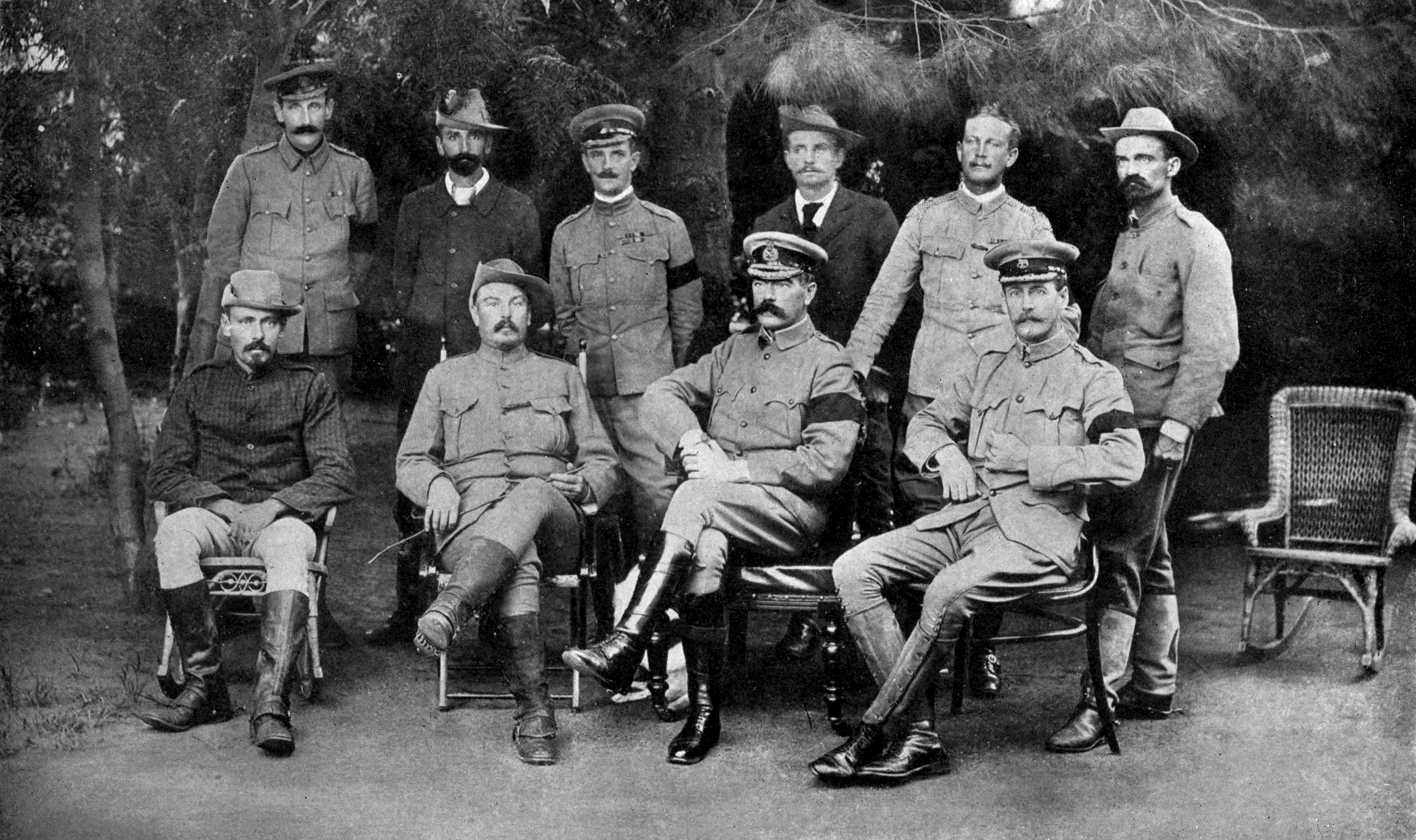
Lord Kitchener at the Peace Conference that ended the Second Boer War. Colonel Hamilton is seated on the extreme right.

In the early 1880s Hamilton travelled to India with his regiment, and there was involved in the Burma Expedition from 1886 to 1888, remaining in the country as adjutant of his regiment from 1886 to 1890 and winning the campaign medal with two clasps. He was promoted to captain in December 1890 and attended the Staff College, Camberley, from 1892–93. By 1896 he was back in England, and was appointed an aide-de-camp to Major-General Thomas Kelly-Kenny, commanding an infantry brigade at Aldershot Garrison.

In the following year, Hamilton was involved in the Mahdist War, when he accompanied Major General Sir Herbert Kitchener's army against the Mahdist forces, fighting at the battle of Atbara, the battle of Omdurman and, in November 1899 as deputy adjutant general (DAG), in the final advance against the Khalifa during the Battle of Umm Diwaykarat. He was mentioned in dispatches (5 September 1898) and rewarded for his service with the Distinguished Service Order (DSO) and the Imperial Ottoman Order (Fourth Class) from the Khedive of Egypt.

In late 1899 Hamilton left Egypt and was immediately engaged in another war, against the Boers in South Africa, where he was again appointed aide-de-camp to Major-General Kelly-Kenny, by now commander of the 6th Division. From January 1900 he was a staff officer with the role of deputy assistant adjutant-general, and performed so well in this position that he was advanced to assistant adjutant-general in July 1900 and recommended to Lord Kitchener as a personal aide-de-camp and military secretary from November 1900. He was engaged in operations in the Orange Free State, Transvaal and Cape Colony and also saw action at the battle of Paardeberg, for which he was mentioned in dispatches three times (31 March 1900, 16 April 1901, 29 July 1902) and awarded the Queen's South Africa Medal with four clasps and King's South Africa Medal with two clasps. For his field service, he was appointed aide-de-camp to the King, and given a brevet promotion to colonel.

With the war's successful conclusion, Hamilton returned home in June 1902, carrying the peace despatches from Lord Kitchener to the government and the King, who received him at Windsor Castle. Less than six months later, Hamilton accompanied Kitchener to India, again as his military secretary, and received the substantive rank of colonel on 28 November 1902. In February 1906 he left Kitchener's service and returned to England to assume command of the 7th Infantry Brigade, and with it came the temporary rank of brigadier general, He was made a Companion of the Order of the Bath (CB) in June. In October 1908 Hamilton left the 7th Brigade for a temporary promotion to major general and an appointment as chief of the general staff in the Mediterranean, in succession to Major General John Maxwell. In April 1909 he was made a Commander of the Royal Victorian Order (CVO). In June his rank of major general became substantive.

His last peacetime appointment was in England, taking over from Brigadier General Hugh Archdale the role of general officer commanding (GOC) of the North Midland Division of the Territorial Force (TF) from January 1911. Hamilton relinquished this assignment and then received command of the 3rd Division, which his brother Bruce had commanded a decade earlier, from Major General Sir Henry Rawlinson in June 1914, in the last weeks of peace before the First World War. It would be his final command.

== First World War ==
At the outbreak of the First World War, just weeks after becoming GOC, Hamilton immediately took his division to France with the rest of the British Expeditionary Force (BEF) in the II Corps, which was then commanded by General Sir Horace Smith-Dorrien, who admired Hamilton.

During August and September, Hamilton's division was almost continuously engaged, fighting at the Battle of Mons, Le Cateau and along the lines of the Marne River. In exhausting combat, casualties were massive and Hamilton came close to death on 26 September when a shell landed just feet away from where he and two other generals were discussing operations. Luckily for them however, the munition did not detonate. Despite the often difficult conditions of the fighting, Hamilton shared his men's hardships and was frequently in the front line, earning the affectionate nickname of "Hammy" from his subordinates.

Hubert Hamilton

1861 – 1914
Question not but live and labour
Till your goal be won
Helping every feeble neighbour,
Seeking help from none.

Hamilton's luck did not last. As British, French and German units raced for the Picardy coast during the race for the Sea, Hamilton's division was in the vanguard and was heavily engaged in the opening weeks of October. On 14 October, Hamilton and several aides-de-camp traveled to the village of La Couture near Béthune on the front lines to witness the situation and had just dismounted from their horses when a large shrapnel shell detonated yards overhead. The officers who accompanied him were unhurt but a single bullet entered Hamilton's forehead, killing him instantly.

The first of nine British divisional commanders to be killed or die of wounds during the war, (Note: The other fatalities were: Samuel Lomax, GOC 1st Division, Thompson Capper, GOC 7th Division, George Thesiger, GOC 9th (Scottish) Division, Frederick Wing, GOC 12th (Eastern) Division, Edward Ingouville-Williams, GOC 34th Division, Robert Broadwood, GOC 57th (2nd West Lancashire) Division, Edward Feetham, GOC 39th Division, and Louis Lipsett, GOC 4th Division, the last and youngest to be killed in the war.) and the second British general killed so far, (Note: The first was Neil Douglas Findlay.) his death caused immediate turmoil in the division’s leadership. He was briefly succeeded as temporary GOC by Brigadier General Frederick McCracken, GOC of the division's 7th Infantry Brigade, then by Major General Colin Mackenzie. He was removed only two weeks later, however, and Major General Frederick Wing, the division's artillery commander, took temporary command before Major General Aylmer Haldane, who had known Hamilton since their time at the Staff College over twenty years before, finally became its new commander.

One of Hamilton's aides, William Congreve, (who would himself go on to win the Victoria Cross almost two years later, like his father, Brigadier General Walter Congreve), wrote in his diary:

14 October, La Couture, Hammy is dead, and we lose a splendid soldier and I a very good friend. He and Thorpe were out to the north of Vielle Chapelle; he had gone to see personally why our left was hung up. They were dismounted and standing on the road, when a salvo of shrapnel burst right over them. One bullet hit him in the forehead, and he died almost immediately. He never spoke or opened his eyes.

Hamilton was buried in the churchyard at La Couture, against the church wall with General Smith-Dorrien in attendance and a representative of each regiment in the division as an honour guard. The only light was provided by car headlamps, and shellfire occasionally forced the chaplain to pause in the service. Indeed, fighting was so close during the brief ceremony that enemy bullets occasionally struck the walls and nearby graves, although none of the mourners were hit. General Smith-Dorrien concluded the service with the words "Indeed a true soldier's grave. God rest his soul."

== Legacy ==
Once the fighting had moved on, Hamilton's body was exhumed and returned to England, before being reburied at St Martin's Church in Cheriton. His gravestone quotes a verse from Australian poet Adam Lindsay Gordon. A memorial tablet bearing his portrait in profile was placed inside the same church.

A large plaque was also dedicated to him anonymously in St Peter's Church at Marchington, Staffordshire (where he lived before the war) stating "I have fought the good fight. I have finished my course. I have kept faith". Years after his death his collected papers, mainly pertaining to the Second Boer War, were donated to the Liddell Hart Centre for Military Archives at King's College London, where they are still available.

== See also ==
- List of generals of the British Empire who died during the First World War

== Bibliography ==
- Davies, Frank (1997). Bloody Red Tabs: General Officer Casualties of the Great War 1914–1918. London: Pen & Sword Books. ISBN 978-0-85052-463-5.

Military offices
Preceded by Hugh Archdale	GOC North Midland Division; 1911–1914	Succeeded by Edward Montagu-Stuart-Wortley
Preceded by Sir Henry Rawlinson	GOC 3rd Division; May–October 1914	Succeeded by Colin Mackenzie
