= George Glas Sandeman Carey =

British WWI general

Major-General George Glas Sandeman Carey CB CMG
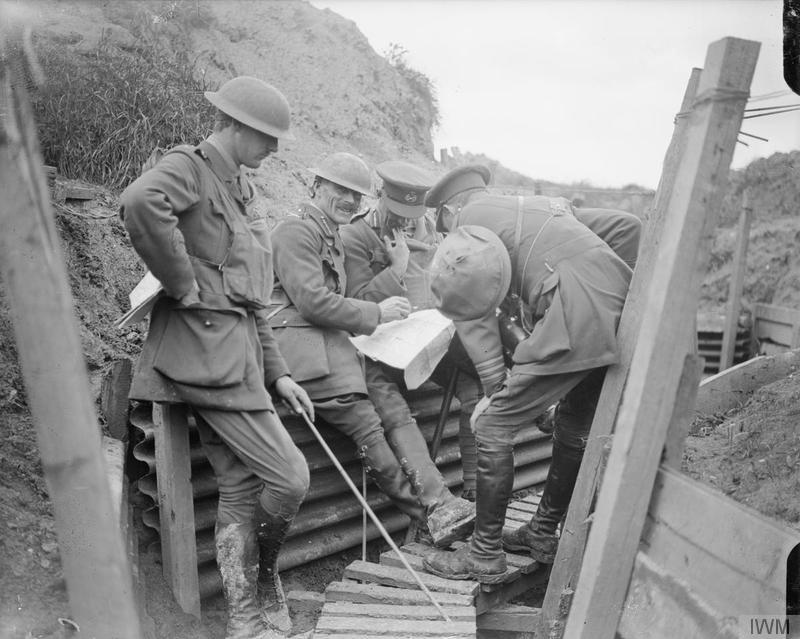
- Carey with other officers in a trench in front of Lievin, 14 May 1918
- Born: 13 February 1867
- Died: 5 March 1948 (aged 81)
- Military career
- Allegiance: United Kingdom
- Branch: British Army
- Service years: 1886–1922
- Rank: Major-General
- Commands: 20th (Light) Division; 139th Infantry Brigade
- Conflicts: Second Boer War; First World War
- Awards: Companion of the Order of the Bath; Companion of the Order of St Michael and St George; Mentioned in Despatches; Commander of the Legion of Honour (France); Commander of the Order of the Crown (Belgium)

Major-General George Glas Sandeman Carey, CB, CMG (13 February 1867 – 5 March 1948) was an officer in the British Army who, during the First World War, prevented a breakthrough of the German forces to Amiens in the Second Battle of the Somme in 1918 by assembling a scratch force of British and American troops.

He was promoted in May 1896 to captain to major in March 1901, and, by July 1913, was a lieutenant colonel.

Carey, promoted in February 1915 to brevet colonel and in June to the temporary rank of brigadier general, when he was seconded for service on the staf and became brigadier general, Royal Artillery of the 27th Division, was in June 1916 appointed a Companion of the Order of the Bath in the 1916 Birthday Honours. In May 1917 he took over command of the 46th (North Midland) Division's 139th Infantry Brigade. He took command of the 20th (Light) Division in April 1918 and was promoted to substantive colonel in July, with seniority being backdated to July 1917.

He retired from the army in January 1922 and was granted the honorary rank of major-general.
