= Reginald Hoskins =

British Army general (1871–1942)

Major-General Sir Reginald Hoskins KCB CMG DSO
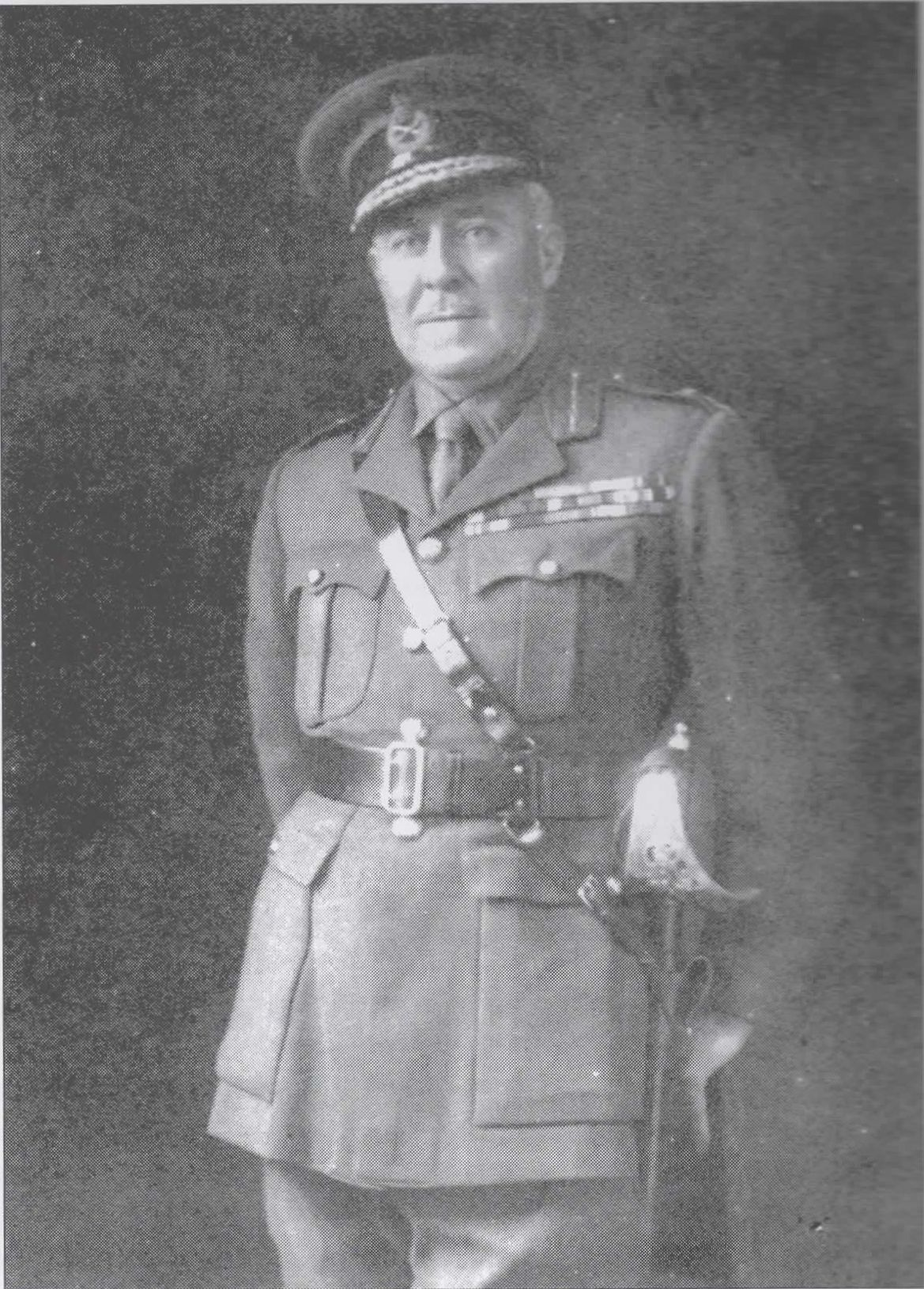
- Born: 30 May 1871; London, England
- Died: 27 February 1942 (aged 70)
- Military career
- Allegiance: United Kingdom
- Branch: British Army
- Service years: 1891–1923
- Rank: Major-General
- Commands: 8th Brigade; 1st East African Division; 3rd (Lahore) Division; 46th (North Midland) Division
- Conflicts: Dongola Expedition; Mahdist War; Second Boer War; Dervish War; First World War
- Awards: Knight Commander of the Order of the Bath; Companion of the Order of St Michael and St George; Distinguished Service Order; Mentioned in Dispatches

Major-General Sir Arthur Reginald Hoskins, KCB, CMG, DSO (30 May 1871 – 7 February 1942) was a senior British Army officer during the First World War.

== Early life ==
Hoskins was born in London on 30 May 1871, the son of Thomas Hoskins. He was educated at Westminster School before attending the Royal Military College, Sandhurst.

== Military career ==
Hoskins commissioned into the North Staffordshire Regiment on 23 May 1891, was promoted to lieutenant on 9 January 1895, and in 1896 was posted to the Egyptian Army. He first saw active service in the Dongola Expedition that same year, and also fought in the Mahdist War between 1897 and 1899, during which he was mentioned in dispatches. In late November 1899 he took part in the operations leading to the defeat of the Khalifa, and for his services in the Sudan he received a notice for consideration on future promotion. He was also made a member of the Order of the Medjidie (4th Class) in 1899.

In February 1900 he relinquished his appointment with the Egyptian Army, and joined the 2nd Battalion of his regiment which had just embarked for service in the Second Boer War in South Africa. He was promoted captain on 20 March 1900, and received a brevet promotion to major the following day, "in recognition of his services during the final pursuit and defeat of the Khalifa in the Soudan in November, 1899". He later served as an intelligence officer, and as aide-de-camp to Major General John Maxwell, military governor of Pretoria after the annexation of that city. For his service during the war, he received the Distinguished Service Order (DSO), and was noted for future staff employment. Hoskins left Cape Town for the United Kingdom in late October 1902, and was back with his regiment the following month.

He soon returned to Africa, however, when he fought in the Dervish War in 1903, serving as a staff officer on the lines of communication, and was again mentioned in despatches. Later the same year he entered the Staff College, Camberley. After passing out of Camberley in 1905 he served as a DAAG in Egypt, having been appointed in February 1906.

In April 1910 he was promoted to major. In January 1911 he was promoted to brevet lieutenant colonel. In August 1913 he returned to East Africa as inspector of the Kings African Rifles.

In September 1914 Hoskins was recalled from East Africa and was appointed assistant adjutant and quartermaster general of the 8th Division, which soon left to fight on the Western Front. On 12 November he became GSO1 (essentially chief of staff) to Major General Sir Thompson Capper, who had recently been appointed to command the 7th Division. On 25 March 1915 Hoskins was promoted to temporary brigadier general and given command of the 3rd Division's 8th Infantry Brigade, He was promoted to brevet colonel in June. He commanded the brigade until October when he was assigned as brigadier general, general staff (BGGS) of V Corps, taking over from Brigadier General Hugh Jeudwine.

In early 1916 he was transferred to the East African campaign as commander of the 1st East African Division. In the 1916 Birthday Honours Hoskins was made a Companion of the Order of St Michael and St George. He was promoted to the substantive rank of major general in January 1917.

Hoskins became commander-in-chief of British forces in East Africa on 20 January 1917, succeeding General Jan Smuts. When he took command, the British offensive had stalled, with the troops badly supplied and falling sick in large numbers. Hoskins reorganised the transport and medical services and improved the lines of communication, intending to renew the offensive when the unusually heavy rains ended. Although he achieved much, he did not have the confidence of the chief of the imperial general staff, General Sir William Robertson, who considered that Hoskins "had lost his grip of the operations" and replaced him with the South African Jacob van Deventer on 23 April 1917.

Hoskins served for the remainder of the war as the commander of the 3rd (Lahore) Division in Mesopotamia and Palestine.

For his services during the war, he was made a Knight Commander of the Order of the Bath in the 1919 Birthday Honours and was awarded the Order of the Nile (2nd Class) in November 1919. He was also made a member of the Russian Order of Saint Anna (2nd Class, with swords). His final military appointment was as the general officer commanding, 46th (North Midland) Division from June 1919 to June 1923.

From 1921 until 1936 Hoskins was honorary colonel of the North Staffordshire Regiment.

He retired from the army in 1923 and became involved in Conservative Party politics. He was principal of the Philip Stott College, Overstone in 1928 and then principal of the Bonar Law Memorial College from 1928 to 1938. Both institutions were responsible for training Conservative agents and local activists. Hoskins died at the age of 71 in 1942.

== Bibliography ==
- Anderson, Ross (2007). The Forgotten Front 1914–18: The East Africa Campaign. Tempus Publishing. ISBN 978-0-7524-4126-9.

Military offices
Preceded by Gerald Boyd	GOC 46th (North Midland) Division; 1919–1923	Succeeded by Casimir van Straubenzee
