= Casimir van Straubenzee =

Canadian-born officer in the British Army

Major-General Sir Casimir van Straubenzee KBE CB CMG
- Born: Casimir Cartwright van Straubenzee; 11 November 1867; Kingston, Ontario, Canada
- Died: 28 March 1956 (aged 88); Lansdown, Bath, Somerset
- Military career
- Allegiance: United Kingdom
- Branch: British Army
- Rank: Major-General
- Unit: Royal Artillery
- Commands: Malaya Command; 46th (North Midland) Division
- Conflicts: Fourth Anglo-Ashanti War; First World War
- Awards: Knight Commander of the Order of the British Empire; Companion of the Order of the Bath; Companion of the Order of St Michael and St George; Grand Officer of the Order of Aviz (Portugal)

Major-General Sir Casimir Cartwright van Straubenzee, KBE, CB, CMG (11 November 1867 – 28 March 1956) was a Canadian-born officer in the British Army, who served as General Officer Commanding Singapore and Malaya Command. In 1900, he played cricket for Canada.

== Early life and family ==
Born in Kingston, Ontario, van Straubenzee was the third son of Colonel Bowen van Straubenzee (1829–1898), a native of Spennithorne, Yorkshire, and his wife, Anne Macaulay Cartwright, daughter of The Hon. John Solomon Cartwright, of Kingston, Ontario. He was a nephew of General Sir Charles van Straubenzee, Commander of British Troops in China and Hong Kong and Governor of Malta.

== Military career ==
Van Straubenzee was educated at Trinity College School, Port Hope, and the Royal Military College of Canada (RMC) in Kingston, Ontario. He joined the Royal Artillery and served with the 4th Ashanti expedition (1895–96) before returning to Canada as a professor on the RMC staff from 1898 to 1903, with the local rank of major from 18 August 1898, and was promoted to the substantive rank of major on 27 February 1902.

He was promoted lieutenant colonel and, in June 1913, to colonel and served during the First World War from 1914. He was awarded the French Croix de guerre, and, after being promoted in August 1915 to the temporary rank of brigadier general, and after commanding the 19th (Western) Division's 56th Infantry Brigade from December 1915 to June 1916, was inspector general of the Royal Artillery from 1917 to 1918.

Promoted to substantive major general in June 1919, he became General Officer Commanding Singapore and then became General Officer Commanding 46th (North Midland) Division in June 1923, when he took over from Major General Sir Reginald Hoskins. In May 1927 he went on to be General Officer Commanding the Malaya Command, a command of British Commonwealth forces formed in the 1920s for the coordination of the defences of Malaya and Singapore, before retiring in February 1929.

== Cricket ==
Van Straubenzee played cricket for the Royal Engineers from 1892 to 1908, and one first-class game in 1899 for the Marylebone Cricket Club. He also played for Canada in 1900. He was the author of Recollections of Sportsmen and Sport in Days of Yore. In 1909, he married Ethel Purcell VanKoughnet (d.1949), whose father, Mathew Robert VanKoughnet (1824–1874), was a first cousin of van Straubenzee's mother – sharing a common ancestor in James Macaulay. She was a niece of Philip Michael Matthew Scott VanKoughnet and the sister of Mrs Frederick Edmund Meredith. They lived between London and Bath. He died 28 March 1956, Lansdown, Bath, Somerset.

== Legacy ==
Van Straubenzee was the sitter for two of the portraits in the National Gallery, London.

Straubenzee, the fictional maker of Colonel Sebastian Moran's air-gun in Sherlock Holmes' 'The Adventure of the Empty House', is identified as Major General Casimir Cartwright Van Straubenzee (1866–1956).

== Honours ==
Van Straubenzee was appointed a Companion of the Order of the Bath (CB) in the 1918 Birthday Honours for war service. and a Knight Commander of the Order of the British Empire (KBE) in the 1928 Birthday Honours.

He was awarded a Grand Officer of the Portuguese Military Order of Avis in 1919.

Military offices
Preceded by Sir Reginald Hoskins	GOC 46th (North Midland) Division; 1923–1923	Succeeded by Sir Percy Hambro
Preceded by Sir Theodore Fraser	GOC Malaya Command; 1927–1929	Succeeded by Harry Pritchard
