= Arthur Bartholomew (British Army officer) =

British Army officer (1878–1945)

Major-General Arthur Bartholomew CB CMG CBE DSO
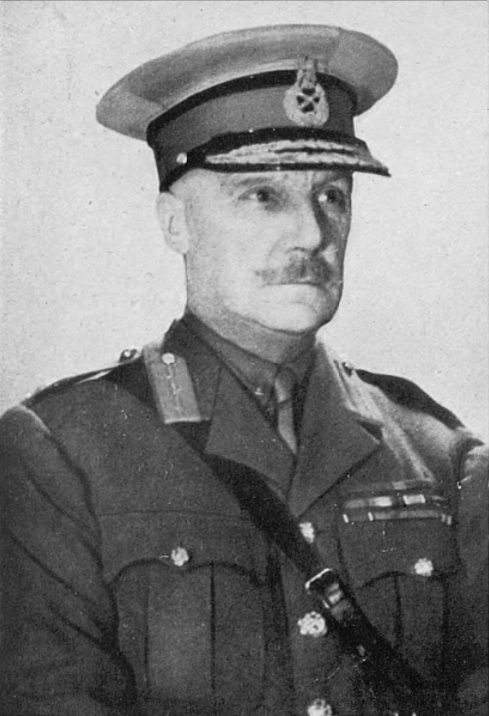
- Born: 5 May 1878
- Died: 29 January 1945 (aged 66)
- Allegiance: United Kingdom
- Branch: British Army
- Service years: 1900–1938
- Rank: Major-General
- Commands: British Troops in China (1935–1938)
- Conflicts: First World War
- Awards: Companion of the Order of the Bath; Companion of the Order of St Michael and St George; Commander of the Order of the British Empire; Distinguished Service Order

Major-General Arthur Wollaston Bartholomew, CB, CMG, CBE, DSO (5 May 1878 – 29 January 1945) was a senior British Army officer who served as Commander of British Troops in China from 1935 to 1938.

== Military career ==
Bartholomew was commissioned into the Royal Artillery as a second lieutenant on 26 May 1900 and promoted to lieutenant on 19 March 1902.

He was a keen cricketer and played for Berkshire County Cricket Club in the Minor Counties Championship.

He became an Adjutant in 1910 and then served in the First World War, initially as a Brigade Major and then as a General Staff Officer.

In 1929, he became an instructor at the Senior Officers' School and in 1931 he was made Commander Royal Artillery for 4th Division. He was promoted to major general on 8 June 1932. Then in 1933 he was appointed Inspector of the Royal Artillery.

He became Commander of British Troops in China in 1935. He retired in 1938 and became Lieutenant of the Tower of London. He was also Colonel Commandant of the Royal Artillery from 1942 until his death and Aide-de-Camp to King George V.

He lived at The Manor House in Ottery St Mary in Devon.

Military offices
Preceded by Sir Oswald Borrett	Commander of British Troops in China; 1935–1938	Succeeded by Sir Edward Grasett
