= Richard Butler (British Army officer) =

British Army general (1870–1935)

Lieutenant-General Sir Richard Butler KCB KCMG
- Butler in 1916
- Born: 28 August 1870
- Died: 22 April 1935 (aged 64); Shawbury, Shropshire
- Burial place: Hodnet, Shropshire
- Military career
- Allegiance: United Kingdom
- Branch: British Army
- Rank: Lieutenant-General
- Units: Dorset Regiment; Lancashire Fusiliers
- Commands: Western Command; 2nd Division; III Corps; 3rd Infantry Brigade; 2nd Battalion, Lancashire Fusiliers
- Conflicts: Second Boer War; First World War
- Awards: Knight Commander of the Order of the Bath; Knight Commander of the Order of St Michael and St George; Mentioned in Despatches

Lieutenant-General Sir Richard Harte Keatinge Butler, KCB, KCMG (28 August 1870 – 22 April 1935) was a British Army general during the First World War. He was chief of staff to First Army for much of 1915, then deputy chief of staff to the British Expeditionary Force from the end of 1915 to the start of 1918. For much of 1918 he commanded III Corps in the front line.

== Early life and military career ==
Butler was the son of a colonel. He was educated at Harrow School and the Royal Military College, Sandhurst, and was commissioned into the Dorset Regiment on 29 October 1890. He was promoted to lieutenant on 29 October 1892. In March 1896 he was appointed adjutant of the 2nd Dorsets. He was promoted to captain on 6 April 1897.

Butler served in the Second Boer War in South Africa, including the Battles of Spion Kop (January 1900), Vaal Krantz and Tugela Heights (February 1900); he rescued a wounded man from the River Tugela during the retreat from Spion Kop. He took part in the Relief of Ladysmith in March 1900. He then served in the Transvaal (June 1900), and in Orange Free State (June 1900), distinguishing himself in the storming of Alleman's Nek in June 1900. For his war services he was mentioned in despatches, received the Queen's South Africa Medal, and was appointed Brevet Major on 29 November 1900. By now in the Mounted Infantry, he was severely wounded at Fort Itala in September 1901. He was again seconded for service in South Africa in April 1902.

Following his return from South Africa, Butler was seconded in order to attend the Staff College, Camberley, in 1904, from where he graduated in 1906. He was a brigade major of the 5th Infantry Brigade at Aldershot from April 1906, taking over from Charles FitzClarence, to April 1910. He became a substantive major in his own regiment on 5 February 1910.

On 24 April 1911 he became a GSO2 at Aldershot Command, taking over from Walter Campbell. He was promoted brevet lieutenant colonel in May 1913.

== First World War ==
Butler was selected to command the 2nd Battalion, Lancashire Fusiliers on 28 June 1914, the same day of the assassination of Archduke Franz Ferdinand, but on the outbreak of war was instead retained at Aldershot until the end of the training season. He was sent to the front in September 1914, where he distinguished himself at the First Battle of Ypres the next month. On 13 November he succeeded Major General Herman Landon in command of the 3rd Infantry Brigade (part of the 1st Division) and which saw him promoted to temporary brigadier general.

Butler was promoted in substantive rank to brevet colonel on 18 February 1915. On 21 February he was appointed brigadier general, general staff (BGGS) to succeed the fatally wounded Brigadier General John Gough as chief of staff to General Sir Douglas Haig's First Army. He was promoted temporary major general on 23 June.

On 22 December, following Haig's promotion to be commander-in-chief of the British Expeditionary Force (BEF), Butler was appointed deputy chief of staff at GHQ in place of Brigadier General Robert Whigham; Haig had wanted him as chief of staff, but he was too junior. He was promoted to substantive major general on 3 June 1916. He was unsympathetic to and impatient with subordinates and in Beckett's view was too energetic for a staff position, and "was generally considered excessively rude and, as a result, he only added to the general isolation of GHQ from the Army". He had little interest in new technology and was a sceptic about the tank. He wanted to resign but Haig refused to release him. He was appointed a Companion of the Order of the Bath (CB) in January 1917, and a Knight Commander of the Order of St Michael and St George in January 1918.

On 27 February 1918, Butler was removed as part of the purge of senior officers (others removed included Launcelot Kiggell and John Charteris) from Haig's headquarters. A number of older corps commanders were also retired at this time, creating a vacancy for Butler to command III Corps as a temporary lieutenant-general, in place of William Pulteney. Unlike his fellow corps commander Ivor Maxse, GOC XVIII Corps, Butler favoured holding the front line in strength rather than defence in depth and III Corps bore the brunt of the German Michael Offensive in March 1918. Butler was still in command in the Amiens sector when the Germans were halted in April 1918.

Butler's corps was in the Amiens sector when the Battle of Amiens took place on 8 August, but he appears to have had a nervous collapse and was suspended from command at the request of Sir Henry Rawlinson, General officer commanding (GOC) Fourth Army. In October he returned to command for the attack on the Hindenburg Line. Rawlinson appears not to have held him in favour and redeployed him to the quieter Douai sector later that month.

== Later life and career ==
Butler was appointed a Knight Commander of the Order of the Bath in 1919. From March 1919 he was General Officer Commanding 2nd Division, first in the Army of Occupation in Germany until October 1919 then from November 1919 to February 1923 at Aldershot. He was promoted to permanent lieutenant-general on 3 January 1923. He was General Officer Commanding-in-Chief for Western Command from June 1924 to June 1928. He retired from the army on 1 January 1929.

Butler ultimately lived at Roden Lodge, Shawbury, in Shropshire, where he died at the age of 64 on 22 April 1935. He is buried in the Parish Churchyard of St Luke's Church, Hodnet, Shropshire. His wealth at death was £454 11s 1d (around £28,000 at 2016 prices).

== Family ==
On 5 June 1894 Butler married Helen Frances Battiscombe, the daughter of a major. They had a son and a daughter.

== Sources ==
- Matthew, Colin (2004). Dictionary of National Biography. Vol. 9. Oxford: Oxford University Press. ISBN 978-0198614111., essay on Butler written by Ian Beckett.

Military offices
Preceded by Sir William Pulteney	GOC III Corps; February – September 1918	Post disbanded
Preceded by Cecil Pereira	GOC 2nd Division; 1919–1923	Succeeded by Peter Strickland
Preceded by Sir John Du Cane	GOC-in-C Western Command; 1924–1928	Succeeded by Sir Cecil Romer
