= 46th (North Midland) Division =

British Army infantry unit

North Midland Division 46th (North Midland) Division
- First World War division insignia
- Active: 1908 – June 1919; 1922–1935
- Country: United Kingdom
- Branch: Territorial Army
- Type: Infantry
- Size: Division
- Peacetime HQ: Lichfield
- Engagements: Hohenzollern Redoubt; Gommecourt; Hill 70; St Quentin Canal; Selle; Sambre

Commanders
- Notable commanders: Hubert Hamilton; Hon. Edward Montagu-Stuart-Wortley; Sir William Thwaites

The 46th (North Midland) Division was an infantry division of the British Army, part of the Territorial Force, that saw service in the First World War. At the outbreak of the war in 1914, the 46th Division was commanded by Major-General Hon. Hon. E. J. Montagu-Stuart-Wortley. Originally called the North Midland Division, it was redesignated as the 46th Division in May 1915.

== Formation ==
The Territorial Force (TF) was formed on 1 April 1908 following the enactment of the Territorial and Reserve Forces Act 1907 (7 Edw.7, c.9) which combined and re-organised the old Volunteer Force, the Honourable Artillery Company and the Yeomanry. On formation, the TF contained 14 infantry divisions and 14 mounted yeomanry brigades. One of the divisions was the North Midland Division.

The North Midland Division was created by combining two existing Volunteer Infantry brigades, the Staffordshire Brigade and the North Midland Brigade. The Staffordshire Brigade was composed of battalions of the South Staffordshire Regiment and the Prince of Wales's (North Staffordshire Regiment). The North Midland Brigade was split into two, one, the Lincoln and Leicester Brigade, composed of battalions of the Lincolnshire and Leicestershire Regiments, the other, the Nottinghamshire and Derbyshire Brigade, comprising the four TF battalions of the Nottinghamshire and Derbyshire Regiment (later the Sherwood Foresters). In peacetime, the divisional headquarters was in Lichfield.

== First World War ==
=== 1914 ===
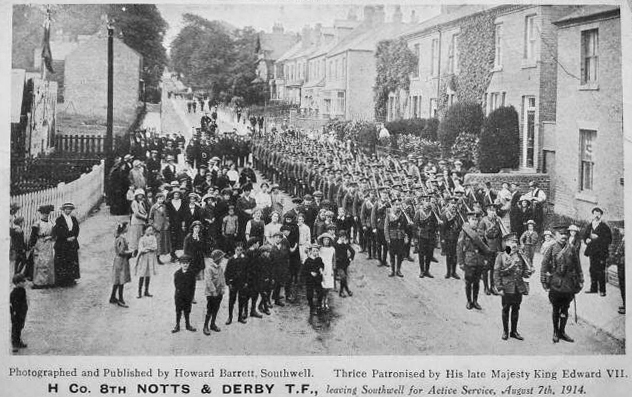
Men of H Company, 8th Battalion, Sherwood Foresters, mobilising, August 1914.

The North Midland Division, commanded by Major General Edward Montagu-Stuart-Wortley, concentrated in the Luton area by mid-August 1914, before relocating to Stansted and Bishops Stortford.

=== 1915 ===
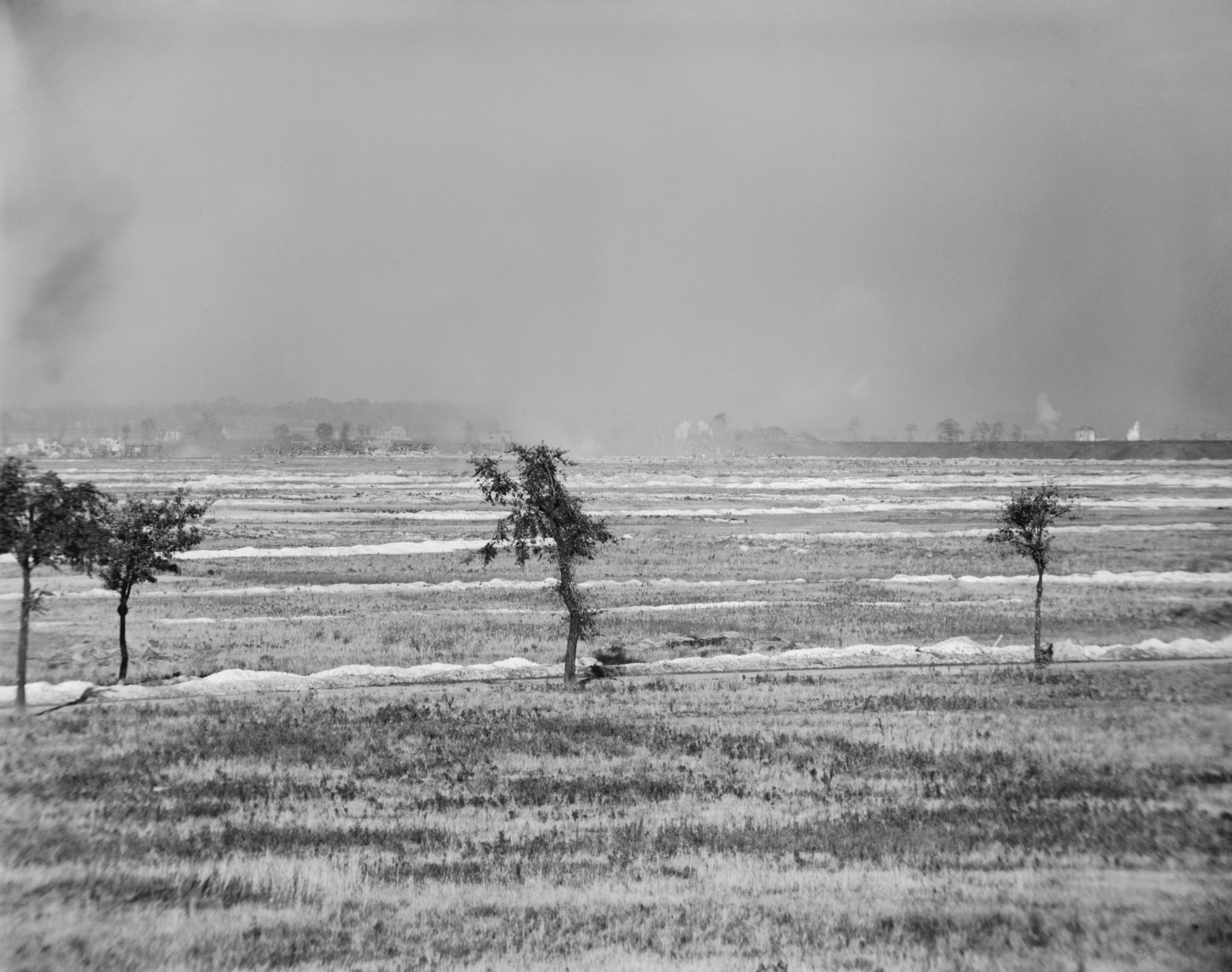
Photograph showing the 46th Division attacking the Hohenzollern Redoubt during the Battle of Loos, 13 October 1915. A cloud of smoke and gas appears in the centre and left.

King George V inspected the division on 19 February. The division's advance parties landed at Boulogne on 23 February, with the units arriving over the next eight days. Concentration was completed by 8 March, making the North Midland the first TF division to arrive complete in a theatre of war.

The division moved to the Lys valley and then to the Ploegsteert sector, where it received instruction from the 4th Division. It spent the spring on the Messines ridge front, south of the Ypres Salient. On 12 May, it was retitled as the 46th (North Midland) Division, with its three infantry brigades renumbered accordingly. The division moved to Ypres in June and took part in several engagements, including:

- The German liquid fire attack at Hooge (30-31 July)
- The attack at the Hohenzollern Redoubt (13 October)

In December 1915, the division was ordered to proceed to Egypt, leaving some units behind.

=== 1916 ===
Most units reached Egypt via Marseilles by 13 January 1916. After this very brief stint in Egypt, the division's move was countermanded, and units returned to France. The DAC, Train, and Vets rejoined, and the division remained on the Western Front for the rest of the war.

The division was later involved in the Battle of the Somme in July 1916, where, in the opening phase, as part of VII Corps, the southernmost corps of the British Third Army, the 46th Division took part in the diversionary attack at Gommecourt on the first day on the Somme, 1 July 1916, which was a catastrophic failure resulting in heavy losses of 2,445 officers and men. The division's commander, Montagu-Stuart-Wortley, was relieved from his position by General Sir Douglas Haig, commander-in-chief of the British Expeditionary Force, and Montagu-Stuart-Wortley's immediate superior, Lieutenant General Thomas Snow, believed the 46th to suffer from a "lack of offensive spirit".

=== 1917 ===
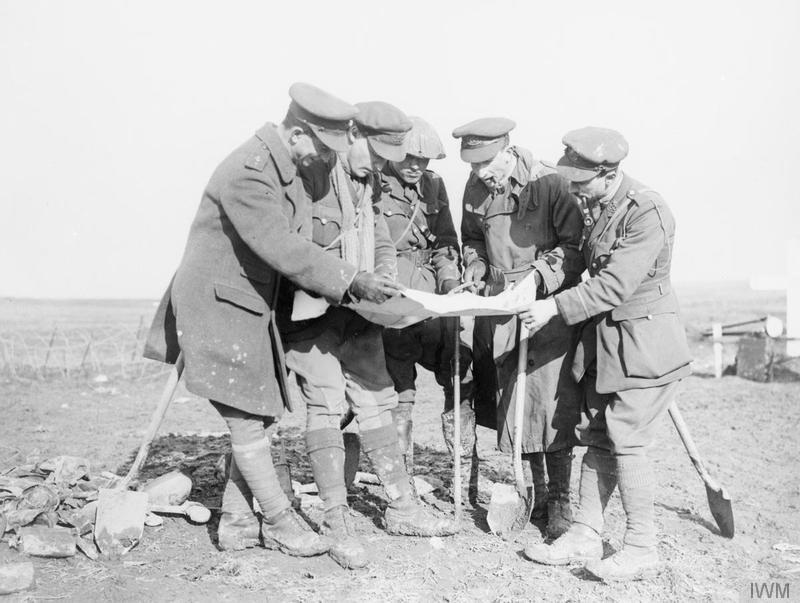
Officers of the 5th Battalion, North Staffordshire Regiment, Bucquoy, March 1917.

The division, now commanded by Major General William Thwaites after Montagu-Stuart-Wortley was sacked after the division's "failure" on the Somme, took part in the following operations throughout the year 1917:

- Operations on the Ancre (March)
- Occupied Gommecourt defences (4 March)
- Attack on Rettemoy Graben (12 March)
- German retreat to the Hindenburg Line
- Battle of Lievin (1 July)
- Battle of Hill 70 (15-25 August)

=== 1918 ===
The division took part in the following engagements in 1918:

- Battle of St Quentin Canal (including passage of the canal at Bellenglise)
- Battle of the Beaurevoir Line
- Battle of Cambrai (1918)
- Battle of the Selle
- Battle of the Sambre (1918)

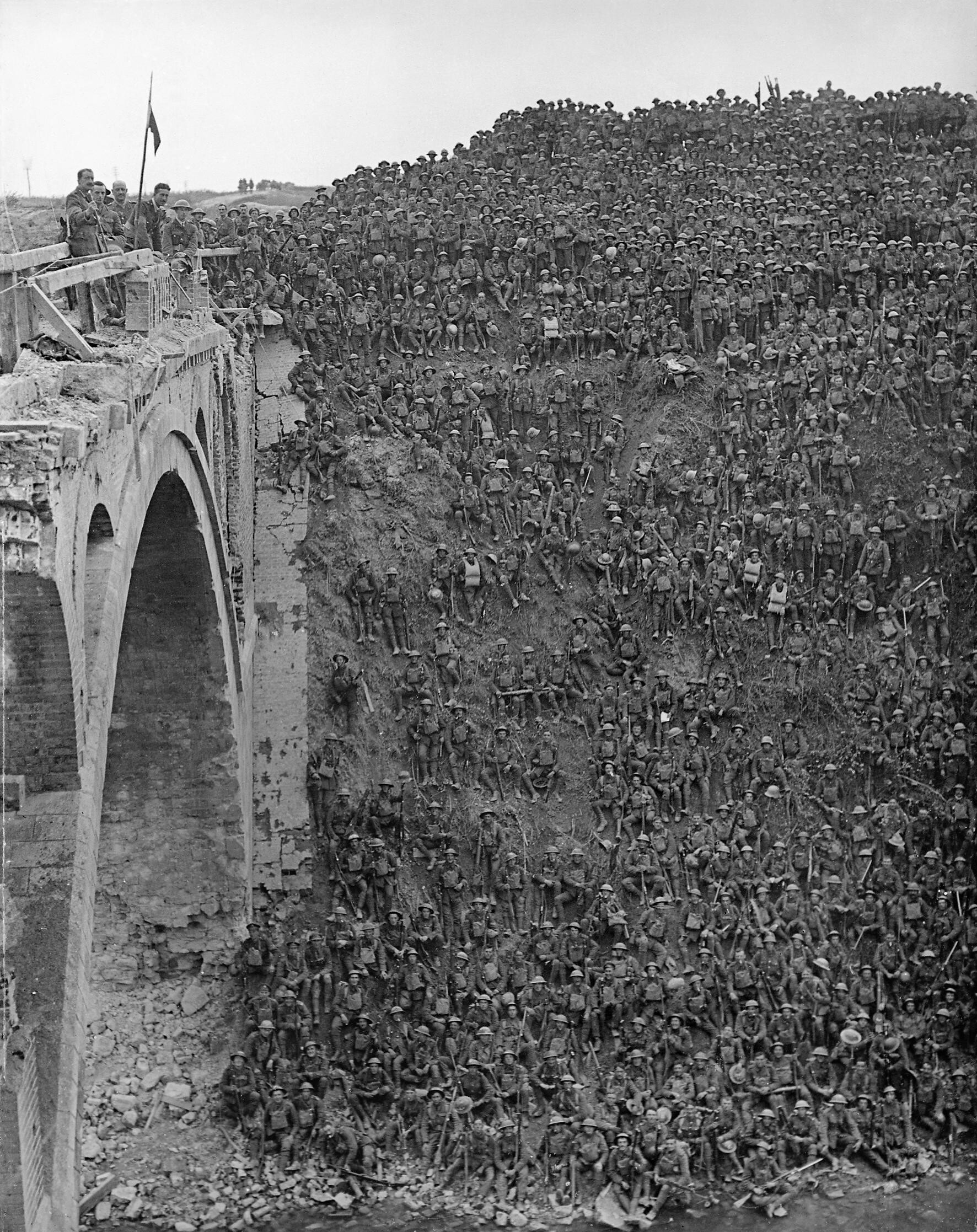
Brig-Gen John Campbell VC on Riqueval Bridge addresses men of the 137th (Staffordshire) Infantry Brigade after breaking the German's Hindenburg Line defences on 29 September 1918.

The events on the Somme dogged the division, now under Major General Gerald Boyd, afterwards with a poor reputation until 29 September 1918, during the Hundred Days Offensive, when it re-established its name at the Battle of St Quentin Canal. Utilising life-belts and collapsible boats, it crossed the formidable obstacle of the canal and used scaling ladders to surmount the steep gradient of the opposite bank and captured multiple fortified machine-gun posts.

The division's forward units were at Sains-du-Nord on 11 November 1918.

During the war, it served in the First, Second, Third and Fifth armies, and in the I, II, III, V, VII, XI, XIII, XIV, XVII and XVIII corps. Additionally, the 46th Division's total losses between February 1915, when it first went overseas, and 11 November 1918 were: officers, 275 killed, 1,104 wounded and 123 missing; other ranks, 3,475 killed, 21,285 wounded and 3,307 missing.

== Order of battle ==
During the war, the composition of the division was as follows:

137th (Staffordshire) Brigade

- 1/5th Battalion, South Staffordshire Regiment
- 1/6th Battalion, South Staffordshire Regiment
- 1/5th Battalion, Prince of Wales's (North Staffordshire Regiment) (disbanded January 1918)
- 1/6th Battalion, Prince of Wales's (North Staffordshire Regiment)
- 4th Battalion, King's Regiment (Liverpool) (from November to December 1915)
- 1/4th Battalion, Seaforth Highlanders (joined and left November 1915)
- 1/4th (City of London) Battalion, London Regiment (Royal Fusiliers) (joined and left November 1915)
- 137th Machine Gun Company, Machine Gun Corps (formed 7 March 1916, moved to 46th Battalion, Machine Gun Corps 28 February 1918)
- 137th Trench Mortar Battery (formed 2 March 1916)

138th (Lincoln and Leicester) Brigade

- 1/4th Battalion, Lincolnshire Regiment (left January 1918)
- 1/5th Battalion, Lincolnshire Regiment
- 1/4th Battalion, Leicestershire Regiment
- 1/5th Battalion, Leicestershire Regiment
- 138th Machine Gun Company, Machine Gun Corps (formed 22 February 1916, moved to 46th Battalion, Machine Gun Corps 28 February 1918)
- 138th Trench Mortar Battery (formed 2 March 1916)

139th (Sherwood Foresters) Brigade

- 1/5th Battalion, Sherwood Foresters
- 1/6th Battalion, Sherwood Foresters
- 1/7th Battalion, Sherwood Foresters (disbanded January 1918)
- 1/8th Battalion, Sherwood Foresters
- 1/4th Battalion, Black Watch (Royal Highland Regiment) (joined and left November 1915)
- 1/3rd (City of London) Battalion, London Regiment (Royal Fusiliers) (joined and left November 1915)
- 139th Machine Gun Company, Machine Gun Corps (formed 16 February 1916, moved to 46th Battalion, Machine Gun Corps 26 February 1918)
- 139th Trench Mortar Battery (formed 9 March 1916)

Mounted Troops

- B Squadron, 1/1st Yorkshire Hussars (joined at Luton, left 5 May 1916)
- North Midland Cyclist Company, Army Cyclist Corps (formed 11 November 1914, left 9 May 1916)

Artillery

- I North Midland Brigade, RFA (1st, 2nd, and 3rd Lincolnshire Batteries, and I North Midland Brigade Ammunition Column) (numbered CCXXX Bde on 13 May 1916)
- II North Midland Brigade, RFA (1st, 2nd, and 3rd Staffordshire Batteries, and II North Midland Brigade Ammunition Column) (numbered CCXXXI Bde on 13 May 1916)
- III North Midland Brigade, RFA (4th, 5th, and 6th Staffordshire Batteries, and III North Midland Brigade Ammunition Column) (numbered CCXXXII Bde on 13 May 1916; left 3 January 1917)
- IV North Midland (Howitzer) Brigade, RFA (1st and 2nd Derbyshire Batteries, and IV North Midland (H) Brigade Ammunition Column) (numbered CCXXXIII Bde on 13 May 1916; broken up 29 August 1916)
- North Midland (Staffordshire) Heavy Battery, Royal Garrison Artillery (until 18 April 1915)
- 46th Divisional Trench Mortar Brigade, RFA
  - V.46 Heavy Trench Mortar Battery (joined 20 June 1916; absorbed partly by X and Y and partly by I Corps HTM Bty on 3 February 1918)
  - X.46 Medium Trench Mortar Battery (joined 9 March 1916)
  - Y.46 Medium Trench Mortar Battery (formed 17 March 1916)
  - Z.46 Medium Trench Mortar Battery (formed 17 March 1916; absorbed by X and Y on 3 February 1918)
- North Midland Divisional Ammunition Column, RFA (formed before embarkation, later numbered 46th; absorbed brigade ammunition columns 22 May 1916)

Engineers

- North Midland Divisional Engineers (later numbered 46th)
  - 1/1st North Midland Field Company, Royal Engineers (served with 28th Division from 26 December 1914 to 6 April 1915; later numbered 465th Field Company)
  - 1/2nd North Midland Field Company, RE (later numbered 466th Field Company)
  - 57th Field Company, RE (joined from 3rd Division 7 April, left 10 July 1915)
  - 2/1st North Midland Field Company, RE (joined 10 July 1915, later numbered 468th Field Company)
  - North Midland Signal Company, RE (later numbered 46th Signal Company)

Pioneers

- 1/1st Battalion, Monmouthshire Regiment

Machine Guns

- 46th Battalion, Machine Gun Corps (formed on 28 February 1918)
  - 137th Company, MGC (moved from 137th Brigade)
  - 138th Company, MGC (moved from 138th Brigade)
  - 139th Company, MGC (moved from 139th Brigade)
  - 178th Company, MGC (joined on 28 March 1917)

Medical Services

- 1st North Midland Field Ambulance, Royal Army Medical Corps
- 2nd North Midland Field Ambulance, RAMC
- 3rd North Midland Field Ambulance, RAMC
- 17th Sanitary Section (joined 4 March 1915; left 21 March 1917)
- North Midland Divisional Ambulance Workshop, Army Service Corps (joined 4 March 1915, later numbered 46th, moved to Divisional Train 6 April 1916)
- 1st North Midland Mobile Veterinary Section, Army Veterinary Corps

Transport

- North Midland Divisional Train, ASC (later numbered 46th)
  - 451st Horse Transport Company, ASC
  - 452nd HT Company, ASC
  - 453rd HT Company, ASC
  - 454th HT Company, ASC

Labour

- 240th Divisional Employment Company, Labour Corps (formed 25 June 1917)

== Memorials ==
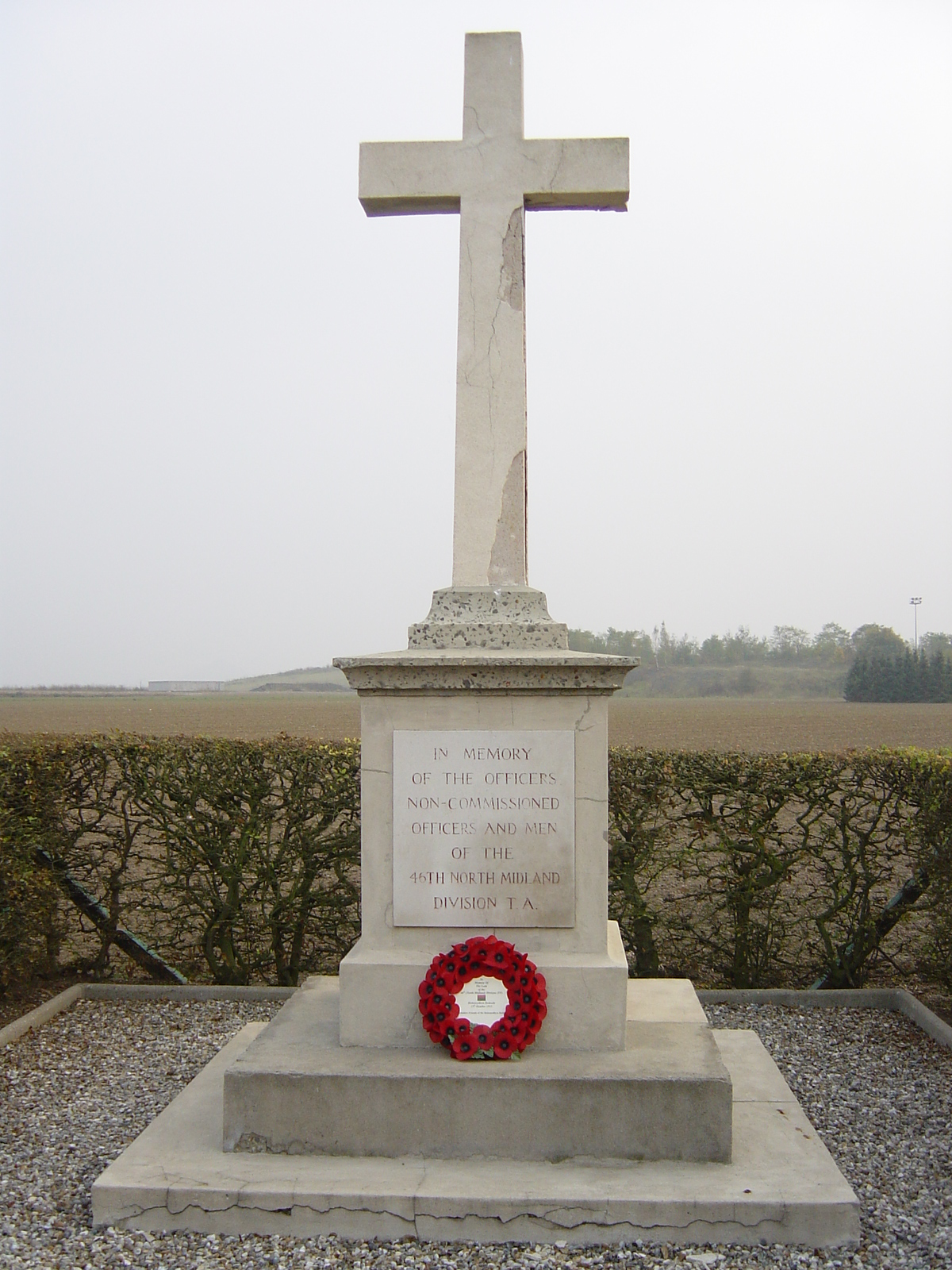
The 46th (North Midland) Division memorial on the road between Vermelles and Hulluch

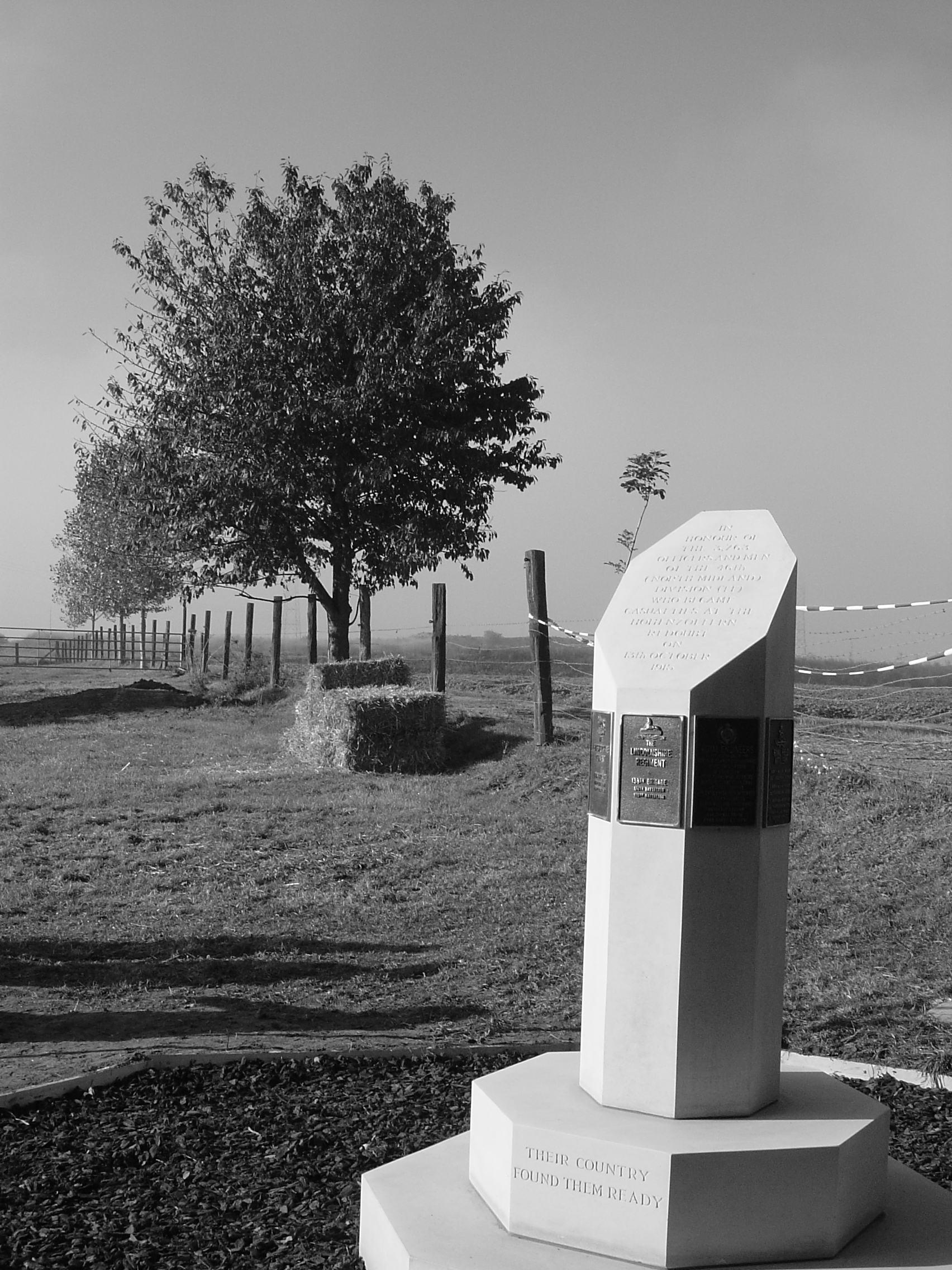
The memorial honouring the casualties of the 46th Division at the Hohenzollern Redoubt

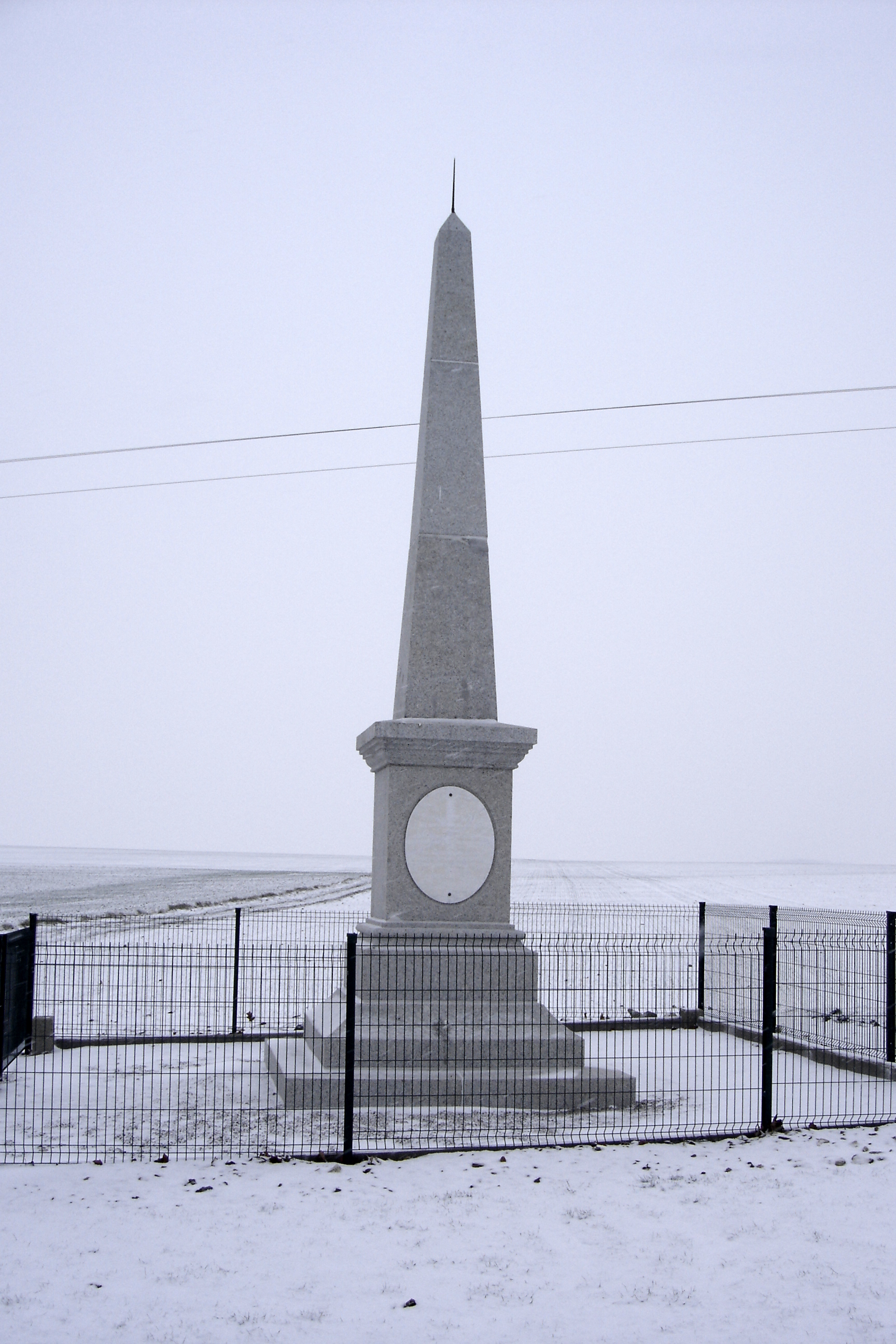
46th Division Memorial near Bellenglise (Hindenburg Line)

== Postwar ==
The Territorial Force was disbanded after the war. It was reformed as the Territorial Army in 1920 as was the 46th Division. However, the 46th Division was disbanded in 1936, the headquarters was converted into 2nd Anti-Aircraft Division and several of its infantry battalions into AA units. Most of the remainder of 46th Division's units were sent to other divisions, mainly the 49th (West Riding).

== Commanders ==
The following officers commanded the division at various times:

| Appointed | General officer commanding |
|---|---|
| April 1908 | Brigadier-General Hugh J. Archdale |
| January 1911 | Major-General Hubert I. W. Hamilton |
| 1 June 1914 | Major-General Hon. Edward Montagu-Stuart-Wortley |
| 6 July 1916 | Brigadier-General H. M. Campbell (acting) |
| 8 July 1916 | Major-General William Thwaites |
| 2 September 1918 | Brigadier-General F. G. M. Rowley (acting) |
| 5 September 1918 | Major-General Gerald F. Boyd |
| June 1919 | Major-General Sir A. Reginald Hoskins |
| June 1923 | Major-General Casimir C. van Straubenzee |
| May 1927 | Major-General Sir Percy O. Hambro |
| May 1931 | Major-General Oswald C. Borrett |
| December 1932 | Major-General Maurice G. Taylor |
| April 1934 | Major-General Sir Hereward Wake |

== Victoria Cross recipients ==
- Lance Corporal William Coltman, 1/6th Battalion, North Staffordshire Regiment
- Lieutenant John Barrett, 1/5th Battalion, Leicestershire Regiment
- Captain John Green Royal Army Medical Corps, attached 1/5th Battalion, Sherwood Foresters
- Sergeant William Johnson, 1/5th Battalion, Sherwood Foresters
- Lieutenant Colonel Bernard Vann, 1/6th Battalion, Sherwood Foresters
- Captain Geoffrey Vickers, 1/7th (Robin Hood) Battalion, Sherwood Foresters

== See also ==
- List of British divisions in World War I

== Bibliography ==
- Becke, Archibald F. (1936). Order of Battle of Divisions Part 2A. The Territorial Force Mounted Divisions and the 1st-Line Territorial Force Divisions (42–56). London: HMSO. OCLC 4405016.
- Joslen, H. F. (2003) [1960]. Orders of Battle: Second World War, 1939–1945. Uckfield, East Sussex: Naval and Military Press. ISBN 978-1-84342-474-1.
- Alan MacDonald, A Lack of Offensive Spirit? The 46th (North Midland) Division at Gommecourt, 1st July 1916, West Wickham: Iona Books, 2008, ISBN 978-0-9558119-0-6.
- Priestley, R.E. (1919). Breaking the Hindenburg Line: the story of the 46th (North Midland) Division. London: T. Fisher Unwin./Uckfield: Naval & Military Press, 2002, ISBN 978-1-843422-66-2.
- Westlake, Ray (1992). British Territorial Units 1914–18. Men-at-Arms Series. Vol. 245. Osprey. ISBN 978-1-85532-168-7.
