= Robert Stott (British Army officer) =

British soldier

Brigadier Robert Edwin Hugh Stott, CBE DSO (29 November 1898 – 25 December 1984) was a career soldier in the British Army who commanded the 139th Infantry Brigade during the Tunisian campaign and the invasion of Italy, two major campaigns of the Second World War. He subsequently commanded the Infantry Reinforcement Training Depot in Italy.

== Early life and First World War ==
Robert Edwin Hugh Stott was born in Berkhamsted, Hertfordshire on 29 November 1898, then son of Edwin Stott, a sea captain, and Azila Marianne (née Smith). He was educated at Berkhamsted School. On 8 December 1916, two years into the First World War, Edwin Stott's ship, a tanker, the S.S. Conch, was sunk by the German submarine UB-23 in the English Channel, with the loss of 24 lives including her master. Robert Stott entered the Royal Military College, Sandhurst, from where he was commissioned as a second lieutenant in the Sherwood Foresters of the British Army in April 1918. He fought in France in the Battle of St Quentin Canal, which started the breaking of the Hindenburg Line, and so the end of the war. After the end of the war, he was posted to Egypt, Turkey, and India, and then to regimental headquarters in Chesterfield, where he was at the outbreak of the Second World War.

== Second World War ==
At the outbreak of the Second World War, Stott was deployed in France in September 1939 with the rank of Major, where he fought during the Battle of France until he was evacuated at Dunkirk. He then returned to England, until he went with his regiment to Tunisia in December 1942, where he fought in the Battle of Sedjenane (1943), during which he was given command of the 139th Infantry Brigade and promoted to the rank of Brigadier. He commanded the 139th Infantry Brigade during the Salerno Landings (1943).

Stott was appointed to command the Infantry Reinforcement Training Depot in Italy, where he remained until the end of the war. He was awarded a CBE for changing the depot from being "rather unsatisfactory" into being "a really efficient establishment."

== Later life ==
After the German surrender, Stott joined the Allied Control Commission in Germany, first acting as Commandant of the Search Bureau, British Zone and later as Kreis Regional Officer in Neumünster, Scheswig-Holstein, part of the British Zone. In 1947 he returned to England, married, and after a period spent running a public house in Sussex, moved to London, where he worked as Appeals Director for the SSAFA the Soldiers, Sailors, Airmen and Families Association, organising an annual tattoo at the White City Stadium. He retired in 1972.
