= Hugh Archdale =

British Army officer

Brigadier-General Hugh Archdale CB CMG
- Born: 15 January 1854; London
- Died: 31 August 1921 (aged 67); London
- Military career
- Allegiance: United Kingdom
- Branch: British Army
- Rank: Brigadier-General
- Commands: North Midland Division
- Conflicts: Second Boer War
- Awards: Companion of the Order of the Bath; Companion of the Order of St Michael and St George

Brigadier-General Hugh James Archdale CB, CMG (15 January 1854 – 31 August 1921) was a British Army officer.

== Military career ==
Educated at Cheltenham College, Archdale was commissioned into the Royal Welch Fusiliers in 1875. After serving in Sudan, Burma and Crete, Archdale, promoted on 13 July 1892 to major, saw action in the Second Boer War for which he was appointed a Companion of the Order of the Bath (CB).

He became commandant of the Imperial Yeomanry Discharge Depot at Aldershot in 1903 and, after commanding a battalion of the Lincolnshire Regiment (later the Royal Lincolnshire Regiment), he was placed on half-pay on 6 October 1904. In January 1907 he was promoted to substantive colonel and temporary brigadier general while employed as commander of a grouped regimental district.

He was the first general officer commanding (GOC) of the North Midland Division, Territorial Force (TF), on 1 April 1908 before retiring from the army in January 1911.

He was recalled to service during the First World War, which began in the summer of 1914, and was placed in command of a brigade on 20 September 1914 and was granted the temporary rank of brigadier general while employed in this position.

Military offices
New title	GOC North Midland Division; 1908–1911	Succeeded by Hubert Hamilton
