= Theodore Fraser =

Major-General Sir Theodore Fraser KCB CSI CMG
- Born: 15 June 1865; Inverness, Scotland
- Died: 22 May 1953 (aged 87); Putney, London
- Military career
- Allegiance: United Kingdom
- Branch: British Army
- Rank: Major-General
- Unit: Royal Engineers
- Awards: Knight Commander of the Order of the Bath; Companion of the Order of the Star of India; Companion of the Order of St Michael and St George

Major-General Sir Theodore Fraser KCB CSI CMG (15 June 1865 – 22 May 1953) was a British Army officer in the Royal Engineers, serving for most of his career with the Indian Army.

== Education and early life ==
Fraser was born on 15 June 1865 in Inverness, Scotland to parents Rev Prof Donald Fraser D.D. (1826–1892) and Theresa Eliza Isabella Gordon, the fourth daughter of Major-General Alexander Gordon of the Royal Engineers. His Scots-born father had spent much time in Canada but returned to Scotland after he married. In 1870 the family moved to Marylebone in London and his father became a prominent figure in the Presbyterian Church of England, serving as Moderator of the Synod in 1880.

From University College School Theodore went to Clare College, Cambridge, and the Royal Military Academy, Woolwich, obtaining his commission direct into the Royal Engineers in February 1886.

== Military career ==
Indian service soon brought him experience of frontier warfare. He was in the Chin-Lushai expedition of 1889–90 and the Hazara expedition in 1891. He was promoted to captain on 13 August 1896, and served as an adjutant of the 2nd Division during the Tirah campaign of 1897–98. In February 1900 he left Southampton in the SS Assaye bound for active service in South Africa during the Second Boer War. His experience was put to use as a Special Service Officer stationed in Cape Colony, the Orange Free State, and the Frederickstad in Western Transvaal until December that year.

In 1901 he was sent to the Staff College, Camberley. Promoted to major in September 1904, he was appointed a deputy assistant adjutant general of the Bombay Brigade in February 1905. His role was changed to deputy assistant quartermaster general at British Army headquarters in Simla in November 1907. He stayed on at the headquarters for two years. In February 1909 he assumed the role of a professor and General Staff Officer Grade 2, instructing young officers at the newly created Staff College, Quetta for the next three years, and was promoted to lieutenant colonel in December 1912. Shortly after promotion he was sent to Britannia Royal Naval College in England.

Though he was eager for active service during World War I, he was given an administrative role of embarkation commandant. It was not until March 1915, seven months after the British entry into World War I, that he was appointed assistant adjutant and quartermaster general of the Lahore Division, then serving on the Western Front. In this capacity, and later as assistant quartermaster general he was with the division at "Second Ypres" and the battles of Aubers Ridge and Festubert.

In May 1916 Fraser was appointed the administrative role of general staff officer, grade 1 of the newly formed 15th Indian Division, stationed on the Euphrates Front until October of that same year where he was again transferred to the III Corps as a brigadier general, general staff. He was made a Companion of the Order of the Bath in December 1916, which was backdated to June. He served with the corps through the Battle of Kut, and the maneuver leading to the occupation of Baghdad, and then the operations on the Adhaim in April 1917. He had received a promotion to brevet colonel in March, and reached the substantive rank of colonel in December, by which time the operations in the Jabal Hamrin area had been concluded. From February to April 1918, he acted as chief of the general staff to Lieutenant General Sir William Marshall, the commander-in-chief of the British and Indian forces in Mesopotamia.

He assumed the command of the 15th Division in September 1918, for which he was raised to temporary major general, the 18th Division in the following March, and promoting to major general in June 1919. While assigned to the 18th Division, Fraser was tasked to lead "South Kurdistan Force" to conduct operations against Shaikh Mahmud Barzanji, who was leading a localized rebellion. Barzenji was wounded and ultimately captured by Fraser's forces. He later was engaged in other Kurdistan operations of 1919–20, relinquishing command in October, 1921, From March to November, 1922, he commanded the forces in Iraq, but was not again employed until May 1924, when he was appointed General Officer Commanding (GOC) Malaya Command. He performed his tour of duty in Singapore for the next three years until his retirement on 9 June 1927, with Major-General C.C. Van Straubenzee, KBE, CB, CMG (1867–1956) replacing him as the next GOC Malaya on 16 June 1927.

Major-General Sir Theodore Fraser's last known home address was at The Rookery, Roehampton Lane, London, in 1939.

Sir Theodore Fraser died in a nursing home on 22 May 1953 in Putney, London, at the age of 87. His funeral was carried at out the Putney Vale Crematorium at 2.30 p.m. on Tuesday, 26 May 1953.

== Family ==
He married Constance Ruth Stevenson, daughter of Nathaniel Stevenson in June 1903 at Marylebone Parish Church.

Military offices
Preceded by Sir Neill Malcolm	GOC Malaya Command; 1924–1927	Succeeded by Sir Casimir van Straubenzee
