= Oswald Borrett =

British Army general (1878–1950)

Lieutenant-General Sir Oswald Borrett KCB CMG CBE DSO*
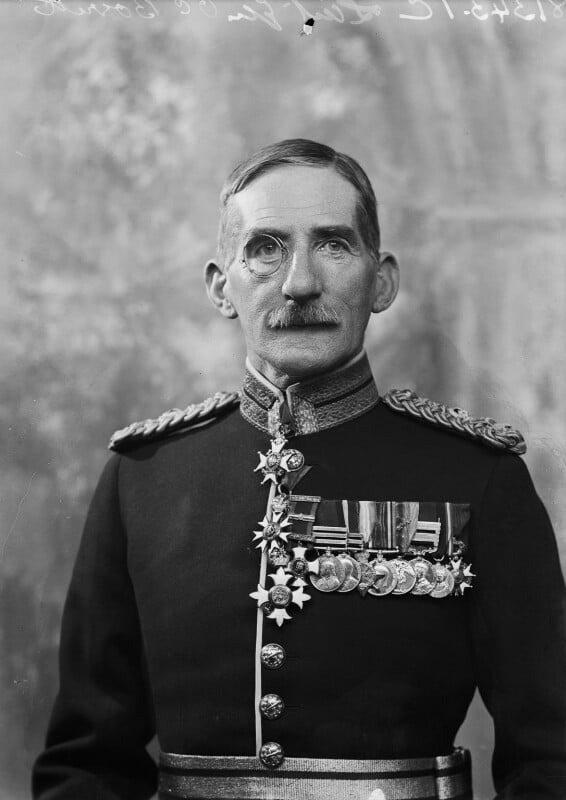
- Borrett in 1936
- Born: 4 March 1878; Gibraltar
- Died: 28 July 1950 (aged 72); Guildford, Surrey
- Military career
- Allegiance: United Kingdom
- Branch: British Army
- Service years: 1898–1938; 1940–1941
- Rank: Lieutenant-General
- Commands: British Troops in China; 46th (North Midland) Division; British Troops in the Shanghai Area; 7th Indian Infantry Brigade
- Conflicts: Second Boer War; First World War; North-West Frontier
- Awards: Knight Commander of the Order of the Bath; Companion of the Order of St Michael and St George; Commander of the Order of the British Empire; Distinguished Service Order & Bar

Lieutenant-General Sir Oswald Cuthbert Borrett, KCB, CMG, CBE, DSO & Bar (4 March 1878 – 28 July 1950) was a British Army officer who served as Commander of British Troops in China and Lieutenant of the Tower of London.

== Early life and family ==
Borrett was born in Gibraltar, the fifth son of Major General Herbert Cuthbert Borrett. He was educated at Wellington College and Royal Military College Sandhurst.

In 1903, he married Blanche Mary Murray, daughter of Colonel Alexander Murray. His brother, Harold Giles Borrett, married actress Marie Studholme in 1908.

== Military career ==
Borrett was commissioned into the King's Own (Royal Lancaster Regiment) as a second lieutenant on 7 May 1898.

He served in the Second Boer War as a special service officer, was promoted to lieutenant on 5 February 1900, and to captain from supernumery captain on 12 August 1902.

After the end of the war in South Africa, he returned to a regular posting with his regiment in August 1902. He then became Adjutant in the Indian Volunteers in 1911.

He also served in the First World War and then went out to the North-West Frontier in India in September 1920. He became Colonel Commandant of the 7th Indian Infantry Brigade in June 1923. He was appointed colonel of the King's Own Royal Regiment on 19 November 1926, taking over from General Sir Archibald Hunter. He was commander of British Troops in the Shanghai Area of China in August 1927, General Officer Command 46th (North Midland) Division in May 1931 and Commander of British Troops in China in December 1932 before retiring in 1938.

During the Second World War he was appointed Inspector of Prisoners.

He also became Lieutenant of the Tower of London in April 1936 (until 1939) and Aide-de-camp to the King as well as Colonel of the King's Own Royal Regiment (Lancaster) (1926–1945).

He retired to Lowood House in Rockshaw Road in Reigate.

Borrett Road in Mid-Levels in Hong Kong is named after him.

Military offices
| Preceded by Sir Percy Hambro | GOC 46th (North Midland) Division; 1931–1932 | Succeeded by Maurice Taylor |
| Preceded by James Sandilands | Commander of British Troops in China; 1932–1935 | Succeeded by Arthur Bartholomew |
Honorary titles
| Preceded by Archibald Hunter | Colonel of the King's Own Royal Regiment (Lancaster); 1926–1945 | Succeeded by Russell Mortimer Luckock |
