= William Pulteney (British Army officer) =

British general (1861–1941)

Lieutenant-General Sir William Pulteney GCVO KCB KCMG DSO
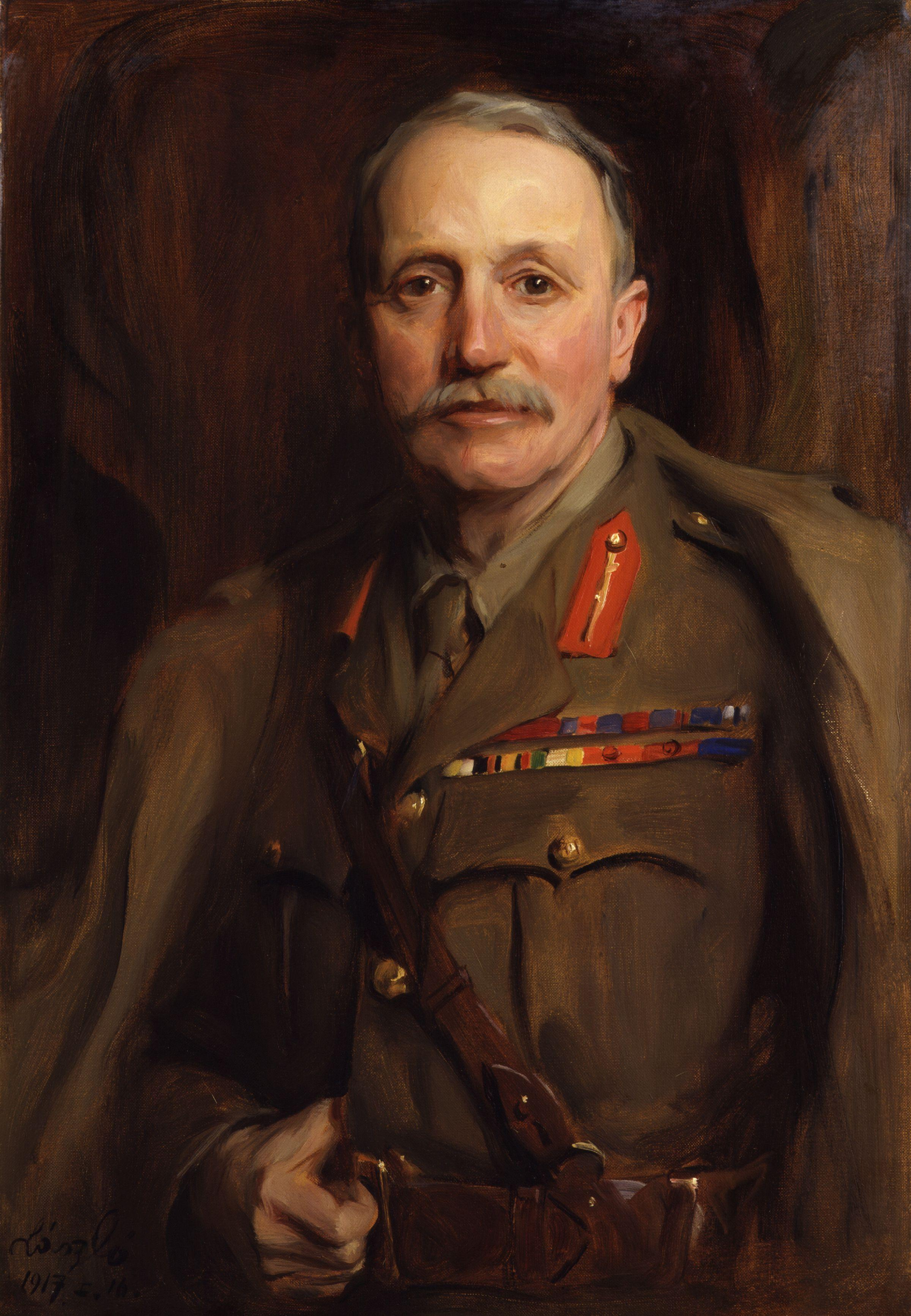
- Portrait by Philip de László, 1917
- Born: 18 May 1861; Ashley, Northamptonshire, England
- Died: 14 May 1941 (aged 79); Stansted Mountfitchet, Essex, England
- Spouse: Jessie Arnott
- Military career
- Allegiance: United Kingdom/British Empire
- Branch: British Army
- Service years: 1878–1920
- Rank: Lieutenant-General
- Units: Oxford Militia; Scots Guards
- Commands: XXIII Corps; III Corps; 6th Division; 16th Infantry Brigade; 1st Battalion, Scots Guards
- Conflicts: Anglo-Egyptian War; Second Boer War; First World War
- Awards: Knight Grand Cross of the Royal Victorian Order; Knight Commander of the Order of the Bath; Knight Commander of the Order of St Michael and St George; Distinguished Service Order

Lieutenant-General Sir William Pulteney Pulteney, GCVO, KCB, KCMG, DSO (18 May 1861 – 14 May 1941) was a British general during the First World War.

== Early military career ==
Educated at Eton College, Pulteney was commissioned into the Oxfordshire Militia in October 1878. He transferred to the Scots Guards where he was commissioned a second lieutenant on 23 April 1881.

== Anglo-Egyptian War ==
The following year he served in the Anglo-Egyptian War, where he was present at the Battle of Tell El Kebir (September 1882). On 4 May 1892 he was promoted to captain, and in 1895 he served with the Bunyoro expedition and the Nandi expedition, for which he was mentioned in despatches and was appointed a Companion of the Distinguished Service Order (DSO). Promotion to major followed on 1 May 1897.

== Second Boer War ==
The Second Boer War broke out in October 1899, and Pulteney served with the 1st Battalion of his regiment in South Africa from late 1899, attached to the Guards Brigade, with the brevet appointment as lieutenant colonel from 11 November 1899. He was present at the battles of Belmont, Enslin and Modder River (November 1899), and the battle of Magersfontein (December 1899). The following year he was appointed second in command of his regiment in April, took part in the march to Bloemfontein and Pretoria, and the battles of Diamond Hill (June 1900), Belfast (August 1900) and the advance to Komatipoort in September. For his service in the war, he received the brevet promotion as colonel on 29 November 1900. He stayed with his regiment in South Africa until the war ended in May 1902, and left for the United Kingdom on the SS Briton two months later.

== Between wars ==
After the war, and after being placed on half-pay at his own request in January 1908, he was promoted in February to temporary brigadier general and took command of the 16th Infantry Brigade in Ireland from 1908 and the 6th Division, the brigade's parent formation, in Ireland in 1910. He was promoted again, this time to major general, in January 1909. In July 1910 he took command of the 6th Division, taking over from Major General Charles Metcalfe, a position he held until the outbreak of the First World War some four years later.

== First World War ==
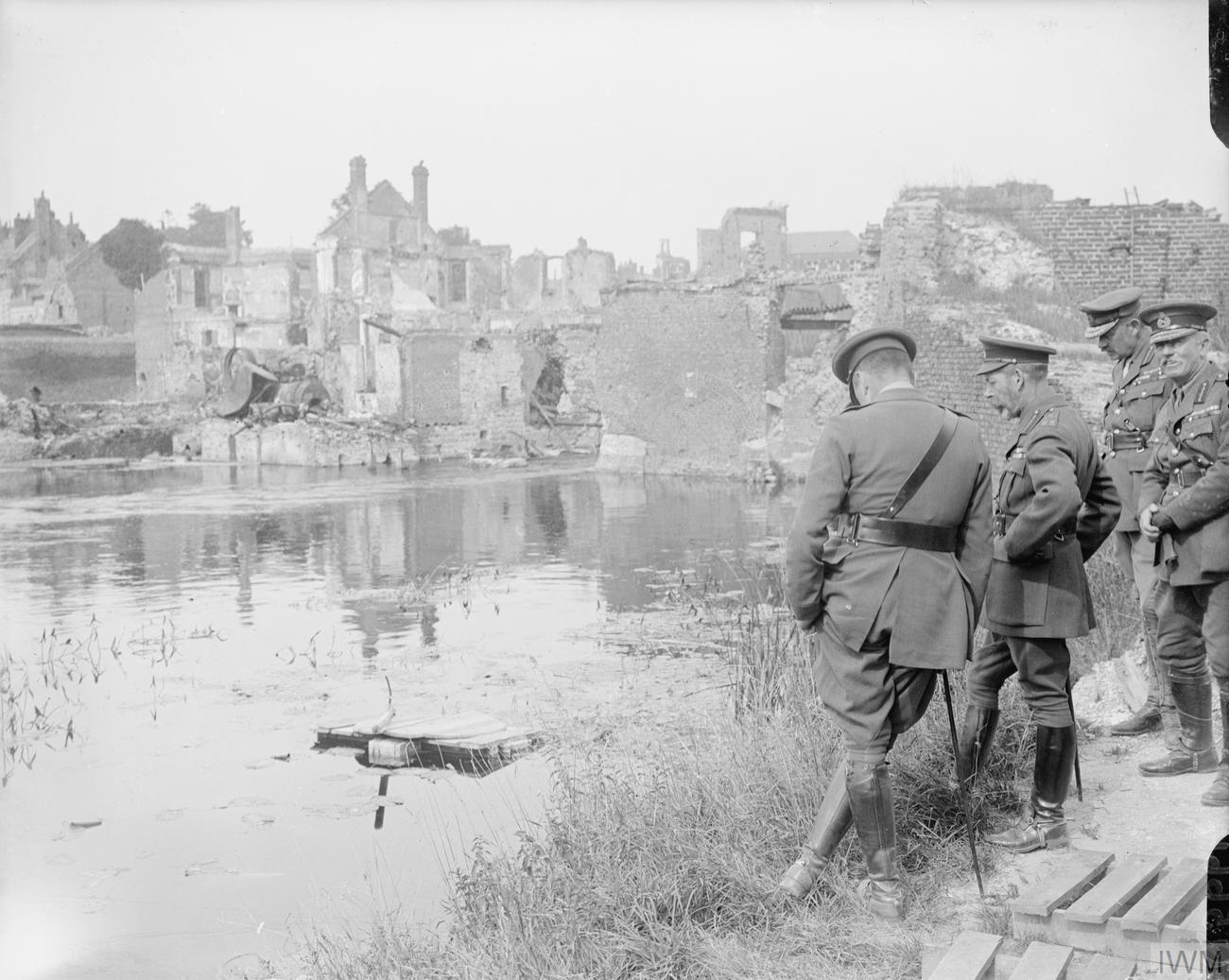
King George V visiting the ruins of Peronne, 13 July 1917. With him are Lieutenant-General William Pulteney, GOC III Corps, and Brigadier-General Percy Hambro, the Quartermaster General of III Corps.

Pulteney had an extensive operational career during the First World War, receiving a promotion to temporary lieutenant general on 5 August, the day after the British entry into World War I, and being made general officer commanding of the III Corps, serving on the Western Front continuously from 31 August 1914 through to 19 February 1918.

Pulteney, who in May 1915 became a substantive lieutenant general, commanded XXIII Corps in the United Kingdom from 20 February 1918 to 15 April 1919.

== Later life ==
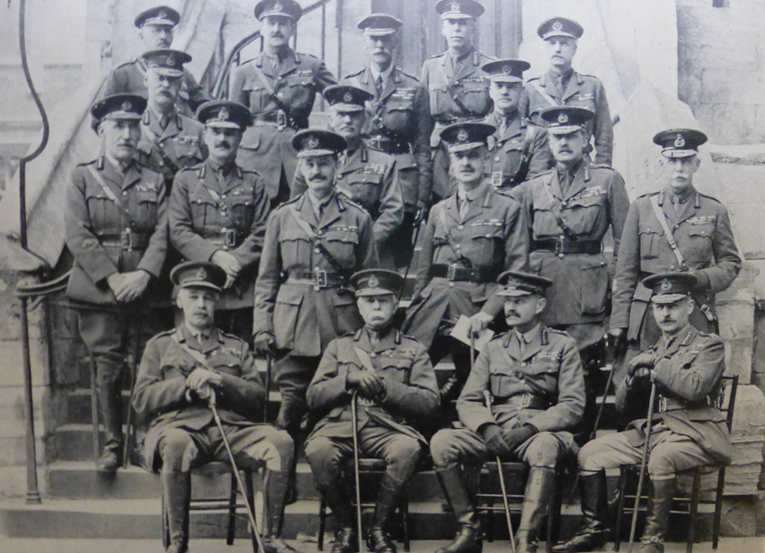
Eighteen Old Etonian generals revisit Eton, May 1919. Lieutenant General Pulteney is stood in the middle row, fifth from the left, behind Major General Lambton.

After the First World War he served with the British military mission to Japan, until his retirement from the army in January 1920.

He held the office of 'Black Rod' in the Parliament of the United Kingdom from 1920 to 1941.

== Honours ==
He was created a Knight Commander of the Order of the Bath in 1915; a Knight Commander of the Order of St Michael and St George in 1917, and a Knight Commander of the Royal Victorian Order in 1918.

== Personal life ==
Pulteney was married in 1917 to Jessie, daughter of Sir John Arnott, Baronet.

== Bibliography ==
- Leask, Anthony (2015). Putty: From Tel-el-Kebir to Cambrai: The Life and Letters of Lieutenant General Sir William Pulteney 1861-1941. Helion and Company. ISBN 978-1910294956.

Military offices
Preceded by Charles Metcalfe	GOC 6th Division; 1910–1914	Succeeded by John Keir
Preceded by New post	GOC III Corps; 1914–1918	Succeeded by Richard Butler
Government offices
Preceded by Sir Henry Stephenson	Black Rod; 1920–1941	Succeeded by Sir William Mitchell
