= III Corps (United Kingdom) =

Corps of the British Army in the First and Second World Wars

- Formation sign of III Corps during the Second World War.
- Active: First World War and Second World War
- Country: United Kingdom
- Branch: British Army
- Type: Field corps
- Engagements: Battle of the Marne; First Battle of the Aisne; Battle of La Bassee; Battle of Messines (1914); Battle of Armentieres; Battle of the Somme 1916; German retreat to the Hindenburg Line 1917; Battle of Cambrai 1917; First Battles of the Somme 1918; Battle of Amiens; Second Battles of the Somme 1918; Battles of the Hindenburg Line; The Final Advance in Artois; Retreat to Dunkirk 1940; Greece 1944

Commanders
- Notable commanders: Duke of Connaught; Sir William Pulteney; Richard Butler; Sir Ronald Adam; Ronald Scobie

Insignia
- Corps formation sign during the First World War.

III Corps was an army corps of the British Army formed in both the First World War and the Second World War.

== Prior to the First World War ==
In 1876, a mobilisation scheme for eight army corps was published, with '3rd Corps' headquartered at Croydon and composed of the guards regiments. In 1880 its order of battle was:

- 1st Division (Croydon)
  - 1st Brigade (London)
    - 1st Bn. Grenadier Guards (Wellington Barracks), 2nd Bn. Coldstream Guards (The Tower), 2nd Bn. Scots Guards (Chelsea)
  - 2nd Brigade (Croydon)
    - 3rd Bn. Grenadier Guards (Chelsea), 1st Bn. Coldstream Guards (Shorncliffe), 1st Bn. Scots Guards (Wellington Barracks)
  - Divisional Troops
    - 1st Bn. 60th Foot (Winchester), Staffordshire Yeomanry (Lichfield), 9th Company Royal Engineers (RE) (Chatham)
  - Artillery
    - C/5th Brigade Royal Artillery(RA) (Ipswich), B/5th Brigade RA (Chatham), B/6th Brigade RA (Woolwich)
- 2nd Division (Red Hill)
  - 1st Brigade (Red Hill)
    - Kilkenny Militia (Kilkenny), King's County Militia (Parsonstown), Limerick County Militia (Limerick)
  - 2nd Brigade (Red Hill)
    - 1st Royal Surrey Militia (Richmond upon Thames), 2nd Royal Surrey Militia (Guildford), 3rd Royal Surrey Militia (Kingston upon Thames)
  - Divisional Troops
    - Royal Tyrone Fusiliers Militia (Omagh), Warwickshire Yeomanry (Warwick)
  - Artillery
    - L/3rd Brigade RA (Hilsea), L/4th Brigade RA (Hilsea), C/6th Brigade RA (Woolwich)
- 3rd Division (Tunbridge Wells)
  - 1st Brigade (Tunbridge Wells)
    - West Kent Light Infantry Militia (Maidstone), 4th South Middlesex Militia (Hounslow), Royal London Militia (London)
  - 2nd Brigade (Maidstone)
    - 1st Royal East Middlesex Militia (Hounslow), 2nd Royal West Middlesex Militia (Barnet), 3rd Royal Westminster Middlesex Militia (Turnham Green)
  - Divisional Troops
    - Royal Sussex Light Infantry Militia (Chichester), Leicestershire Yeomanry (Leicester)
  - Artillery
    - B/1st Brigade RA (Shorncliffe), C/1st Brigade RA (Shorncliffe)
- Cavalry Brigade (Ashford)
  - 1st Life Guards (London), 2nd Life Guards (Windsor), Royal Horse Guards (London), East Kent Yeomanry (Canterbury), K Battery B Brigade RHA (Canterbury)
- Corps Artillery (Croydon)
  - K Battery A Brigade Royal Horse Artillery (RHA) (Exeter), F Battery B Brigade RHA (Exeter)

This scheme had been dropped by 1881. The Stanhope Memorandum of 1891 (drawn up by Edward Stanhope when Secretary of State for War) laid down the policy that after providing for garrisons and India, the army should be able to mobilise three army corps for home defence, two of regular troops and one partly of militia, each of three divisions. The 1901 army estimates introduced by St John Brodrick allowed for six army corps based on the six regional commands (Aldershot, Southern, Irish, Eastern, Northern and Scottish). From 1 October 1901, the Duke of Connaught held the dual commands of CinC Ireland and GOCinC III Corps. Under Army Order No 38 of 1907, the title III Corps disappeared, but the Irish Command was constituted as a corps comprising 3rd Cavalry Brigade, 5th Infantry Division and 6th Infantry Division.

== First World War ==
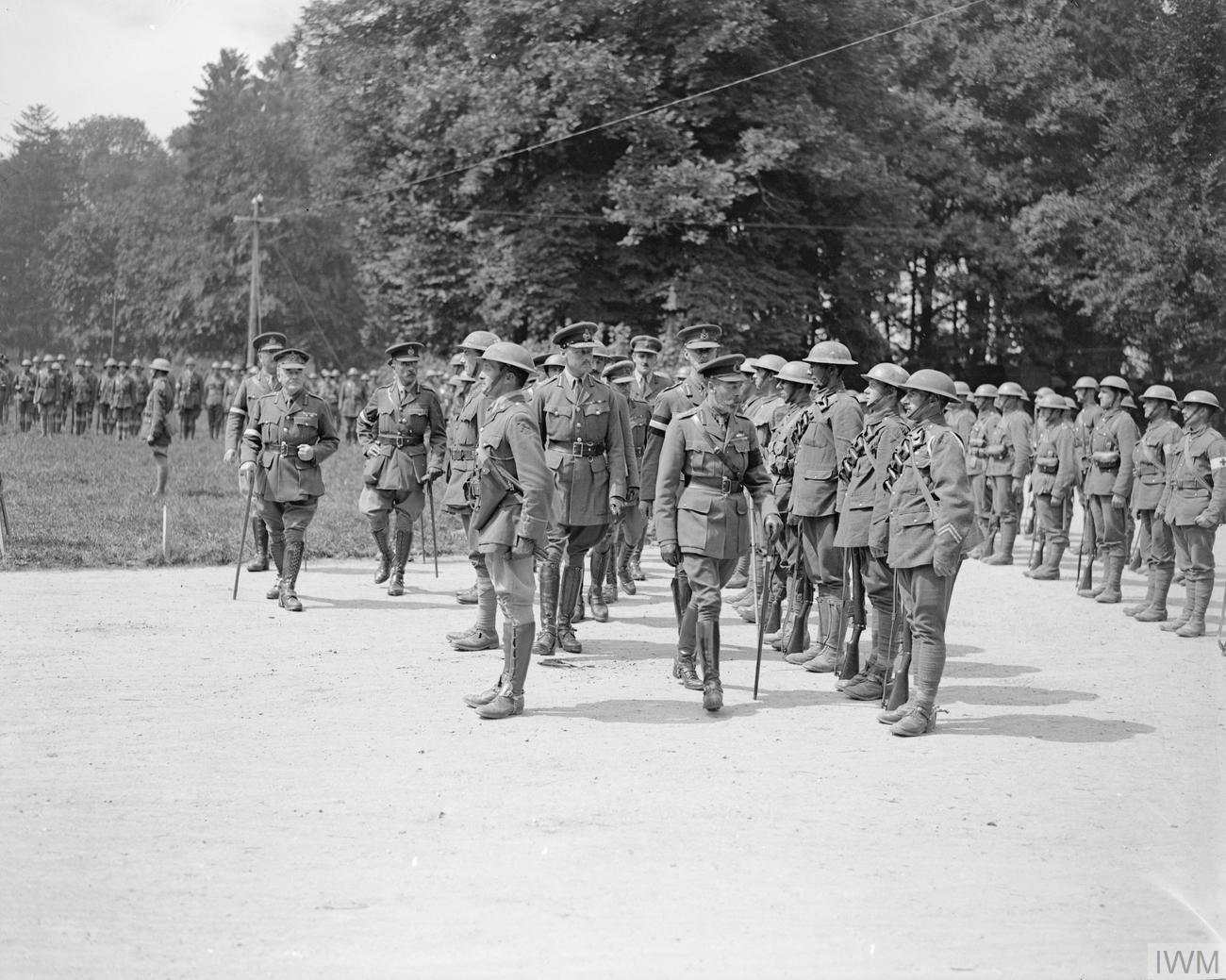
King George V inspecting the Guard of Honour on his visit to the III Corps headquarters at St. Gratien, 12 August 1918.

Pre-war planning for the British Expeditionary Force (BEF) did not envisage any intermediate headquarters between GHQ and the six infantry divisions. However, on mobilisation the decision was made to conform to the two-division army corps organisation employed by the French armies alongside which the BEF was to operate and corps HQs therefore had to be improvised. III Corps HQ was formed in France on 31 August 1914 under Sir William Pulteney, taking over 4th Division, part of which had already fought at Le Cateau, and 6th Division, which arrived in early September. It was first engaged in the First Battle of the Marne, and remained on the Western Front throughout the Great War.

=== First World War composition ===
The composition of army corps changed frequently. Some representative orders of battle for III Corps are given here.

As initially constituted:

General Officer Commanding: Major-General William Pulteney

- Brigadier-General, General Staff: J. P. Du Cane
- Brigadier-General, Royal Artillery: E. J. Phipps-Hornby, VC
- Commander, Royal Engineers: Brigadier-General F. M. Glubb
- 4th Division
- 6th Division
- 19th Independent Brigade (attached to III Corps 6 October 1914; became part of 6th Division 12 October 1914)

Order of Battle at start of the Battle of the Somme, 1 July 1916:

General Officer Commanding: Lieutenant-General Sir William Pulteney

- 8th Division
- 19th (Western) Division
- 34th Division

Order of Battle during the final advance in Artois, 8 October 1918:

General Officer Commanding: Lieutenant-General Richard Butler

- 55th (West Lancashire) Division
- 74th (Yeomanry) Division

== Second World War ==
During the Second World War, III Corps was formed in France under the command of Lieutenant-General Sir Ronald Forbes Adam to control forces of the British Expeditionary Force, after the expansion of that force had rendered control by just two corps headquarters cumbersome. The Corps was withdrawn from Dunkirk after the defeat of British forces by the Germans in May 1940.

=== Second World War composition ===
Order of Battle at Dunkirk:

GOC: Lieutenant-General Sir Ronald Forbes Adam (Lieutenant-General Sydney Rigby Wason after 26 May 1940)

- 42nd (East Lancashire) Infantry Division
- 44th (Home Counties) Infantry Division
- Royal Artillery
  - 5th Regiment, Royal Horse Artillery
  - 97th (Kent Yeomanry) Army Field Regiment
  - 51st (Midland) Medium Regiment
  - 56th (Highland) Medium Regiment
  - 54th (Argyll and Sutherland Highlanders) Light Anti-Aircraft Regiment
  - 3rd Survey Regiment
- III Corps Troops Royal Engineers
  - 213th, 214th, 217th Army Field Companies
  - 293rd Corps Field Park Company
  - 514th Corps Field Survey Company
- Infantry—Machine Gun
  - 7th Battalion, Royal Northumberland Fusiliers
  - 1/9th Battalion, Manchester Regiment
  - 1st Battalion, Princess Louise's Kensington Regiment, Middlesex Regiment

After commanding forces in the United Kingdom during late 1940, from the Old Rectory in Whitchurch, Shropshire within Western Command, the corps was used for deception purposes. It eventually ended up being transferred to Persia and Iraq Command as part of the British Tenth Army, under General Sir Edward P. Quinan. It took command of a number of formations there, including the British 5th Infantry Division.

On 16 October 1944 it became the headquarters for Lieutenant-General Ronald Scobie for operations in the Greek Civil War: at this point it received operational formations. Forces in Greece included 23rd Armoured Brigade. On 17 December 1944 it was redesignated HQ Land Forces and Military Liaison (Greece).

== General Officers Commanding ==
Commanders have included:

From 1901 to 1905 the commander of the troops in Ireland was also commander 3rd Army Corps.

- 1 October 1901: General the Duke of Connaught and Strathearn
  - December 1902–March 1903: Major-General Sir Hugh McCalmont (acting while the Duke of Connaught was on a tour of India)
- 10 May 1904: General Lord Grenfell
- 5 August 1914 – 16 February 1918 Lieutenant-General William Pulteney
- 16 February – 26 February 1918 Major-General R. P. Lee (acting)
- 26 February – 11 August 1918 Lieutenant-General Sir Richard Butler
- 11 August – 11 September 1918 Lieutenant-General Sir A. J. Godley (temporary)
- 11 September 1918 Lieutenant General Sir Richard Butler
- 1939 – June 1940 Lieutenant-General Ronald Adam
- June–November 1940 Lieutenant-General James Marshall-Cornwall
- 1940 – 1943 Lieutenant-General Desmond Anderson
- December 1943 – December 1944 Lieutenant-General Ronald Scobie
