= William Henry Johnson (VC) =

English Victoria Cross recipient (1890-1945)

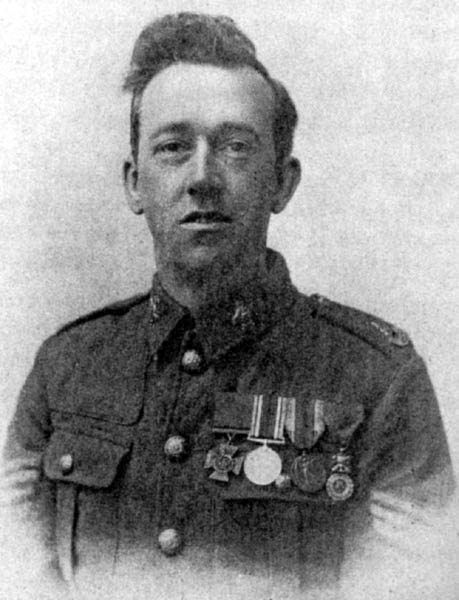
- Born: 15 October 1890; Worksop, Nottinghamshire
- Died: 25 April 1945 (aged 54); Arnold, Nottinghamshire
- Burial place: Redhill Cemetery
- Military career
- Allegiance: United Kingdom
- Branch: British Army
- Rank: Sergeant
- Units: The Sherwood Foresters; Home Guard
- Conflicts: World War I; World War II
- Awards: Victoria Cross; Médaille militaire

William Henry Johnson VC MM (15 October 1890 – 25 April 1945) was an English recipient of the Victoria Cross, the highest and most prestigious award for gallantry in the face of the enemy that can be awarded to British and Commonwealth forces.

He was 27 years old, and on 3 October 1918 at Ramicourt, France, he performed the gallant act, for which he was awarded the Victoria Cross.

== Details ==
Johnston was a sergeant in 1/5th Battalion, The Sherwood Foresters (The Nottinghamshire and Derbyshire Regiment), British Army during the First World War.

His VC was gazetted on 14 December 1918 with the following citation:

No. 306122 Sjt. William Henry Johnson, 1/5th Bn., Notts. & Derby. R. (T.F.) (Worksop).

For most conspicuous bravery at Ramicourt on the 3rd of October, 1918.

When his platoon was held up by a nest of enemy machine guns at very close range, Sjt. Johnson worked his way forward under very heavy fire, and single-handed charged the post, bayoneting several gunners and capturing two machine guns. During this attack he was severely wounded by a bomb, but continued to lead forward his men.

Shortly afterwards the line was once more held up by machine guns. Again he rushed forward and attacked the post singlehanded. With wonderful courage he bombed the garrison, put the guns out of action, and captured the teams.

He showed throughout the most exceptional gallantry and devotion to duty.

He was also awarded the French Médaille militaire.

He was in the Home Guard during World War II, but had to resign due to ill-health.

== Medal ==
His Victoria Cross is displayed at the Sherwood Foresters Museum, Nottingham Castle, England.

== Sources ==
- Monuments to Courage (David Harvey, 1999)
- The Register of the Victoria Cross (This England, 1997)
- Gliddon, Gerald (2000). VCs of the First World War - The Final Days 1918. Sutton Publishing. ISBN 0-7509-2485-3.

== Citation links ==
- Location of grave and VC medal (Nottinghamshire)
- The Victoria Cross Awards to the Sherwood Foresters (photos, site includes other articles on SF)
- Matt Davis (7 August 2013). "World War I tourism: Looking for your family hero". BBC News.
- "Sergeant William Henry Johnson (1890–1945), VC". Art UK.
- "My Tommy's War: W H Johnson – the bellringer VC". The National Archives. 3 October 2018.
- William Henry Johnson on Lives of the First World War
