= Philip Bowden-Smith =

Cavalry officer and commander in the British Army

Brigadier Philip Bowden-Smith CBE
- Born: 27 March 1891
- Died: 28 April 1964 (aged 73); Wokingham, England
- Military career
- Allegiance: United Kingdom
- Branch: Army
- Service years: 1910–1946
- Rank: Brigadier
- Nickname: "Bogey"
- Service number: 6782
- Units: 19th Royal Hussars; 4th Queen's Own Hussars; 16th/5th Lancers
- Commands: 16th/5th Lancers; 125th Infantry Brigade; 10th Armoured Brigade; 10th Tank Brigade
- Conflicts: World War I World War II
- Awards: Commander of the British Empire
- Other work: 1924 Summer Olympics; 1936 Summer Olympics

Brigadier Philip Ernest Bowden-Smith CBE (27 March 1891 – 28 April 1964), was a cavalry officer and later armoured commander of the British Army who served in the First World War and the Second World War. Described as 'one of the finest horsemen of his generation' he also represented Great Britain at the 1924 Olympic Games.

== Early life and career ==
Philip Ernest Bowden-Smith was born on 27 March 1891, the son of Ernest Bowden-Smith and Kate Mary née Moore-Miller. He was educated at Rugby School. He was commissioned as a second lieutenant into the 19th Hussars on 3 September 1910 (promoted to lieutenant 7 October 1912). The 19th Hussars' role on the mobilisation of the British Expeditionary Force (BEF) was to provide squadrons to the 4th, 5th and 6th Divisions. This is what happened o the outbreak of World War I in August 1914. Because Bowden-Smith's war service was recorded as starting on 9 September, he must have been with C Squadron, which landed with the 6th Division at St Nazaire on that day.

Divisional cavalry squadrons were very active in the early days of the war, when manoeuvre was still possible. Once trench warfare set in, their role disappeared. The squadrons of 19th Hussars reformed in April 1915 and joined the 1st Cavalry Division, but mounted action was rare, and if the cavalry did see action it was usually in the dismounted role. Bowden-Smith was wounded once during the war. At various times he found himself attached to the Signal Service and as a temporary instructor at the Cavalry School at Netheravon. He ended the war in the rank of captain.

After the war, the 19th Hussars deployed to Muttra in India. The cavalry arm was being reduced and 19th Hussars disappeared in a merger with another regiment. In 1921 Bowden-Smith transferred to the 4th Hussars, which was also at Muttra. Shortly afterwards he became an instructor at the Cavalry School, and in 1924 (after his participation in the Paris Olympics, see below) became an instructor at the Army School of Equitation at Weedon. He was promoted to Major on 16 May 1924, and on completion of his posting at Weedon, he transferred to the 16th/5th Lancers.

== Olympic Games ==
Bowden-Smith represented Great Britain at the 1924 Summer Olympics in Paris, participating in both the Eventing and Jumping events. His fourth place in the individual jumping, on Billy Boy, equalled Great Britain's best result to date in the equestrian events. Riding Gipsy, he was placed 29th in the individual eventing. Great Britain did not compete in the equestrian events at the 1928 or 1932 Olympics, but Bowden-Smith was team captain for Great Britain's equestrian team at the 1936 Summer Olympics in Berlin, where they won the bronze medal in the team eventing. This achievement was noteworthy, given the total dominance of the German team with their superior local knowledge of the tricky course. The team was raised from the Army School of Equitation at Weedon, where Bowden had been Chief Instructor.

== World War II ==
After the Berlin Olympics, Bowden-Smith, now a lieutenant colonel, became Commanding Officer of the 16th/5th Lancers at Secunderabad in India, but when the regiment began to convert to a light tank regiment, he returned to the UK in 1938 to take up a newly created post of Superintendent of the Army Equitation Centre and Remount Depot at Weedon. When World War II broke out, Bowden-Smith was Inspector of Remounts, becoming Inspector of Cavalry in 1940.

Eventually, mechanisation caught up with Bowden-Smith, and he became Second-in-Command of 22nd Armoured Brigade later in 1940. This brigade was composed of yeomanry cavalry regiments of the Territorial Army which had been converted to armoured car regiments after World War I, but had been transferred to the Royal Armoured Corps and were now training in the Cruiser tank role.

On 6 September 1941, Bowden-Smith was appointed Brigadier commanding 125th Infantry Brigade in 42nd (East Lancashire) Infantry Division. The division was scheduled to become an armoured division, and 125th Brigade officially became 10th Armoured Brigade on 1 November 1941.

Based at Barnard Castle, the brigade consisted of three battalions of the Lancashire Fusiliers (1/5th, 1/6th and 9th), which became 108th, 109th and 143rd Regiment Royal Armoured Corps respectively. As an armoured brigade in the cruiser role, 10th also had a motor infantry battalion (13th Highland Light Infantry) under command. However, 10th Armoured Brigade left 42nd Armoured Division in May 1942, the motor battalion was withdrawn, and on 25 July the brigade was redesignated 10th Tank Brigade. The role of a tank brigade was infantry support, so the brigade moved to the 'Dukeries' area of Nottinghamshire, where RAC units trained with infantry tanks. Bowden-Smith had his HQ at Carlton-in-Lindrick with the regiments dispersed to Thoresby Hall, Welbeck Abbey and Rufford Abbey.

On 17 October 1942 the brigade was placed under the command of 48th (South Midland) Division. This was a reserve formation, and 10th Tank Brigade was given the role of holding and training reinforcements for other tank units.

The brigade maintained Lancashire Fusilier traditions, marking Gallipoli Day on 25 April and celebrating Minden Day on 1 August 'in traditional style. Each unit held a ceremonial parade and march past'. When rumours began to circulate in August 1943 that 10th Tank Brigade was scheduled for disbandment, Members of Parliament for the Lancashire towns complained about the loss of their TA battalions. In August 1943 a recruiting team persuaded about 60 other ranks of the brigade to volunteer for the Parachute Regiment if the brigade disbanded. The brigade moved to Wensleydale in September, with Brigade HQ at Bedale, but shortly afterwards the impending disbandment was confirmed and the brigade came under direct War Office control. Bowden-Smith left on 6 October 1943, and the Brigade HQ and regiments disbanded in November.

Bowden-Smith was now posted to Delhi to join the staff of the new South East Asia Command (SEAC) under Admiral Lord Louis Mountbatten. He served on SEAC staff until 1946 when he retired.

== Later life ==
Bowden-Smith was an ADC to the King 1944–46, was awarded a CBE (Military) in 1946 and was appointed Colonel of the 16th/5th Lancers in 1950. He was an active Colonel of the regiment until he relinquished the post in 1959, and was also active in horsebreeding and foxhunting.

Brigadier Bowden-Smith died suddenly on 28 April 1964 at Wokingham. His surviving family were his two sisters, Marjorie Bowden-Smith and Doris Boden. His funeral was at St John's, Woking, on 1 May. A memorial service was held at St. Michael's Church, Chester Square.

== External sources ==
- Generals of World War II
