= 10th Armoured Brigade (United Kingdom) =

10th Armoured Brigade 10th Tank Brigade
- Active: 1941–1943
- Disbanded: 25 November 1943
- Country: United Kingdom
- Branch: Territorial Army
- Type: Armoured (later Tank) Brigade
- Role: Training
- Size: 3 Armoured regiments
- Anniversaries: Minden (1 Augustl)

Commanders
- Notable commanders: Brigadier Philip Bowden-Smith

The 10th Armoured Brigade was a short-lived armoured brigade of the British Army in the Second World War. It had been converted in November 1941 from 125th Infantry Brigade, but had never seen action and was disbanded in late 1943.

== Formation ==
The 10th Armoured Brigade came into existence on 1 November 1941 when 125th Infantry Brigade based at Barnard Castle was converted to the armoured role. The brigade had fought in the Battle of France and were evacuated from Dunkirk with 42nd (East Lancashire) Infantry Division, which was being converted to an armoured division, the 42nd Armoured Division. The brigade comprised three battalions of the Lancashire Fusiliers, two of them (1/5th and 1/6th) Territorial and one raised for war service, which were all converted to regiments of the Royal Armoured Corps (RAC), and a motor battalion was added. The brigade commander, Brigadier Philip Bowden-Smith, was a cavalryman (and former Olympic Equestrian) who had taken command of the 125th Brigade in September 1941, shortly before it was converted. He commanded 10th Armoured for almost its entire service.

=== Order of battle ===
10th Armoured Brigade was constituted as follows:

- 1/5th Battalion, Lancashire Fusiliers (TA) became 108th Regiment Royal Armoured Corps
- 1/6th Battalion, Lancashire Fusiliers (TA), became 109th Regiment Royal Armoured Corps
- 9th Battalion, Lancashire Fusiliers, became 143rd Regiment Royal Armoured Corps
- 13th Battalion, Highland Light Infantry (joined from 216th Independent Infantry Brigade (Home) 17 November 1941, left for 71st Infantry Brigade 13 June 1942)

=== Commanders ===
The following officers commanded 10th Armoured/Tank Brigade during the war:

- Brigadier P.E. Bowden-Smith (until 6 October 1943)
- Lieutenant Colonel J.A. Talbot-Ponsonby (Acting, from 6 October 1943)

== Service ==
Four days after the official conversion, 10th Armoured Brigade received its first equipment. The War Diary records: 'The first two tanks arrived, two Vickers Medium tanks dated 1923 and 1924. These were not in going order, and were practically useless'. The brigade got its first cruiser tanks – four Covenanters – on 1 December, and over the next two years received a trickle of widely varied tanks, including Cruiser Mk I, Cruiser Mk II, Cruiser Mk IIa, Covenanter and Crusader cruiser tanks, Valentine and Churchill infantry tanks, and later some Sherman Vs.

In May 1942, 10th Armoured Brigade left 42nd Armoured Division and the motor battalion was withdrawn. Then, on 25 July, the brigade was redesignated 10th Tank Brigade. The role of a tank brigade was infantry support. On 17 October 1942, the brigade was placed under the command of 48th (South Midland) Division, which was a reserve formation, and was given the role of holding and training reinforcements for other tank units.

For training, 10th Tank Brigade was based in the 'Dukeries' area of Nottinghamshire, with HQ at Carlton-in-Lindrick and the regiments at Thoresby Hall, Welbeck Abbey and Rufford Abbey.

== Disbandment ==
The brigade maintained Lancashire Fusilier traditions, initially wearing the regimental badge on the black beret of the RAC, and celebrating Minden Day on 1 August 'in traditional style. Each unit held a ceremonial parade and march past'. When rumours began to circulate that 10th Tank Brigade was scheduled for disbandment, Members of Parliament for the Lancashire towns complained about the loss of their TA battalions. In August 1943, a recruiting team persuaded about 60 other ranks of the brigade to volunteer for the Parachute Regiment if the brigade disbanded. The brigade moved to Wensleydale in September, with Brigade HQ at Bedale, but shortly afterwards the impending disbandment was confirmed, the brigade came under direct War Office control, and the regiments began to dispose of their equipment to other regiments. Brigade HQ and Signals were disbanded with effect from 25 November and completed by 16 December.

Of the three tank regiments, 108 and 109 RAC (formerly 1/5th and 1/6th Lancashire Fusiliers TA) were "dispersed", while 143 RAC (formerly the hostilities-only 9th Lancashire Fusiliers) was disbanded. Of these battalions, only the 5th Battalion, Lancashire Fusiliers was reconstituted in the Territorial Army after the war.

== See also ==
- British Armoured formations of World War II
- List of British brigades of the Second World War

== Bibliography ==
- Forty, George (1998). British Army Handbook 1939–1945. Stroud, Gloucestershire: Sutton Publishing Limited. ISBN 0-7509-1403-3.
- Joslen, H. F. (2003) [1960]. Orders of Battle: Second World War, 1939–1945. Uckfield, East Sussex: Naval and Military Press. ISBN 978-1-84342-474-1.
