= 48th (South Midland) Division =

Infantry division of the British Army

South Midland Division 48th (South Midland) Division 48th (South Midland) Infantry Division 48th Infantry (Reserve) Division
- The divisional insignia. Historian Michael Chappell comments that starting in 1918 the white diamond "was painted on helmets ... with regimental badges superimposed" upon it.
- Active: 1908–1919; 1920–1945
- Country: United Kingdom
- Branch: British Army
- Type: Infantry
- Role: Infantry, home defence, and training
- Size: Division
- Peacetime HQ: Warwick
- Engagements: First World War; Second World War

Commanders
- Notable commanders: Robert Fanshawe; Sir Harold Walker; Frank Roberts; Sir Andrew Thorne

Insignia
- Identification symbol: Divisional insignia adopted following the Battle of France in 1940.

The 48th (South Midland) Division was an infantry division of the British Army. Part of the Territorial Force (TF) and raised in 1908, the division was originally called the South Midland Division, and was redesignated as the 48th (South Midland) Division in 1915. During the First World War, the division saw service on the Western Front before being transferred to the Italian Front in November 1917 and remaining there for the rest of the war.

Reformed in 1920 in the Territorial Army (TA) as the 48th (South Midland) Infantry Division, it saw active service in the Second World War with the British Expeditionary Force (BEF) in Belgium and France before being evacuated from Dunkirk to the United Kingdom. It was converted into a training reserve division in December 1942, remaining in the United Kingdom in that status for the rest of the war. Disbanded after the war, the division was not reformed again. In both world wars, the division raised a second line reserve formation; the 61st (2nd South Midland) Division in the First World War, and 61st Division in the Second World War.

== Formation ==
In 1901, following lessons learned from the Second Boer War and diplomatic clashes with the growing German Empire, the United Kingdom sought to reform the British Army so it would be able to engage in European affairs if required. This task fell to Secretary of State for War, Richard Haldane who implemented several policies known as the Haldane Reforms. As part of these reforms, the Territorial and Reserve Forces Act 1907 created a new Territorial Force by merging the existing Yeomanry and Volunteer Force in 1908. This resulted in the creation of 14 Territorial Divisions, including the South Midland Division.

As part of the legislation, the territorials were only liable to serve within the United Kingdom. Haldane envisioned that the territorials would take over the defence of the country against what was perceived as a very real threat of invasion, which would allow the regular army to be deployed aboard. In addition, Haldane saw the territorials as a source of reinforcements for the regular army. Six months following mobilisation, during which time the troops would have come up to an acceptable training standard, Haldane was confident that up to a quarter of the men would opt to go and fight abroad.

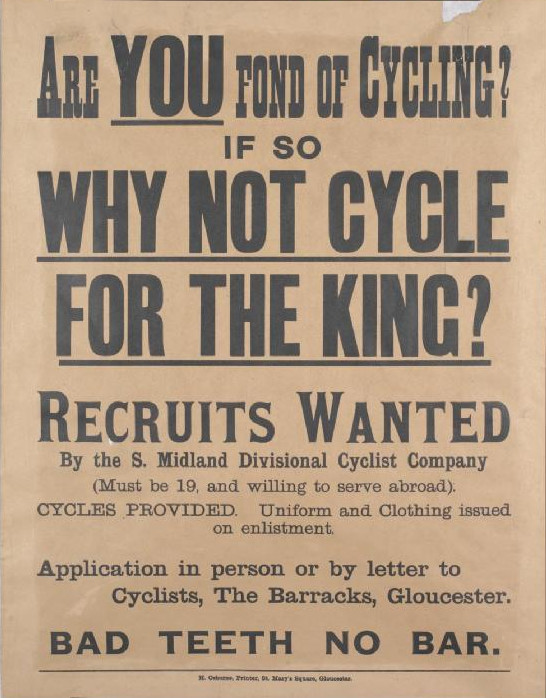
Recruiting poster for the South Midland Divisional Cyclist Company.

The 1910 edition of the Hazell's Annual reported that, in 1909, "The South Midland Division ... had 13 units up to or over establishment, and the others very little below it." The following year, the Territorial Force as a whole peaked at a strength of 276,000 men; 26,000 men short of the peacetime establishment set by Haldane's reforms. However, between 1910 and 1914, the overall strength of the force had declined to 250,000, 52,000 short of the peacetime establishment. In peacetime, the divisional headquarters was in the Old Barracks in Warwick.

== First World War ==
=== 1914 ===
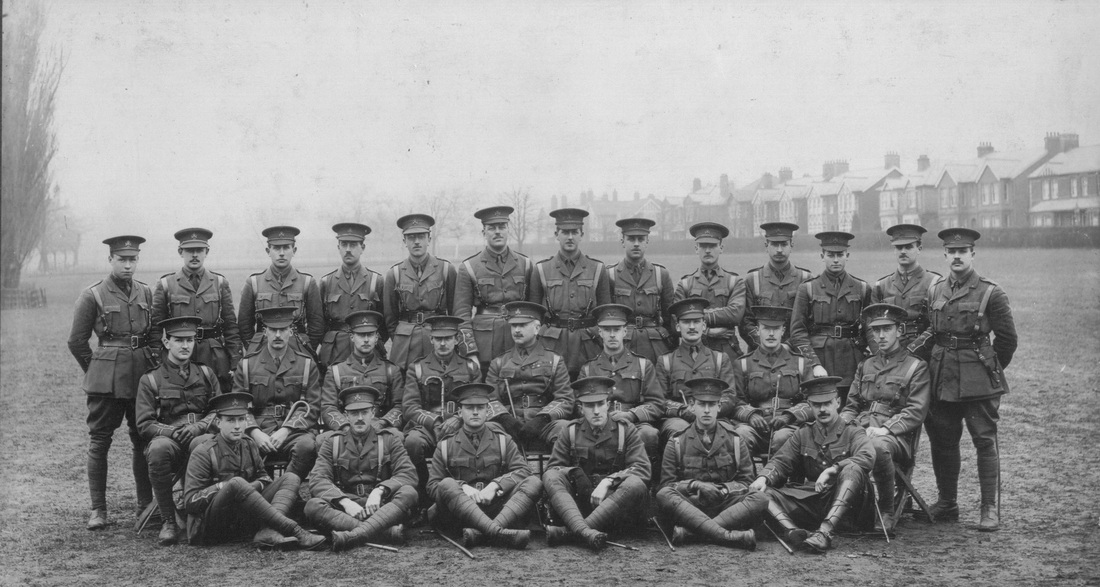
Officers of the 1st Buckinghamshire Battalion, Oxfordshire and Buckinghamshire Light Infantry, at Chelmsford, Essex, 1914.

On the outbreak of the First World War in the summer of 1914, the division composed the Warwickshire Brigade, the Gloucester and Worcester Brigade and the South Midland Brigade. In August 1914, the South Midland Division departed for its annual summer training camp. The Warwickshire Brigade, for example, departed for Rhyl in Northern Wales.

Following the declaration of war, the division was mobilised and moved south to take up defensive positions along the southern coast. Due to German-invasion scares, the division-numbering 6,000 men-moved to Essex. While there was no invasion, the division remained in the area on defensive duties and to continue training.

During the opening weeks of the war, as the Territorials were not required to be deployed overseas, the troops were asked to volunteer. By the end of August, more than 70 battalions across the TF had volunteered, with the number rising higher as the year progressed.

=== 1915–1918 ===
In March 1915, with the threat of a German invasion having subsided, the South Midland Division was dispatched to France with the Territorials who had volunteered for overseas service.

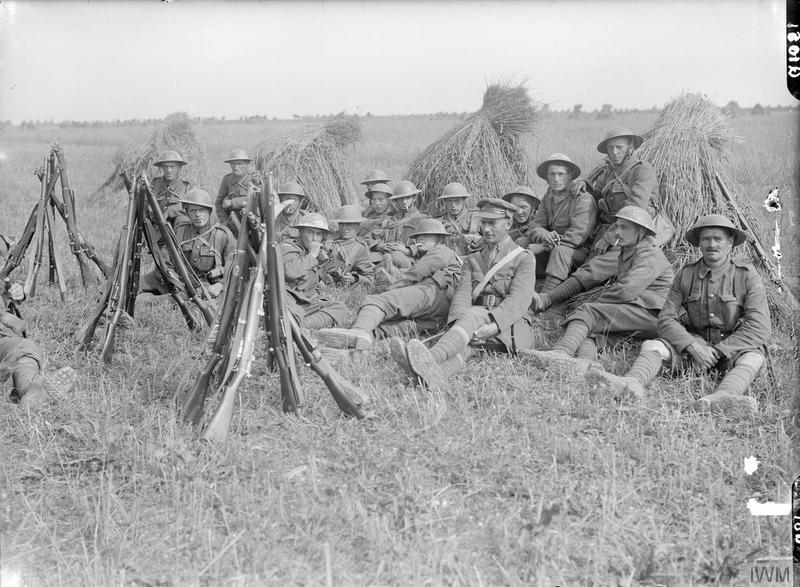
Lieutenant Baxter's platoon, C Company, 1/7th Battalion, Worcestershire Regiment, resting in a cornfield near Lavieville, France, September 1916.

On 13 May 1915 the division was numbered, becoming the 48th (South Midland) Division and the brigades in the division were also numbered, the Warwickshire Brigade became the 143rd (Warwickshire) Brigade, the Gloucester and Worcester Brigade became the 144th (Gloucester and Worcester) Infantry Brigade and the South Midland Brigade became the 145th (South Midland) Infantry Brigade.

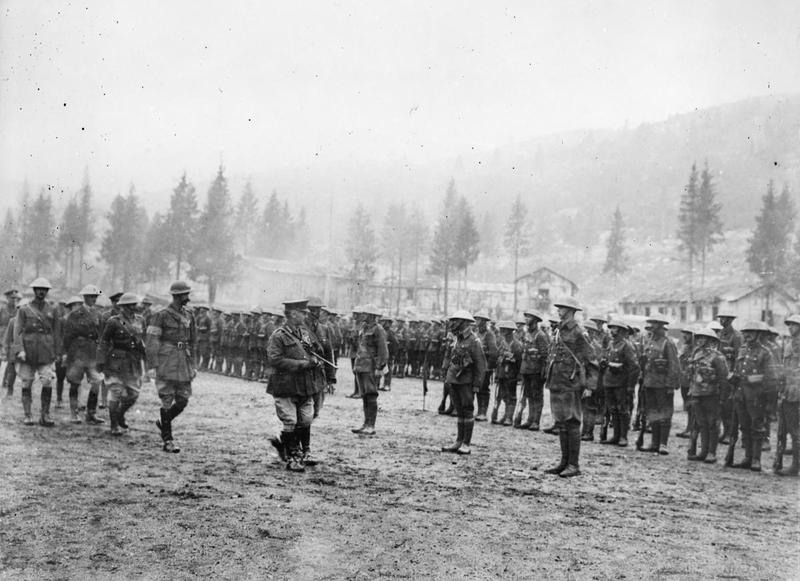
General The Earl of Cavan, commanding the British forces in Italy, inspecting men of the 48th Division, Granezza, Asiago, September, 1918.

The members of the division who did not, or were not able to, volunteer for overseas service, were transferred to newly created second line units intended for home defence. These second line units were eventually formed into the 61st (2nd South Midland) Division and, following the passing of the Military Service Act 1916, deployed to France in May 1916.

The division, now commanded by Major General Robert Fanshawe, who would command for just over three years, took part in the Battle of the Somme in 1916, the Battle of Pozières and the Battle of Passchendaele (also known as the Third Battle of Ypres) in the following year.

In November 1917, the division was sent to the Italian front, where it remained until the end of the war. It fought the Battle of the Piave River (15–16 June 1918) and the Battle of Vittorio Veneto from October to November.

48th (South Midland) Division (1914–1918)

143rd (Warwickshire) Brigade

- 1/5th Battalion, Royal Warwickshire Regiment
- 1/6th Battalion, Royal Warwickshire Regiment
- 1/7th Battalion, Royal Warwickshire Regiment
- 1/8th Battalion, Royal Warwickshire Regiment (until September 1918) (Note: 1/8th Warwicks, 1/8th Worcs and 1/5th Glosters left the division on 11 and 12 September 1918 and proceeded to the BEF on the Western Front where they joined 75th Brigade, 25th Division.)
- 143rd Machine Gun Company, Machine Gun Corps (formed 8 January 1916; moved to 48th Battalion, Machine Gun Corps on 22 March 1918)
- 143rd Trench Mortar Battery (formed 14 June 1916)

144th (Gloucester and Worcester) Brigade

- 1/4th (City of Bristol) Battalion, Gloucestershire Regiment
- 1/6th Battalion, Gloucestershire Regiment
- 1/7th Battalion, Worcestershire Regiment
- 1/8th Battalion, Worcestershire Regiment (until September 1918)
- 144th Machine Gun Company, Machine Gun Corps (formed 23 January 1916; moved to 48th Battalion, Machine Gun Corps on 22 March 1918)
- 144th Trench Mortar Battery (formed 14 June 1916)

145th (South Midland) Brigade

- 1/5th Battalion, Gloucestershire Regiment (until September 1918)
- 1/4th Battalion, Oxfordshire and Buckinghamshire Light Infantry
- 1/1st Buckinghamshire Battalion, Oxfordshire and Buckinghamshire Light Infantry
- 1/4th Battalion, Princess Charlotte of Wales's (Royal Berkshire Regiment)
- 145th Machine Gun Company, Machine Gun Corps (formed 11 January 1916, moved to 48th Battalion, Machine Gun Corps on 22 March 1918)
- 145th Trench Mortar Battery (formed 14 June 1916)

Mounted Troops

- 'B' Squadron, 1st King Edward's Horse (joined 24 April 1915, joined IV Corps Cavalry Regiment on 13 May 1916)
- South Midland Divisional Cyclist Company (formed on 3 December 1914, joined VIII Corps Cyclist Battalion on 14 May 1916)

48th (South Midland) Divisional Artillery

- Royal Field Artillery (Note: The divisional artillery was originally organised as 9 batteries of four 15 pounders and 2 batteries of four 5" howitzers. By January 1917, it had been re-armed with modern weapons and reorganised with 6 batteries of six 18 pounders and 2 batteries of six 4.5" howitzers.)
  - XXCL (I South Midland) Brigade
    - 1/1st, 1/2nd, 1/3rd Gloucestershire Batteries
    - I South Midland Brigade Ammunition Column
  - CCXLI (II South Midland) Brigade
    - 1/1st, 1/2nd, 1/3rd Worcestershire Batteries
    - II South Midland Brigade Ammunition Column
  - CCXLII (III South Midland) Brigade (became an Army Field Artillery Brigade on 20 January 1917)
    - 1/1st, 1/2nd, 1/3rd Warwickshire Batteries
    - III South Midland Brigade Ammunition Column
  - CCXLIII (IV South Midland) (Howitzer) Brigade (broken up 16 October 1916)
    - 1/4th, 1/5th Warwickshire (H) Batteries
    - IV South Midland (H) Brigade Ammunition Column
  - 48th Divisional Ammunition Column
- Heavy Artillery
  - South Midland (Warwickshire) Heavy Battery, Royal Garrison Artillery (left 16 April 1915)
- Trench Mortar Batteries
  - V/48 Heavy Trench Mortar Battery (formed 21 April 1916, disbanded 10 November 1917)
  - X/48, Y/48 and Z/48 Medium Mortar Batteries, RFA (formed 15 March 1916; on 21 March 1918 Z was absorbed by X and Y)

48th (South Midland) Divisional Engineers

- 474th (1/1st South Midland) Field Company (left 4 December 1914, rejoined 1 May 1915)
- 475th (1/2nd South Midland) Field Company
- 1/1st West Lancashire Field Company (attached 18–28 April 1915)
- 7th Field Company (joined 29 April 1915, left 17 June 1915)
- 477th (2/1st South Midland) Field Company (joined 10 June 1915)
- 48th (South Midland) Divisional Signal Company

Pioneers

- 1/5th (Cinque Ports) Battalion, Royal Sussex Regiment (joined 21 August 1915)

Machine Gun Units

- 251st Machine Gun Company (joined 16 November 1917, moved to 48th Battalion, Machine Gun Corps on 22 March 1918)
- 48th Battalion, Machine Gun Corps (formed 22 March 1918 with 143rd, 144th, 145th and 251st Companies)

Medical and Veterinary

- 1/1st South Midland Field Ambulance, Royal Army Medical Corps
- 1/2nd South Midland Field Ambulance, Royal Army Medical Corps
- 1/3rd South Midland Field Ambulance, Royal Army Medical Corps
- 1st South Midland Mobile Veterinary Section Army Veterinary Corps
- 48th (1/1st South Midland) Sanitary Section, Royal Army Medical Corps (formed 21 February 1915, left for III Corps 4 April 1917)
- 48th (1/1st South Midland) Ambulance Workshop (joined in concentration area, absorbed in Divisional Supply Column on 4 April 1916)

Divisional Train, Army Service Corps

- 459th (Divisional Headquarters) Company, ASC
- 460th (Warwickshire Brigade) Company, ASC
- 461st (Gloucester and Worcester Brigade) Company, ASC
- 462nd (South Midland Brigade) Company, ASC

Others

- 242nd Divisional Employment Company (formed 16 June 1917)

== Interwar ==
After the war, the 48th Divisional Signal Company was posted to Iran as part of Norperforce. The division was disbanded in June 1919, along with the rest of the Territorial Force. However, the Territorial Force was reformed in 1920 as the Territorial Army (TA) and the 48th Division was reconstituted as the 48th (South Midland) Infantry Division.

During the interwar period, the British Army envisioned that, during future conflicts, the Territorial Army would be used as the basis for future expansion so as to avoid raising a new Kitchener's Army. However, as the 1920s and 1930s wore on, the British Government prioritised funding for the regular army over the territorials, allowing recruitment and equipment levels to languish. Baron Templemore, as part of a House of Lords debate on the Territorial Army, stated that the division - on 1 October 1924 - mustered 338 officers and 7,721 other ranks. Historian David French highlights that "by April 1937 the Territorial Army had reached less than 80 per cent of its shrunken peacetime establishment" and "Its value as an immediate reserve was, therefore, limited." Edward Smalley comments that "48th Divisional Signals operated on an improvised organizational structure" for most of the 1930s, due to being below 50 per cent strength. He further highlights how the TA, and the division in particular, "never kept pace with technological developments." In 1937, the division was operating just two radio sets on a full-time basis and had to borrow additional units from the 3rd Infantry Division for annual training camps.

== Second World War ==
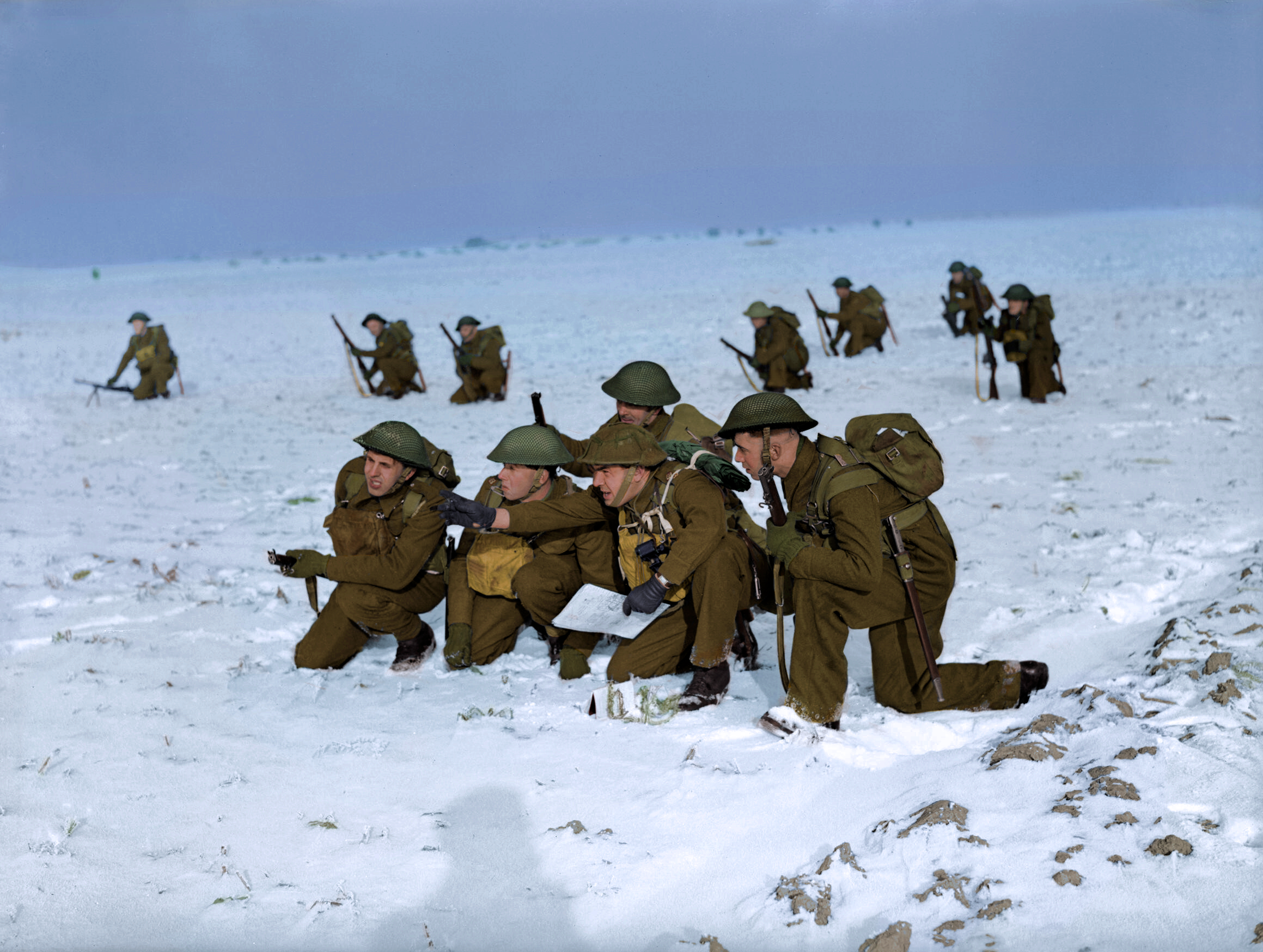
An officer briefs his section leaders during an exercise in the snow by men of the 1/7th Battalion, Royal Warwickshire Regiment, between Douai and Orchies, France, 26 January 1940.

On the outbreak of the Second World War, the 48th Division was mobilised in early September 1939, under the command of Major General Frank Roberts, who had won the Victoria Cross (VC) in the Great War. After spending a few months in England training the division, now commanded by Major General Sir Andrew Thorne after Roberts' retirement in December, landed in France in early January 1940 and became part of the British Expeditionary Force (BEF), the first complete division of the TA to do so. The division came under command of Lieutenant General Sir John Dill's I Corps. Soon after their arrival, the 48th Division exchanged some of its units with the Regular divisions. For example, in the 143rd Brigade, the 5th Battalion, Northamptonshire Regiment was exchanged with the 1st Battalion, Oxfordshire and Buckinghamshire Light Infantry, a Regular Army unit, and transferred to the 11th Infantry Brigade, of the 4th Infantry Division. This was official policy within the BEF and was, in theory, intended to strengthen the inexperienced Territorial divisions with experienced Regulars.

=== France and Dunkirk ===
When the Germans invaded France and the Low Countries on 10 May 1940, the BEF moved forward to occupy pre-planned positions in Belgium, but the rapid German breakthrough into France caused it to retreat towards Dunkirk.

On 23 May, 48th Division was pulled out to form a new defence line along the canal between Saint-Omer and the coast. Lord Gort's BEF story describes the distinguished and heroic defence by General Thorne, commanding the 48th Division and the delaying actions of his 145th Brigade at Cassel and Hazebrouck and 144th Brigade at Wormhoudt, saying that "it was their defence on the western side of the corridor in the closing stages that allowed so many of their comrades to pass into safety". The 48th and 44th Divisions withstood repeated attacks along the 20 mile frontage. On 28 May when the front began to crumble all around them, they were ordered to continue to hold for a few more hours. The garrison from 145 Brigade at Hazebrouck was overrun but some elements at Cassel and 144 Brigade at Wormhoudt withdrew that night. The remnants of 44th division and 48th Division were attached to 1st Corps and the last to leave the beaches on 30 May.

During the same time frame the 48th divisional CRA (Commander, Royal Artillery), Brigadier Edward Lawson, was sent with 'X Force' of artillery, machine guns and infantry ahead of the division to occupy the chosen positions. However, the unexpected surrender of Belgian forces on 27 May 1940 led to a gap appearing between 48th Division in action around Saint-Omer and the coast at Nieuwpoort. Until II Corps could arrive to plug this gap, Lawson was responsible for what the Official History calls 'the most dangerously exposed part of the bridgehead'. He was ordered by the commander of the Dunkirk perimeter, the III Corps commander Lieutenant-General Ronald Adam, to improvise a defence line along the canal and prevent the Germans breaking through to the vital beaches east of Dunkirk where much of the BEF was waiting to be evacuated. At 11.00 on 28 May, advanced German troops reached the canal line, but Lawson seized on the Territorial gunners of the 53rd (London) Medium Regiment, RA who were marching towards Dunkirk having fired off all their ammunition and destroyed their guns. Together with detachments of Regular gunners from both the 2nd Medium and 1st Heavy Anti-Aircraft Regiments, and sappers from 7th Field Company, Royal Engineers, they fought as infantry to hold the line. They came under heavy mortar and machine gun fire, and the Germans seized a bridgehead at Nieuwpoort, but all subsequent attacks that day were repulsed. Brigadier Lawson's scratch force was relieved next day and then evacuated to Britain.

48th (South Midland) Infantry Division (1939–40)

143rd Infantry Brigade

Main article: 143rd Infantry Brigade
- 1/7th Battalion, Royal Warwickshire Regiment
- 8th Battalion, Royal Warwickshire Regiment
- 5th Battalion, Northamptonshire Regiment(until 29 January 1940)
- 1st Battalion, Oxfordshire and Buckinghamshire Light Infantry (from 29 January 1940)
- 143rd Infantry Brigade Anti-Tank Company

144th Infantry Brigade

Main article: 144th Infantry Brigade
- 5th Battalion, Gloucestershire Regiment
- 7th Battalion, Worcestershire Regiment (until 5 February 1940)
- 8th Battalion, Worcestershire Regiment
- 2nd Battalion, Royal Warwickshire Regiment (from 5 February 1940 until 9 December 1940)
- 11th Battalion, South Staffordshire Regiment (from 9 December 1940)
- 144th Infantry Brigade Anti-Tank Company

145th Infantry Brigade

Main article: 145th Infantry Brigade
- 4th Battalion, Oxfordshire and Buckinghamshire Light Infantry
- 1st Buckinghamshire Battalion, Oxfordshire and Buckinghamshire Light Infantry
- 4th Battalion, Royal Berkshire Regiment (until 5 February 1940)
- 2nd Battalion, Gloucestershire Regiment (from 5 February 1940)
- 145th Infantry Brigade Anti-Tank Company

Divisional Troops

- 67th (South Midland) Field Regiment, Royal Artillery (until 31 January 1940)
- 68th (South Midland) Field Regiment, Royal Artillery
- 99th (Buckinghamshire Yeomanry) Field Regiment, Royal Artillery (until 1 February 1940)
- 18th Field Regiment, Royal Artillery (from 1 February 1940)
- 24th Field Regiment, Royal Artillery (from 31 January 1940)
- 115th (North Midland) Field Regiment, Royal Artillery (from 19 May 1940)
- 53rd (Worcestershire Yeomanry) Anti-tank Regiment, Royal Artillery
- 48th (South Midland) Divisional Engineers
  - 224th (South Midland) Field Company
  - 225th (South Midland) Field Company (until 16 February 1940)
  - 226th (South Midland) Field Company
  - 9th Field Company (from 16 February 1940)
  - 227th (South Midland) Field Park Company
- 48th (South Midland) Divisional Signals, Royal Corps of Signals
- 1st Battalion, Lothians and Border Horse, Royal Armoured Corps (until 27 April 1940)

=== Home defence and training ===
The 48th Division, much depleted in numbers, completed its return to the United Kingdom on 1 June. The division, commanded from 18 June by Major General Roderic Petre, was subsequently posted to Western Command, Southern Command, and VIII Corps and began training in preparation to repel Operation Sea Lion, the German invasion of England, which proved abortive.

During the war, the divisions of the British Army were divided between "Higher Establishment" and "Lower Establishment" formations. The former were intended for deployment overseas for field operations, whereas the latter were strictly for home defence in a static role. During November 1941, the division was placed on the "Lower Establishment" and assigned to I Corps District, commanded by Lieutenant General Henry Willcox.

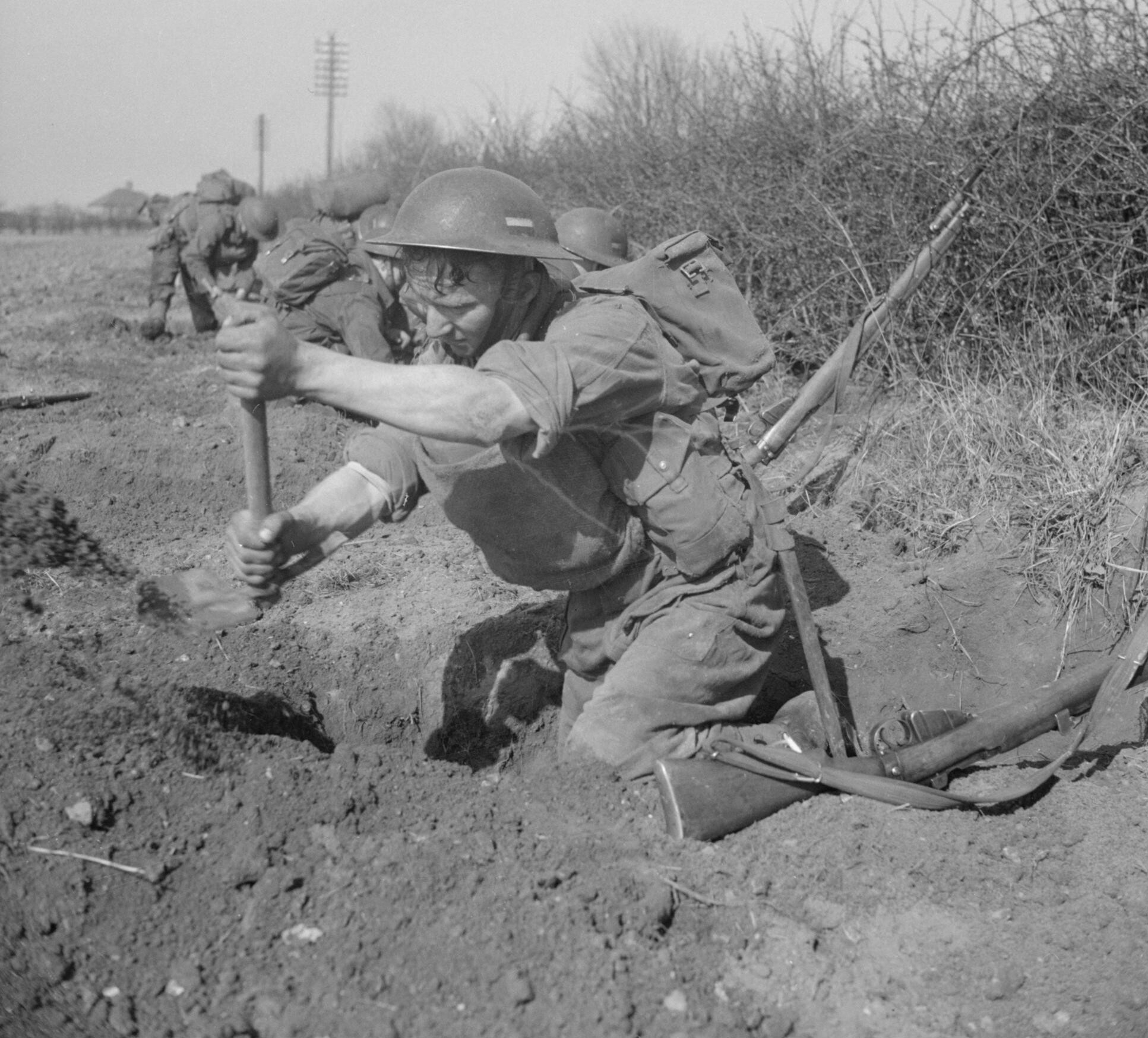
Men of the 1/7th Battalion, Royal Warwickshire Regiment, digging in with entrenching tools during training at Horncastle, 15 April 1942.

During the winter of 1942–43, the British Army overhauled its training of recruits. The 48th was one of three divisions that were changed from "Lower Establishment" units to "Reserve Divisions". On 20 December, the division was renamed the 48th Infantry (Reserve) Division, becoming a training formation in the process. This reorganisation took place during 1943 and the division held this training role for the remainder of the war. These three divisions were supplemented by a fourth training formation (the 80th Infantry (Reserve) Division), which was raised on 1 January 1943. The 48th Infantry (Reserve) Division was assigned to Northern Command Soldiers who had completed their corps training were sent to these training divisions. (Note: Having entered military service, a recruit was assigned to the General Service Corps. They would then undertake six weeks training at a Primary Training Centre and take aptitude and intelligence tests. The recruit would then be posted to a Corps Training Centre specialising in the arm of the service they were joining. For those who would be joining the infantry, corps training involved a further sixteen week course. For more specialised roles, such as signallers, it could be up to thirty weeks.) The soldiers were given five weeks of additional training at the section, platoon and company level, before undertaking a final three-day exercise. Troops would then be ready to be sent overseas to join other formations. Training was handled in this manner to relieve the "Higher Establishment" divisions from being milked for replacements for other units and to allow them to intensively train without having to cope with recruits. During this period, from 17 October 1942 until 30 September 1943, the 10th Tank Brigade was assigned to the division for the holding and training of reinforcements to armoured units. On 7 November 1943, the 145th Infantry Brigade was disbanded.

On 30 June 1944, the 48th Infantry (Reserve) Division, along with the other training divisions (the 76th, 77th, and the 80th), had a combined total of 22,355 men. Of this number, only 1,100 were immediately available as replacements for the 21st Army Group, at the time of Operation Overlord and the Battle of Normandy. (Note: The war establishment—the paper strength—of a "Higher Establishment" infantry division in 1944 was 18,347 men.) The remaining 21,255 men were considered ineligible for service abroad due to a variety of reasons, ranging from medical, not being considered fully fit or insufficiently trained. Over the following six months, up to 75 per cent of these men were deployed to reinforce the 21st Army Group, following the completion of their training and having met the required fitness levels. In 2007, Stephen Hart wrote that, by September, the 21st Army Group "had bled Home Forces dry of draftable riflemen", due to the losses suffered in the Battle of Normandy, leaving the army in Britain (with the exception of the 52nd (Lowland) Infantry Division) with just "young lads, old men and the unfit".

Due to the decreased need for such a formation, the division was disbanded after the war on 1 November 1945.

48th (South Midland) Infantry Division (1941–45)

143rd Infantry Brigade

Main article: 143rd Infantry Brigade
- 1/7th Battalion, Royal Warwickshire Regiment (until 3 October 1942)
- 8th Battalion, Royal Warwickshire Regiment (until 13 July 1944)
- 143rd Infantry Brigade Anti-Tank Company (until 1 April 1941)
- 1st Battalion, Oxfordshire and Buckinghamshire Light Infantry (until 9 November 1941))
- 10th Battalion, Somerset Light Infantry (from 16 November 1941 until 3 September 1942)
- 8th Battalion, Suffolk Regiment (from 4 September 1942 until 26 July 1944)
- 11th Battalion, Green Howards (from 13 September 1942)
- 5th Battalion, West Yorkshire Regiment (from 26 July until 23 August 1944)
- 10th Battalion, Duke of Wellington's Regiment (from 28 July 1944)
- 11th Battalion, York and Lancaster Regiment (from 1 August 1944)
- 1st Battalion, Sherwood Foresters (23-31 July 1944)
- 11th Battalion, West Yorkshire Regiment (from 24 August 1944)

144th Infantry Brigade

Main article: 144th Infantry Brigade
- 5th Battalion, Gloucestershire Regiment (until 21 April 1941, then converted into 48th Battalion, Reconnaissance Corps)
- 8th Battalion, Worcestershire Regiment (until 9 July 1944)
- 144th Infantry Brigade Anti-Tank Company (11 February 1941)
- 11th Battalion, South Staffordshire Regiment (until 1 January 1943)
- 9th Battalion, Somerset Light Infantry (from 20 April 1941 until 13 September 1942)
- 31st Battalion, Royal Ulster Rifles (19-27 September 1942)
- 7th Battalion, Royal Ulster Rifles (from 27 September 1942 until 14 November 1943)
- 17th Battalion, Royal Fusiliers(from 10 December 1942 until 19 November 1943)
- 4th Battalion, Oxfordshire and Buckinghamshire Light Infantry (from 2 November 1943 until 9 July 1944)
- 5th Battalion, Royal Inniskilling Fusiliers (from 19 November 1943 until 9 July 1944)
- 10th Battalion, Cameronians (Scottish Rifles) (from 23 July 1944)
- 9th Battalion, Seaforth Highlanders (from 24 July 1944)
- 10th Battalion, Black Watch (Royal Highland Regiment) (from 22 July 1944)
- 2nd Battalion, London Scottish (from 10 September 1944)

145th Infantry Brigade (until 6 November 1943)

Main article: 145th Infantry Brigade
- 4th Battalion, Oxfordshire and Buckinghamshire Light Infantry (until 2 November 1943)
- 1st Buckinghamshire Battalion, Oxfordshire and Buckinghamshire Light Infantry (until 12 December 1942)
- 145th Infantry Brigade Anti-Tank Company (until 11 February 1940)
- 2nd Battalion, Gloucestershire Regiment (until 10 December 1942)
- 6th Battalion, King's Own Royal Regiment (Lancaster) (from 12 December 1942 until 6 November 1943)
- 5th Battalion, Royal Inniskilling Fusiliers (from 3 January 1943 until 6 November 1943)

10th Tank Brigade (from 17 October 1942 until 30 September 1943)

Main article: 10th Tank Brigade
- 108th Regiment Royal Armoured Corps
- 109th Regiment Royal Armoured Corps
- 143rd Regiment Royal Armoured Corps

Divisional Troops

- 68th Field Regiment, Royal Artillery (until 22 August 1942)
- 18th Field Regiment, Royal Artillery (until 12 February 1941)
- 24th Field Regiment, Royal Artillery (until 22 August 1942)
- 23rd Field Regiment, Royal Artillery (from 13 February 1941 until 14 November 1941)
- 173rd Field Regiment, Royal Artillery (from 12 January 1942 until 30 March 1943)
- 180th Field Regiment, Royal Artillery (from 26 December 1942 until 31 August 1944)
- 120th (South Midland) Field Regiment, Royal Artillery (from 1 September 1944)
- 168th Medium Regiment, Royal Artillery (from 10 April 1945 until 29 June 1945)
- 12th Medium Regiment, Royal Artillery (from 9 July 1945)
- 53rd Anti-tank Regiment, Royal Artillery (until 14 October 1941)
- 93rd Anti-tank Regiment, Royal Artillery (from 12 November 1941 until 7 August 1942)
- 96th Anti-tank Regiment, Royal Artillery (from 5 September 1942)
- 48th (South Midland) Divisional Engineers, Royal Engineers
  - 224th Field Company(until 13 March 1943)
  - 226th Field Company
  - 9th Field Company (until 12 November 1941)
  - 792nd Field Company (from 30 May 1945)
  - 227th Field Park Company (until 13 December 1941)
  - Divisional Field Stores, 77th Section
  - Divisional Field Stores, 77th Platoon
- 48th Divisional Signals, Royal Corps of Signals (until 19 December 1942)
- 48th (Reserve) Divisional Signals, Royal Corps of Signals (from 20 December 1942)
- Reconnaissance
  - 5th Battalion, Gloucestershire Regiment (from 12 July 1941, converted into 48th Battalion, Reconnaissance Corps 14 October, transferred to 43rd (Wessex) Infantry Division 18 November 1941)
  - 48th Independent Company, Reconnaissance Corps (joined from 15th Battalion, Reconnaissance Corps 4 January 1942, redesignated 48th Independent Reconnaissance Squadron 6 June 1942; transferred to 80th (Reserve) Division 3 January 1943).

=== Postwar ===
The division was not reformed in the Territorial Army in 1947. In 1961 the division became a district headquarters as 48th (South Midland) Division/District, and it was disbanded on the reduction of the TA into the Territorial and Army Volunteer Reserve on 1 April 1967, when many individual TA units lost their identities. The district headquarters itself formed the core of the structure for the creation of West Midlands District under HQ UK Land Forces in 1972.

== General officer commanding ==
Commanders included:

Appointed	General officer commanding
April 1908	Brigadier-General Herbert Raitt
September 1911	Major-General Alexander Thorneycroft
1 July 1912	Major-General John Keir
27 July 1914	Major-General Edward Graham
5 August 1914	Major-General Henry Heath (sick, 7 May 1915)
7 May 1915	Brigadier-General W. K. McClintock (acting)
31 May 1915	Major-General Sir Robert Fanshawe
20 June 1918	Brigadier-General J Steele (acting)
4 July 1918	Major-General Sir Harold Walker
April 1923	Major-General Sir Percy Radcliffe
April 1926	Major-General Thomas Tait Pitman
April 1930	Major-General Ivo Vesey
June 1931	Major-General Cuthbert Fuller
June 1935	Major-General Stephen Butler
June 1939	Major-General Frank Crowther Roberts
8 October 1939	Brigadier Honorable Edward Lawson (acting)
23 October 1939	Major-General Andrew Thorne
7 June 1940	Brigadier James Muirhead (acting)
18 June 1940	Major-General Roderic Loraine Petre
8 October 1941	Major-General Arthur Grassett
14 November 1941	Brigadier James Muirhead (acting)
7 December 1941	Major-General Hayman Hayman-Joyce
29 August 1943	Brigadier Philip Bowden-Smith (acting)
3 September 1943	Brigadier William Leslie Dibben (acting)
6 September 1943	Major-General Horatio Berney-Ficklin
29 March 1944 (until 1946)	Major-General William Bradshaw
February 1961	Major-General John Worsley
March 1963	Major-General John Willoughby
April 1965 (until April 1967)	Major-General Peter Gillett

== See also ==
- Charles Carrington, a member of the division and subsequent author.
- Ronald Poulton-Palmer, captain of the England national rugby union team and a member of the division who was killed in 1915.

== Notes ==
Footnotes

Citations
