= Frank Crowther Roberts =

Army officer

Major-General Frank Crowther Roberts VC DSO OBE MC
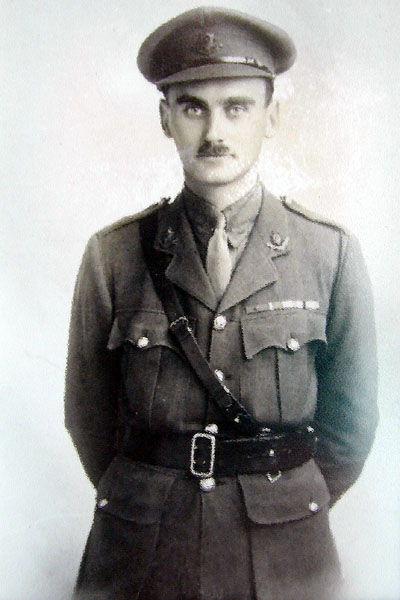
- Born: 2 June 1891; Highbury, London, England
- Died: 12 January 1982 (aged 90); Stanhope Bretby, Derbyshire, England
- Military career
- Allegiance: United Kingdom
- Branch: British Army
- Service years: 1911–1939
- Rank: Major-General
- Nickname: "Culley"
- Units: Worcestershire Regiment; Royal Warwickshire Regiment
- Commands: 48th (South Midland) Infantry Division (1939); Poona Brigade (1938–39); 1st Battalion, Royal Warwickshire Regiment (1937–38); 1st Battalion, Worcestershire Regiment (1917–18)
- Conflicts: First World War; Second World War
- Awards: Victoria Cross; Distinguished Service Order; Officer of the Order of the British Empire; Military Cross; Mentioned in Despatches (6)

Major-General Frank Crowther Roberts, VC, DSO, OBE, MC (2 June 1891 – 12 January 1982) was a British Army officer and an English recipient of the Victoria Cross (VC), the highest award for gallantry in the face of the enemy that can be awarded to British and Commonwealth forces.

== Early life ==
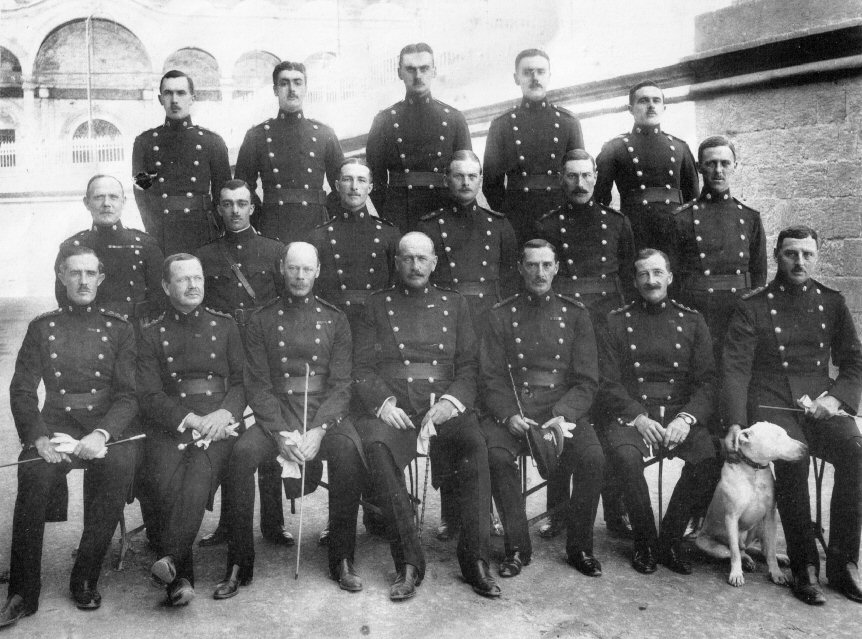
Officers of the 1st Battalion, Worcestershire Regiment, Egypt, 1914. Second Lieutenant Roberts is stood in the centre of the back row.

Frank Crowther Roberts was born on 2 June 1891 in Highbury, London, the son of Rev. Frank Roberts, vicar of St John's Church, Southall. He was educated at St Lawrence College, Ramsgate and the Royal Military College, Sandhurst, where he graduated and was subsequently commissioned as a second lieutenant into the Worcestershire Regiment on 4 March 1911. Roberts was soon posted to the 1st Battalion of his regiment and was sent, along with his battalion, to Alexandria, Egypt, in the following year, to relieve the 2nd Battalion, Worcesters. Roberts was still there upon the outbreak of the First World War in August 1914.

== First World War ==
Roberts, promoted to lieutenant on 3 September 1914, along with his battalion, then commanded by Lieutenant Colonel George Grogan, returned to the United Kingdom shortly after the declaration of war and arrived there in October 1914, where it became part of the 24th Brigade of the newly formed 8th Division, which was then in the process of formation. The battalion was sent to reinforce the British Expeditionary Force (BEF) on the Western Front and landed in France in November 1914.

The battalion was involved in the winter operations 1914–1915 and participated in the Christmas truce, although it is not known if Roberts himself took part. Just less than two months after his arrival in France, Roberts was already proving himself in action, which resulted in his being awarded the Distinguished Service Order (DSO) while leading a trench raid. He was made his battalion's adjutant and fought in the Battle of Neuve Chapelle, and was promoted to captain on 6 August 1915. He remained an adjutant until October 1916 when he was made a brigade major of the 8th Division's 23rd Brigade. In this capacity, during the Battle of Passchendaele (also known as the Third Battle of Ypres) in August 1917, Roberts was awarded the Military Cross (MC). His MC citation states the following:

For conspicuous gallantry and devotion to duty. During two days' very hard fighting he showed marked skill and resource under adverse circumstances, and throughout kept a firm grip of the situation. It was largely due to his excellent staff work that the brigade was able to hold its objectives against heavy counterattacks; and, in addition, the daring personal reconnaissances which he made under heavy fire were of the greatest value to headquarters throughout the whole action.

On 24 October 1917 he returned to the 1st Battalion, Worcesters and, aged just twenty-six, was promoted to the acting rank of lieutenant-colonel, and given temporary command of the battalion, becoming one of the British Army's youngest battalion commanders.

He was 26 years old, and an acting lieutenant-colonel in the 1st Battalion, Worcestershire Regiment, British Army during the First World War when the following deed took place for which he was awarded the VC. Lieutenant-Colonel Roberts showed exceptional military skill during the period 22 March – 2 April 1918, in the German spring offensive, west of the Somme and at the village of Pargny, France.

During continuous operations which covered over twelve days Lt-Col Roberts showed most conspicuous bravery, exceptional military skill in dealing with the many very difficult situations of the retirement, and amazing endurance and energy in encouraging and inspiring all ranks under his command.

On one occasion the enemy attacked a village and had practically cleared it of our troops, when this officer got together an improvised party and led a counter-attack which temporarily drove the enemy out of the village, thus covering the retirement of troops on their flanks who would otherwise have been cut off.

The success of this action was entirely due to his personal valour and skill.

Roberts was wounded on 27 March and returned to England for treatment, returning to his battalion on 17 June, where he again assumed command, leading the battalion during the Hundred Days Offensive until the armistice of 11 November 1918. During the First World War, Roberts was wounded three times and mentioned in despatches six times.

== Between the wars ==
He remained in the army during the interwar period, reverting to his permanent rank of captain and serving briefly with the Egyptian Army in the Sudan from 16 February 1919. Returning to England, Roberts attended the Staff College, Camberley, entering in January 1921, shortly afterwards being made an Officer of the Order of the British Empire (OBE), and graduating in December 1922. Among his many fellow students there were Eric Costin, James Gammell, John Priestman, Edward Alban, Merton Beckwith-Smith, Russell Gurney, Francis Nosworthy, Giffard Martel, John Kennedy, Ridley Pakenham-Walsh, Ralph Eastwood, Edwin Morris, Eric Miles, Robert Naylor, Thomas Corbett, Ernest Squires, Austin Miller, William Baker and Edmund Osborne, all of whom would, like Roberts, become general officers. He later served in Egypt in 1923–24 and with the British Army of the Rhine (BAOR). He transferred to the Royal Warwickshire Regiment as a major in July 1927 and served with the regiment's 2nd Battalion in India and the Middle East. His next appointment was as a General Staff Officer Grade 3 (GSO3) with the Iraqi Army and, for his service in Southern Kurdistan, was promoted to brevet lieutenant-colonel.

He married Winifred Margaret Wragg at Bretby, Derbyshire on 23 April 1932; she was the sister of Herbert Wragg MP.

He was made a brevet colonel in 1932 and promoted to lieutenant-colonel on 24 November 1936. In January 1935 he served as a GSO2 with Northern Ireland District. In 1937 Roberts became CO of the 1st Battalion, Royal Warwickshires and went with the battalion to India. The following year he became commander of the Poona Brigade of the Indian Army, an unusual posting for an officer of the British Army but a clear sign that his star was on the rise, and was granted the local rank of brigadier from 9 April 1937 until 8 November 1937, before reverting to colonel, when he relinquished command. Returning to England, he was promoted to the rank of major-general on 1 June 1939 (with seniority backdated to 13 June 1939), three months before the outbreak of the Second World War, and became General Officer Commanding (GOC) of the 48th (South Midland) Infantry Division, a Territorial Army (TA) formation. Aged just 48, he was one of the youngest divisional commanders in the British Army, only Major-General The Hon. Harold Alexander, GOC of the 1st Infantry Division, and Major-General William Holmes, GOC of the 42nd (East Lancashire) Infantry Division, being younger.

== Second World War and retirement ==
The 48th Division – comprising the 143rd, 144th and 145th Infantry Brigades along with supporting units – being a first-line TA formation, was poorly trained and equipped, lacking in modern weapons and equipment, had to be rapidly trained to Regular standards in order to join the British Expeditionary Force (BEF) serving in France. However, in October, Roberts handed over command of the division to Major-General Andrew Thorne and retired from the army on 16 December 1939, three months after the outbreak of the war, after twenty-eight years of military service.

Roberts and his wife, who died 22 December 1980, settled in Stanhope Bretby, Derbyshire. Having no children, he remained there until his death on 12 January 1982 at the age of 90. He was cremated at Bretby crematorium and his ashes buried in his wife's family grave in St Wystan's churchyard, Bretby.

His VC is displayed at the Worcestershire Regimental Collection in the Worcester City Art Gallery & Museum, Worcester, England.

== Bibliography ==
- Gliddon, Gerald (2013). Spring Offensive 1918. VCs of the First World War. Stroud: History Press. ISBN 978-0-7524-8730-4.
- Smart, Nick (2005). Biographical Dictionary of British Generals of the Second World War. Barnesley: Pen and Sword Books. ISBN 1844150496.

Military offices
| Preceded by Stephen Butler | GOC 48th (South Midland) Infantry Division; June–October 1939 | Succeeded by Andrew Thorne |
