= 108th Regiment Royal Armoured Corps =

108th Regiment Royal Armoured Corps (Lancashire Fusiliers)
- Active: 1941–1943
- Disbanded: 1943
- Country: United Kingdom
- Branch: British Army
- Type: Armoured Regiment
- Role: Cruiser tank Infantry Support; Training
- Part of: Royal Armoured Corps
- Anniversaries: Gallipoli Day (25 April); Minden Day (1 August)
- Equipment: Cruiser Mk I Cruiser Mk II; Cruiser Mk IIa; Covenanter; Crusader; Valentine; Churchill; Sherman V

108 Regiment Royal Armoured Corps (The Lancashire Fusiliers) (108 RAC) was an armoured regiment of the British Army's Royal Armoured Corps during World War II.

== Origin and traditions ==
108 Regiment RAC was formed at Barnard Castle on 1 November 1941 by the conversion to the armoured role of 1/5th (Bury) Battalion of the Lancashire Fusiliers, a 1st Line Territorial Army infantry battalion. 1/5th Battalion had been serving in 125th Infantry Brigade of 42nd (East Lancashire) Infantry Division, which were redesignated 10th Armoured Brigade and 42nd Armoured Division respectively. All three regiments in the brigade were drawn from the Lancashire Fusiliers and underwent simultaneous conversion (the other two became 109 RAC and 143 RAC).

The regiment was intensely proud of its Lancashire Fusiliers heritage, and always included the name in its RAC designation. Soon after its conversion, the 108th's officers were ordered to wear the black beret of the RAC with their battledress uniform; but in common with other infantry units transferred to the Royal Armoured Corps, personnel would have continued to wear their Lancashire Fusiliers cap badge on the beret. 108 RAC also continued the Lancashire Fusiliers' commemoration of Gallipoli Day (25 April) and Minden Day (1 August). Minden Day was celebrated by Trooping the Colour, a drum-head service, and regimental sports, followed by the officers visiting the men at dinner.

== Training ==
In January and February 1942 the regiment began to receive its first Covenanter tanks, some "in extremely poor condition". In May 1942, 10th Armoured Brigade was converted into 10th Tank Brigade. This meant that its role was changed from Cruiser to Infantry tanks, and 108 RAC began to receive Valentines and Churchills in place of Covenanters, which were passed on to the newly formed 1st Polish Armoured Division. The brigade also moved to the 'Dukeries' area of Nottinghamshire where RAC infantry tank training was carried out: 108 RAC moved to Rufford Abbey in June 1942.

In October 1942, 10th Tank Brigade was attached to 48th (South Midland) Division, a Reserve infantry division tasked with holding and training reinforcements. In December the Brigade and its regiments were given the role of producing drafts for RAC units serving overseas. Consequently, in January 1943 108 RAC reorganised into three training wings:

- Wireless
- Gunnery
- Driving and Maintenance

The regiment now held a very mixed collection of tanks, including Cruiser Mk I, Cruiser Mk II, Cruiser Mk IIa, Cruiser Mk III, Cruiser Mk IV, and Covenanters, Valentine and Churchill infantry tanks, and later some Sherman Vs. Throughout 1943, men were posted into the regiment from RAC training regiments, and posted out to drafts for overseas service.

== Disbandment ==
In August 1943, rumours began to circulate that 10th Tank Brigade was scheduled for disbandment. Members of Parliament for the Lancashire towns complained about the possible loss of their TA battalions, and a recruiting team arrived to persuaded men to volunteer for the Parachute Regiment if the brigade disbanded. Although 10th Tank Brigade moved to Wensleydale in September, with 108 RAC at Wensley village, the impending disbandment was confirmed shortly afterwards.

On 22 November the final announcement was received that 108 RAC would be disbanded by the end of the year, and 1/5th Lancashire Fusiliers would go into a state of suspended animation. Some officers were sent for retraining as infantry officers, but most of the officers and other ranks were posted to other RAC units or training regiments, with a few wireless operators transferring to the Royal Corps of Signals and gunners to the Royal Artillery.

Postwar, 5th Battalion, Lancashire Fusiliers was reconstituted in the Territorial Army 1947.

== External sources ==
- Land Forces of Britain, the Empire and Commonwealth
