= Stephen Butler (British Army officer) =

British Army general

Major-General Stephen Butler CB CMG DSO
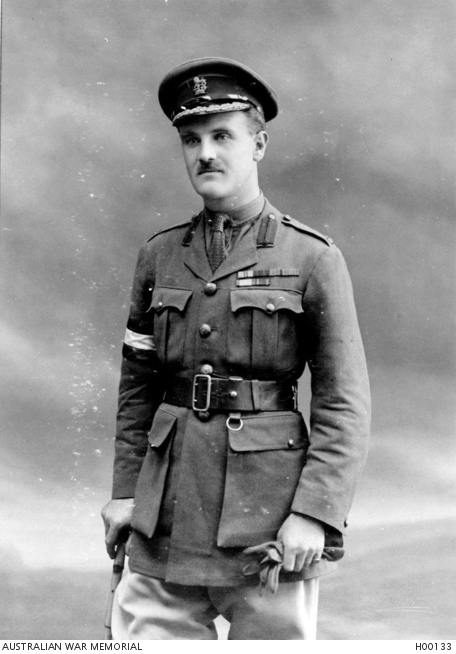
- Butler as a major, likely in the 1910s
- Born: 6 October 1880; Berkhamsted
- Died: 16 July 1964 (aged 83); Southampton
- Military career
- Allegiance: United Kingdom
- Branch: British Army
- Service years: 1897–1939; 1939–1940
- Rank: Major-General
- Units: Northumberland Fusiliers; Royal Warwickshire Regiment; South Staffordshire Regiment
- Commands: 48th (South Midland) Infantry Division
- Conflicts: Second Boer War; First World War; Second World War

Major-General Stephen Seymour Butler, CB, CMG, DSO (6 October 1880 – 16 July 1964) was a senior officer in the British Army.

== Early life and family ==
Stephen Seymour Butler was born on 6 October 1880, the son of Rev. George Hew Butler (died 1929) and Florence (nee Measor) . His father was the son of Colonel Thomas Butler, of Bury Lodge in Hambledon, Hampshire, and was educated at Trinity Hall, Cambridge (BA 1870, MA 1874); ordained a priest in 1872, after serving in several curacies, he was successively the Vicar of Herriard (1882–87), Wood Dalling (1888–96), and Gazeley with Kentford (1897–1914). In 1913, Stephen Butler married Phyllis (died 1964), daughter of Captain Harold Septimus Basil Critchley-Salmonson (died 1942). They had two sons: Patrick Butler and Major-General Hew Dacres George Butler, CB (1922–2007).

== Military career ==
Butler joined the 3rd (Militia) Battalion of the Northumberland Fusiliers (later the Royal Northumberland Fusiliers) in 1897. He was commissioned into the Royal Warwickshire Regiment, and the Regular Army, as a second lieutenant on 20 May 1899.

He was promoted to the rank of lieutenant on 1 April 1900 and fought in the Second Boer War of 1899–1901 from where he was invalided with malaria and typhoid having taken part in the advance to Pretoria and operations in the Koomati Valley.

He served with the King's African Rifles between August 1905 and April 1908, during which time he was posted in East Africa (1906) and explored northern Arabia disguised as a Bedouin and drew up the first map of the route from Baghdad to Damascus. When he returned he transferred to the South Staffordshire Regiment, before being employed with the Egyptian Army between April 1909 and May 1915, he was promoted from supernumerary captain to captain on 14 June 1908 and involved in operations in Southern Kordofan in Sudan in 1910.

During World War I, Butler served with the Egyptian Expeditionary Force (EEF) from November 1914 until May 1915, when he was posted to Gallipoli as a GSO3. He was promoted on 1 September 1915 to major and served as a general staff officer, grade 2 (GSO2) from October 1915 onwards, taking over from Cyril Wagstaff. In January 1916, he returned to serve with the EEF for two months, before being transferred with the ANZAC Corps to France and Belgium in March 1916; he remained there until the end of the War (11 November 1918). He was wounded and mentioned in despatches four times; he received the Distinguished Service Order, the French Croix de Guerre and the Order of the Sacred Treasure (3rd Class), and was appointed a Commander of the Order of St Michael and St George. Butler was also promoted to the rank of Major on 12 August 1915 and made a brevet lieutenant colonel in June 1918; he served as a General staff Officer for much of the war, beginning with an appointment in the 3rd Division in the Mediterranean Expeditionary Force (May to October 1915) as GSO2 on the staff of General William Birdwood who commanded the ANZAC Corps. After several months in the 2nd division with the MEF, he was posted to an equivalent position in France in February 1916, which lasted until January 1918, when he was promoted to the 1st Division; he remained there until March 1919.

From June 1919 to August 1920, Butler was a General Staff Officer in Constantinople. In October 1920, he was appointed Assistant Military Secretary to the General Officer Commanding the Northern Command in India and served in Waziristan. He was promoted to substantive lieutenant colonel on 2 January 1921. He relinquished his post on 12 August 1923 and was placed on half-pay. He was posted as a military attaché in Bucharest the following month, serving until April 1926. Promotion to colonel followed in November 1925, with seniority from June 1922. On 1 October 1926 he was appointed an inspector general of the West African Frontier Force (later the Royal West African Frontier Force), and for which he was granted the temporary rank of colonel on the staff whilst so employed.

On 28 March 1930 was appointed a Brigadier Commanding Troops and Commandant in the Sudan Defence Force with the rank of temporary brigadier up to 16 July 1934, when he was promoted to Major-General. He then command the 48th (South Midland) Division of the Territorial Army (TA) between 1935 and 1939, and was appointed a Companion of the Order of the Bath in 1936.

Butler retired in 1939, but was re-employed on the outbreak of World War II. He was Head of the Military Mission to Turkey between 1939 and 1940 and liaison in Africa (1940–41), before serving as Head of the Military Mission to Ethiopia until 1943. He died on 16 July 1964 and his home in Hambledon, Hampshire.

== Bibliography ==
- Smart, Nick (2005). Biographical Dictionary of British Generals of the Second World War. Barnesley: Pen and Sword Books. ISBN 1844150496.

Military offices
Preceded by Cuthbert Fuller	GOC 48th (South Midland) Infantry Division; 1935–1939	Succeeded by Frank Roberts
