= 125th (Lancashire Fusiliers) Brigade =

Lancashire Fusiliers Brigade 125th (Lancashire Fusiliers) Brigade 125th Infantry Brigade
- Active: 1908–1919; 1920–1941
- Country: United Kingdom
- Branch: Territorial Army
- Type: Infantry
- Size: Brigade
- Part of: 42nd (East Lancashire) Infantry Division
- Anniversaries: Gallipoli: 25 April
- Engagements: First World War: Gallipoli Campaign; Battle of Romani; Battle of Passchendaele; Battles of the Somme (1918); Hundred Days Offensive (1918); Second World War: Battle of Belgium; Battle of France; Dunkirk evacuation

Commanders
- Notable commanders: Leonard Green; The O'Donovan; Philip Bowden-Smith

Insignia
- Identification symbol: 42nd Division insignia, Second World War

British 42nd (East Lancashire) Division Insignia

The 125th (Lancashire Fusiliers) Brigade was an infantry brigade formation of the British Army that saw active service during both the First and Second World Wars. It was assigned to the 42nd (East Lancashire) Division and served in the Middle East and later in the trenches of the Western Front in the First World War. In the Second World War the brigade, now redesignated 125th Infantry Brigade, fought in Belgium and France before being evacuated at Dunkirk and was then converted into 10th Armoured Brigade.

Throughout its existence the brigade was composed almost entirely of battalions of the Lancashire Fusiliers, except for a few brief months in the early half of the Second World War.

== Formation ==
Upon the creation of the Territorial Force in April 1908, the four Volunteer battalions attached to the Lancashire Fusiliers were organised into a brigade within the East Lancashire Division. The battalions were drawn from the Lancashire towns of Bury (5th Battalion), Rochdale (6th Battalion) and Salford (7th and 8th battalions), with Brigade HQ at Preston.

== First World War ==
On the outbreak of the First World War, the East Lancashire Division mobilised and was sent to Egypt to relieve Regular Army troops of the British Army. Those men who had not volunteered for overseas service were left behind, together with floods of recruits, to form 2nd Line battalions (2/5th–2/8th Lancashire Fusiliers) in a 2nd East Lancashire Division. The 1st Line battalions were then renumbered 1/5th–1/8th. On 26 May 1915 the East Lancashire Division was renamed 42nd (East Lancashire) Division, and the Lancashire Fusilier Brigade was numbered 125th (Lancashire Fusiliers) Brigade. (In August 1915 the 2nd Line brigade became 197th (2/1st Lancashire Fusiliers) Brigade in 66th (2nd East Lancashire) Division.)

=== Order of battle ===
The 125th Brigade was constituted as follows during the war: Brigadier-General C.H. Frith
Brigadier-General H. Fargus from 23 June 1917

- 1/5th Battalion, Lancashire Fusiliers (from Bury)
- 1/6th Battalion, Lancashire Fusiliers (from Rochdale) (left 19 February 1918)
- 1/7th Battalion, Lancashire Fusiliers (from Salford)
- 1/8th Battalion, Lancashire Fusiliers (from Salford)
- 125th Machine Gun Company, Machine Gun Corps (formed 4 March 1916, moved to 42nd Battalion, Machine Gun Corps 25 February 1918)
- 125th Trench Mortar Battery (joined 26 March 1917)

When British infantry brigades on the Western Front were reduced to three battalions in February 1918, 1/6th Battalion, Lancashire Fusiliers left and joined 197th (2/1st Lancashire Fusiliers) Brigade of the 66th (2nd East Lancashire) Division, where it merged with the 2/6th Battalion, Lancashire Fusiliers and became the 6th Battalion once again.

=== Gallipoli ===
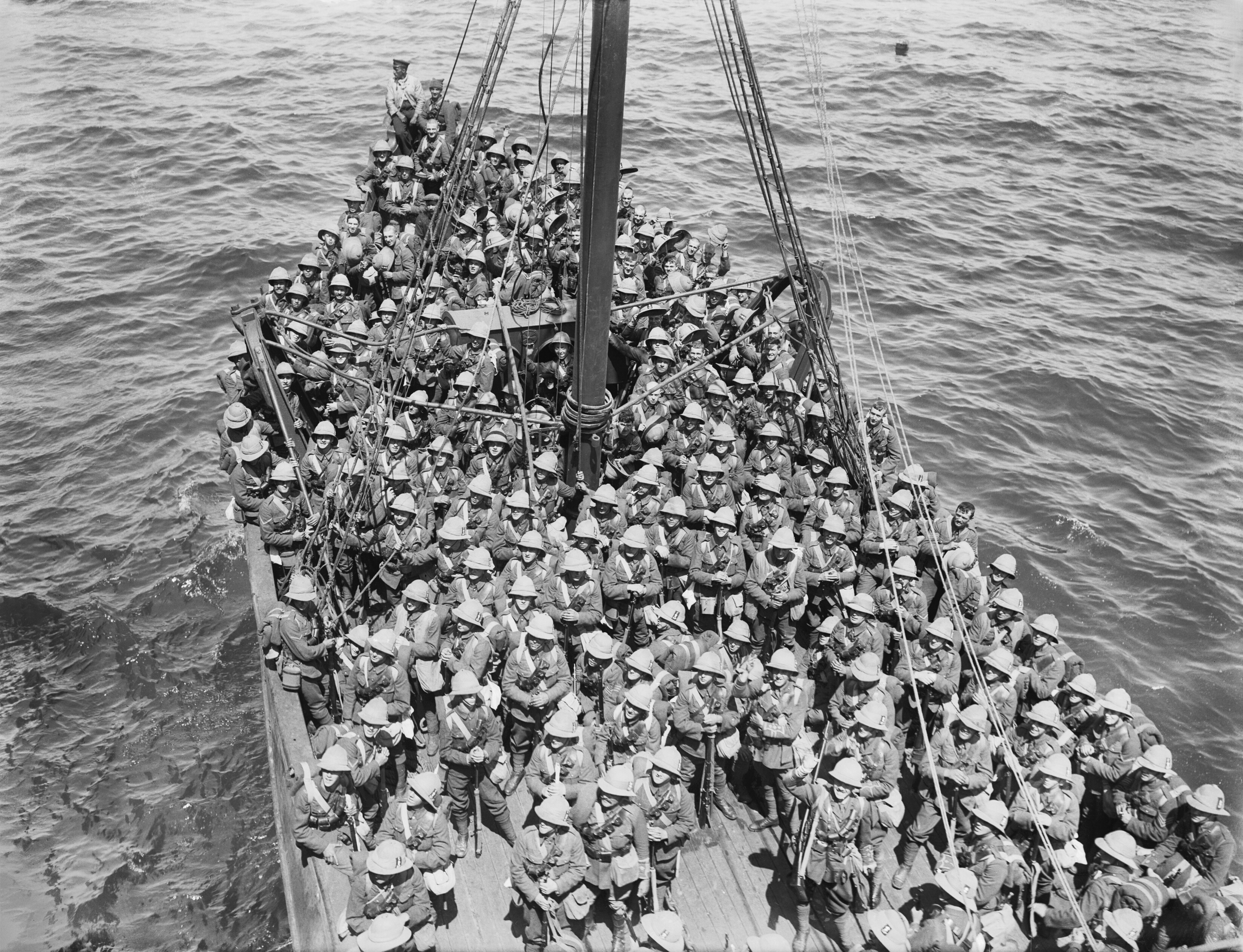
A boat carrying men of 125th (Lancashire Fusiliers) Brigade ashore at Cape Helles, May 1915. Photo by Ernest Brooks

In early May 1915, the 42nd Division embarked from Alexandria for Cape Helles on the Gallipoli Peninsula, where Allied troops had landed a few days earlier. 125th Brigade was the first part of the division to go into action, at the Second Battle of Krithia under the command of the Regular 29th Division. It then reverted to 42nd Division, and took part in the Third Battle of Krithia and Battle of Krithia Vineyard. The fighting was "a singularly brainless and suicidal type of warfare", and virtually nothing was achieved in any of these attacks, at the cost of heavy casualties. Two brigades (the other being 126th (1/1st East Lancashire) Brigade) of 42nd Division attacked on the second day of the Krithia Vineyard battle: 'By nightfall both brigades were back in their old lines, with the exception of some parties of the 6th and 7th Lancashire Fusiliers, who defended the Vineyard against repeated Turkish attacks until, after a bitter and pointless struggle during the following five days, a trench dug across the centre of this worthless tract of scrub became the British front line'. After this failure, the Helles front was shut down and no further attacks were made. Five months later, following repeated failures elsewhere, the whole Gallipoli Campaign ended in evacuation back to Egypt.

=== Recuperation ===
The 42nd Division returned to Egypt in January 1916 with less than half the strength with which it had set out. It was stationed in Egypt for the next year, defending the Suez Canal and taking part in the Battle of Romani (4–5 August).

=== Western Front ===
In February and March 1917, the whole of 42nd Division moved from Egypt to France to reinforce the British Expeditionary Force (BEF) on the Western Front, where it remained for the rest of the war. After re-equipping and training for trench warfare in a "quiet sector" with Fourth Army, 42nd Division relieved 15th (Scottish) Division in Fifth Army in the Ypres Sector at the end of August. On 6 September 125th Brigade carried out an unsuccessful attack on strongly-held German pillboxes around Iberian, Borry, and Beck House Farms. The small amount of ground they took was given up the next day.

The 42nd Division was then returned to holding quiet sectors, at Nieuport and then Givenchy. It was now part of IV Corps in Third Army, in which it remained for the rest of the war. During the German Army's Spring Offensive (Operation Michael or the First Battles of the Somme 1918), the troops of 42nd Division took part in the Battle of Bapaume (24–25 March), First Battle of Arras (28 March) and the Battle of Ancre (5 April). Then, during the Allied Hundred Days Offensive, it participated in the Battle of Albert (21–23 August) where Lance Corporal Edward Smith of the 1/5th Battalion, Lancashire Fusiliers was awarded the Victoria Cross. The brigade later fought in the Second Battle of Bapaume (31 August–3 September) during the fighting on the Somme. On the Hindenburg Line it was in the Battle of the Canal du Nord, where the Official History records that 125th Brigade's advance at 07.52 on 27 September 'was met by very heavy fire in front from machine guns which the barrage did not seem to have touched, and from Beaucamp on the right ... It reached an intermediate objective about five hundred yards from the front line and towards noon a little beyond this; but there it had to remain'. However IV Corps renewed the attack after dark: 'The night was very dark and rainy, but the attack was a complete success; the enemy was surprised; very little opposition was encountered and many prisoners were taken. Under barrages moving a hundred yards in 5 minutes, the front lines of the 125th and 127th Brigades of the 42nd Division ... went forward in succession'. 42nd Division resumed the attack the following afternoon (28 September), 'when the 125th and 126th brigades (the latter passing through the 127th), after some opposition, reached the top of Welsh Ridge, the objective of the division'.

Third Army's advance in Picardy culminated in the Battle of the Selle from 17 to 23 October. On 23 October 42nd Division was given the task of taking three successive objectives before the New Zealand Division passed through to continue the attack. 125th Brigade led the attack with two battalions in front, but in spite of a defensive smoke barrage they suffered considerably from enemy shelling during assembly. The defenders of Beaurain "made a stout resistance and there was hard fighting in the early stages of the attack, men on both sides being killed by the bayonet". The left of 125th Brigade reached its objective by 04.45, but the rest of the line did not do so until 08.00. The New Zealanders passed through and successfully reached their objectives.

The division was then withdrawn into reserve and halted around Beauvois-en-Cambrésis from 24 October until the advance was resumed on 3 November. On 7 November the 42nd Division was tasked to take the high ground west of Hautmont and if possible to capture the town. The division was held up by enfilade fire from the right, and 126th Brigade did no more than occupy some of the high ground. 125th Brigade was therefore ordered to pass through it the next morning and advance to the objective. But the 126th, 'in an endeavour to atone for its slowness on the 7th', pushed on and reached Hautmont before 125th could catch up. The 125th was unable to cross the Sambre because the pontoons had not arrived, so it retraced its steps to its overnight billets near Pont sur Sambre and crossed there. The brigade then forced back the enemy rearguards, and after dark its patrols went forward and cleared them off the high ground near Fort d'Hautmont, one of the outer forts of the Fortress of Maubeuge. On 9 November the brigade encountered no resistance in reaching its assigned objective, and by 10 November the most forward troops were on the Maubeuge–Avesnes-sur-Helpe road. This was the end of the fighting, because the Armistice with Germany came into the effect the following day. In December the division moved into quarters in the Charleroi area and by mid-March 1919 most of its troops had gone home for demobilisation.

== Interwar years ==
The Territorial Force was disbanded after the Great War and so both the brigade and division were also disbanded. However, the division reformed in 1920 in the Territorial Army, which was formed on a similar basis as the Territorial Force. The brigade was also reformed, now as the 125th (Lancashire Fusiliers) Infantry Brigade, again with all four Territorial battalions of the Lancashire Fusiliers.

Unlike the other infantry brigades in the division, the 125th Brigade's organisation remained much the same. However, in the late 1930s the Territorial Army's infantry was reorganised and, with a reduced need for so many infantry units, many of them were converted into other roles, mainly anti-aircraft or searchlight units, of either the Royal Artillery or Royal Engineers. As a result, the 7th Battalion, Lancashire Fusiliers was transferred to the Royal Engineers and converted into the 39th (The Lancashire Fusiliers) Anti-Aircraft Battalion, Royal Engineers, equipped with searchlights, and joined the 33rd (Western) Anti-Aircraft Group, 2nd Anti-Aircraft Division. It appears they were not replaced in the brigade. Shortly after, in 1939, the brigade was redesignated the 125th Infantry Brigade.

== Second World War ==
The brigade and division, and the rest of the Territorial Army, were mobilised on 1 September 1939, the day the German Army launched its invasion of Poland. The Second World War officially began two days later, on 3 September 1939, and the men of the brigade and division were called up for full-time war service. Once again the 125th Infantry Brigade was composed of three battalions of the Lancashire Fusiliers. Both the brigade and division immediately began training in preparation for eventual overseas service.

=== France and Dunkirk ===
The 125th Brigade, commanded at the time by Brigadier George Sutton a Territorial officer, landed in France on 15 April 1940 with the rest of the 42nd Division and became part of the British Expeditionary Force (BEF). The division came under command of III Corps, under Lieutenant-General Sir Ronald Adam, which also included the Regular 5th Infantry Division and Territorial 44th (Home Counties) Infantry Division. Both the 42nd and 44th Divisions had, before deployment to France, been held back from reinforcing the BEF in order to participate in potential operations in Northern Europe, although this had never came to fruition. In early May the 1/8th Battalion, Lancashire Fusiliers was exchanged with the 1st Battalion, Border Regiment from 4th Infantry Brigade, 2nd Infantry Division, another Regular formation. This was part of the BEF's official policy of mixing the Regular and Territorial Armies and was intended to, in theory, strengthen the TA divisions.

After the defeat at the hands of the German Army during the Battle of France, the brigade, after sustaining very heavy casualties, was evacuated from Dunkirk on 30 May 1940. With the 42nd Division, the brigade would spend most of its time in the United Kingdom reforming and absorbing large numbers of men who had been conscripted into military service as replacements, on home defence and training to repel an expected German invasion. In December, the 1st Battalion, Border Regiment was transferred to 31st Independent Infantry Brigade and was replaced by 9th Battalion, Lancashire Fusiliers, a newly raised hostilities-only unit created only a few months before in June.

=== Conversion ===
On 1 November 1941, 42nd Division was converted to 42nd Armoured Division, and 125th Brigade was renamed 10th Armoured Brigade. 1/5th, 1/6th and 9th Lancashire Fusiliers (a war service battalion raised in June 1940) became respectively the 108th, 109th and 143rd regiments of the Royal Armoured Corps. Like all infantry units transferred to the Royal Armoured Corps, they still maintained their infantry cap badges on the black beret of the Royal Armoured Corps.

When the 10th Armoured Brigade was scheduled for disbandment in late 1943, Members of Parliament for the Lancashire towns complained about the loss of their Territorial battalions. Nevertheless, the disbandment went ahead in November 1943. Of the battalions, only the 5th Battalion, Lancashire Fusiliers was reconstituted after the war.

=== Order of battle ===
The 125th Infantry Brigade was constituted as follows during the war:

- 1/5th Battalion, Lancashire Fusiliers
- 1/6th Battalion, Lancashire Fusiliers
- 1/8th Battalion, Lancashire Fusiliers (left 4 May 1940, to 4th Brigade)
- 125th Infantry Brigade Anti-Tank Company (formed 31 December 1939, disbanded 25 January 1941)
- 1st Battalion, Border Regiment (from 4th Brigade 4 May 1940, moved to 31st Brigade 1 December 1940)
- 9th Battalion, Lancashire Fusiliers (newly raised; joined 1 December 1940)

=== Commanders ===
The following officers commanded 125th Infantry Brigade during the war:

- Brigadier G.W. Sutton (until 10 October 1940)
- Brigadier The O'Donovan (from 10 October 1940 until 16 August 1941)
- Lieutenant Colonel J.K. Smith (Acting, from 17 August until 6 September 1941)
- Brigadier P.E. Bowden-Smith (from 6 September 1941)

== Recipients of the Victoria Cross ==
- Lance Sergeant Edward Smith - 1/5th Battalion, Lancashire Fusiliers, First World War

== External sources ==
- The Long, Long Trail
- The Regimental Warpath 1914–1918
- Land Forces of Britain, the Empire and Commonwealth
