= Near East Command =

Near East Command was a Command of the British Armed Forces. It was only active from 1961 to 1962, but its subordinate Near East Land Forces was active from 1961 to as late as 1977.

== History ==
In 1959 Middle East Command was divided into two commands split by the Suez Canal.

The two parts were British Forces Arabian Peninsula, which was based at Aden, and the rump of Middle East Command which was based in Cyprus and which on 1 March 1961 was renamed Near East Command. It was formed as an interservice command with HQ at Episkopi, Cyprus, from Mediterranean elements of Middle East Command, while most of the latter's assets moved with its headquarters to Aden. The army element was Near East Land Forces.

Near East Land Forces comprised Cyprus District, British Troops Malta, Libya and Tripolitania Area, and Cyrenaica Area.

Near East Command itself was disbanded in 1962.

Near East Land Forces remained, with its headquarters in Cyprus, and was reorganised into districts: Cyprus District, Malta District, Libya and Tripolitania District and Cyrenaica District in August 1965. In 1969 the Libyan districts were disbanded as British and American forces left Libya. In Libya an Army port complex and RAF El Adem were closed in the late 1960s.

Hew Butler was General Officer Commanding Near East Land Forces from 1972 to 1974.

In April 1978 3 Signal Group in Cyprus was replaced by Signal Branch HQ Near East Land Forces.

Later the Malta District disbanded, and after that Near East Land Forces disbanded, leaving British Forces Cyprus as an independent command in 1977.

== Near East Land Forces signals support ==
NELF had a signals group located in Cyprus. 3rd Signal Group (Near East Land Forces) was active from 1967 to 1978. Created from Headquarters, Royal Signals Cyprus in 1967 to form 3rd Signal Group (Cyprus), it was renamed Headquarters, 3rd Signal Group (Near East Land Forces) in 1970 and was disbanded eight years later.

In 1967 the Headquarters, Royal Signals Cyprus became the Headquarters, 3 Signal Group (Cyprus). When it was first formed it only contained one signal regiment commanding three squadrons, as well as three separate squadrons. In 1970 it became the Headquarters, 3 Signal Group (Near East Land Forces). In 1976 it moved from Episkopeio to Dhekelia and was disbanded officially two years later in 1978. After its disbandment the group was replaced by Headquarters, Signals Branch, Near East Land Forces.

The following was the structure of the group on formation in 1967:

- 9th (Radio) Regiment Royal Signals
  - 234 Signal Squadron
  - 235 Signal Squadron
  - 236 Signal Squadron
- 259 (Radio Relay) Signal Squadron
- 261 (Air Formation) Signal Squadron
- 262 (Cyprus) Signal Squadron

== Commanders-in-Chief ==
General Sir Dudley Ward left the post of Commander-in-Chief British Army of the Rhine to become, in May 1960, Commander-in-Chief, British Forces Middle East. By the time Ward vacated the appointment in May 1962 his title was Commander-in-Chief, Near East.
