= Dudley Johnson (British Army officer) =

Recipient of the Victoria Cross

Major-General Dudley Johnson VC CB DSO & Bar MC
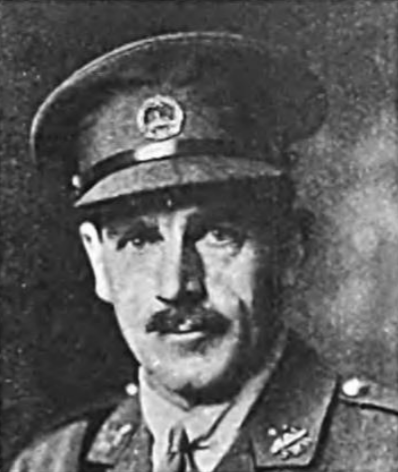
- Johnson in c. 1924
- Born: 13 February 1884; Bourton-on-the-Water, Gloucestershire, England
- Died: 21 December 1975 (aged 91); Fleet, Hampshire, England
- Burial place: Christ Church Churchyard, Church Crookham, Fleet, Hampshire, England
- Military career
- Allegiance: United Kingdom
- Branch: British Army
- Service years: 1901–1944
- Rank: Major-General
- Service number: 14089
- Units: Wiltshire Regiment; South Wales Borderers; North Staffordshire Regiment
- Commands: Aldershot Command (1940–41); 4th Infantry Division (1938–1940); Small Arms School Corps (1936–1938); 12th Indian Infantry Brigade (1933–1936); 2nd Battalion, North Staffordshire Regiment (1928–1932); 2nd Battalion, Royal Sussex Regiment (1918–1919)
- Conflicts: Second Boer War; First World War; Second World War
- Awards: Victoria Cross; Companion of the Order of the Bath; Distinguished Service Order & Bar; Military Cross; Mentioned in Despatches

Major-General Dudley Graham Johnson, VC, CB, DSO & Bar, MC (13 February 1884 – 21 December 1975) was a British Army officer and recipient of the Victoria Cross, the highest award for gallantry in the face of the enemy that can be awarded to British and Commonwealth forces.

== Military career ==
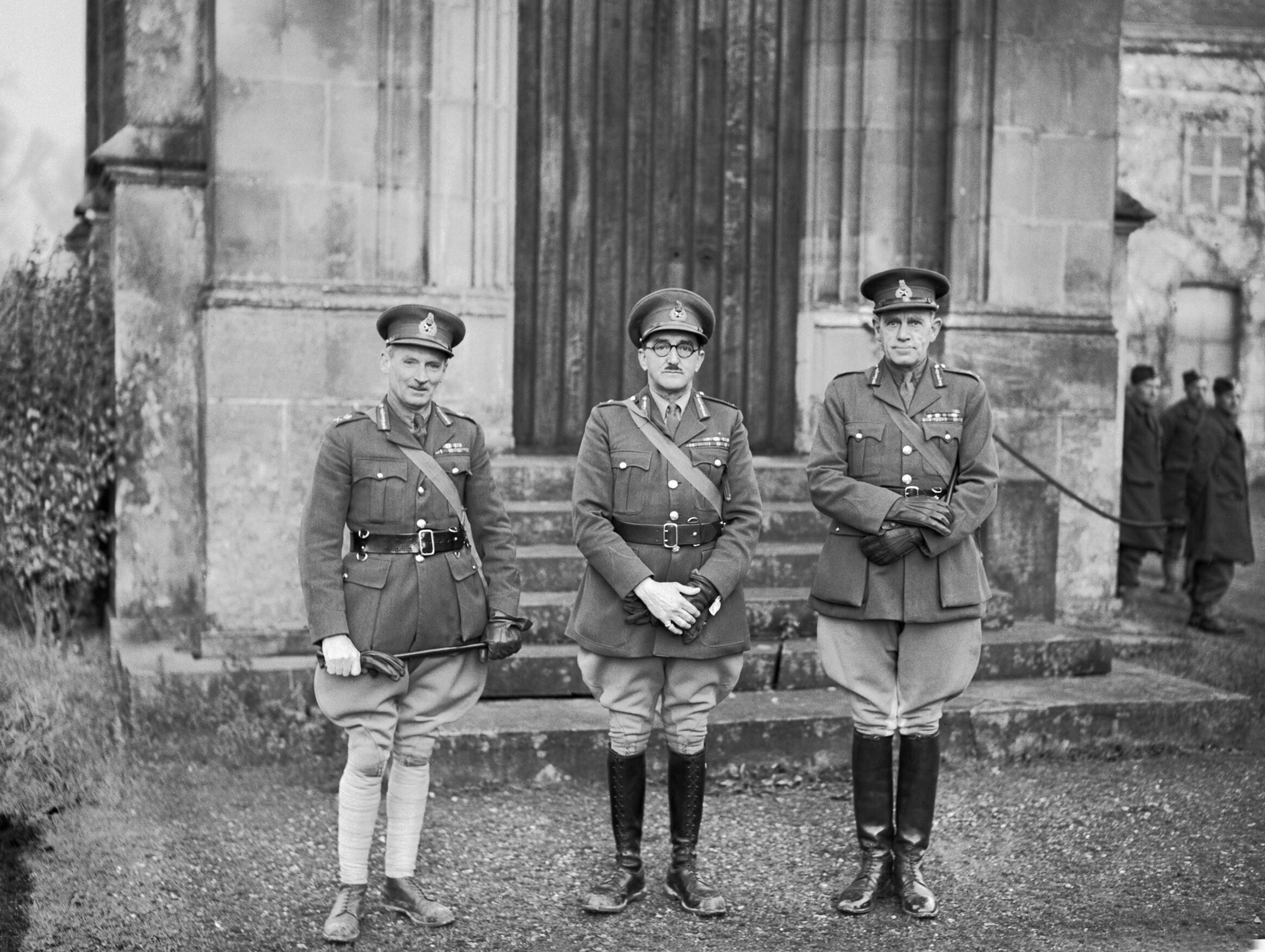
Major-General Bernard Montgomery (left), Lieutenant-General Sir Alan Brooke (centre), and Major-General Dudley Johnson (right) in France, c.1939–40.

Johnson served with the Wiltshire Regiment in the Second Boer War. He transferred to the South Wales Borderers upon graduating from the Royal Military College, Sandhurst in 1903. He went to serve in the First World War, earning the Distinguished Service Order in 1915 for bravery in late 1914, with the citation reading:

For conspicuous ability on the night of 5th-6th November, 1914, during the operations against the German positions at Tsing-tau, and for great gallantry in rescuing several wounded men whilst exposed to heavy machine-gun fire.

Johnson was later awarded a bar to his DSO towards the end of the war, with the citation for the bar stating:

For conspicuous gallantry and devotion to duty in command of his battalion in the attack. The ground over which his battalion advanced was very difficult, but thanks to his careful dispositions, was successfully negotiated. He personally superintended the reorganisation after the objective was reached, and subsequently carried out a night attack, advancing some thousand yards in the face of strenuous opposition. His skilful arrangements and conduct throughout inspired the men under him with a splendid fighting spirit.

He was 34 years old, and an acting lieutenant-colonel in the South Wales Borderers, British Army, commanding the 2nd Battalion, Royal Sussex Regiment when the following deed took place at the Sambre Canal, France for which he was awarded the VC.

On 4 November 1918 at Sambre Canal, France, the 2nd Infantry Brigade, of which the 2nd Battalion, The Royal Sussex Regiment formed part, was ordered to cross by the lock south of Catillon. The position was strong and the assaulting and bridging parties were halted on arrival at the waterway 100 yards from the canal by a heavy barrage. At this point Lieutenant-Colonel Johnson arrived and personally led an assault but heavy fire again broke up the attack. He reorganized the assaulting and bridging parties and this time effected a crossing but the success of this dangerous operation was entirely due to his splendid leadership.

Between the wars he attended the Staff College, Camberley from 1923 to 1924 and held a number of instruction and staff posts before being appointed commanding officer of the 2nd Battalion, North Staffordshire Regiment in 1928. He was promoted to colonel on 12 April 1932, with seniority backdated to 29 December 1927. He commanded the 12th (Secunderabad) Infantry Brigade in 1933, was promoted to the temporary rank of brigadier on 1 July 1933 while employed in this role, and on 7 January 1938 was promoted to major general and became general officer commanding (GOC) of the 4th Infantry Division.

He was replaced as divisional commander after the Battle of Dunkirk in June 1940 and made GOC Aldershot Command later on in 1940 before becoming Inspector of Infantry in 1941. He retired in 1944 and was Colonel of the South Wales Borderers from 1944 to 1949.

His Victoria Cross is displayed at the South Wales Borderers Museum, Brecon, Powys, Wales.

== Family ==
Johnson was married to Marjorie Grisewood, who died in 1950. They had one son and two daughters and, after his wife's death, spent the last 25 years of his life a widower.

== Bibliography ==
- Buzzell, Nora, ed. (1997). The Register of the Victoria Cross. Cheltenham, Gloucestershire: This England Alma House. ISBN 0-906324-27-0.
- Gliddon, Gerald (2014) [2000]. The Final Days 1918. VCs of the First World War. Stroud, Gloucestershire: The History Press. ISBN 978-0-7509-5368-9.
- Smart, Nick (2005). Biographical Dictionary of British Generals of the Second World War. Barnsley, South Yorkshire: Pen and Sword Books. ISBN 1844150496.

Military offices
| Preceded by Cyril Gepp | Commandant of the Small Arms School; 1936–1938 | Succeeded by Russell Gurney |
| Preceded by Clive Liddell | GOC 4th Infantry Division; 1938–1940 | Succeeded by Ralph Eastwood |
| Preceded by Sir Geoffrey Raikes | GOC-in-C Aldershot Command; 1940–1941 | Post disbanded |
Honorary titles
| Preceded by Llewellyn Owen | Colonel of the South Wales Borderers; 1944–1949 | Succeeded by Sir Reade Godwin-Austen |
