= Cuthbert Fuller =

Major-General Cuthbert Fuller CB CMG DSO
- Born: 15 October 1874
- Died: 15 May 1960 (aged 85)
- Military career
- Allegiance: United Kingdom
- Branch: British Army
- Rank: Major-General
- Commands: 48th (South Midland) Division; Canal Brigade; 130th Infantry Brigade
- Conflicts: Second Boer War; First World War
- Awards: Companion of the Order of the Bath; Companion of the Order of St Michael and St George; Distinguished Service Order; Mentioned in Despatches

Major-General Cuthbert Graham Fuller, CB, CMG, DSO (15 October 1874 – 15 May 1960) was a Royal Engineers officer.

== Military career ==
Fuller was born in to Belfast, Ireland, to George Fuller and Antoinette Cumming. He was educated at Beaumont College and the Royal Military Academy, Woolwich. He was commissioned second lieutenant in the Royal Engineers on 25 July 1893, and promoted to lieutenant on 25 July 1896.

He served in South Africa during the Second Boer War between 1899 and 1902, and was mentioned in despatches. On 1 January 1902 he appointed a Deputy Assistant Director of Railways stationed in Transvaal.

By 1914, Fuller was a major. He served in Gallipoli, Egypt, and France during the First World War, earning the brevet rank of lieutenant colonel. He was promoted on 3 June 1918 to brevet colonel.

He became commander of the 130th Infantry Brigade in 1923, commander of the Canal Brigade in Egypt in 1925. He was promoted to major general on 16 April 1928 and relinquished this appointment on 28 July and was placed on half-pay. He was then Major-General in charge of administration at Eastern Command on 23 April 1929. He became General Officer Commanding, 48th (South Midland) Division, Territorial Army in June 1931. He relinquished command of the division on 1 June 1935. and retired from the army on the same date.

Fuller was appointed a Companion of the Order of St Michael and St George (CMG) in 1919 for services in France and Flanders, and a Companion of the Order of the Bath (CB) in the 1926 Birthday Honours.

== Personal life ==
In 1912, Fuller married Princess Sophia Vladimirovna, daughter of Prince Vladimir Shahoffsky.

Military offices
Preceded by Ivo Vesey	GOC 48th (South Midland) Division; 1931–1935	Succeeded by Stephen Butler
