= John Willoughby (British Army officer) =

Major-General Sir John Willoughby KBE CB
- Born: 18 June 1913
- Died: February 1991 (aged 77)
- Military career
- Allegiance: United Kingdom
- Branch: British Army
- Service years: 1933−1967
- Rank: Major-General
- Service number: 58173
- Unit: Middlesex Regiment
- Commands: 1st Battalion, Middlesex Regiment; 168th (2nd London) Brigade; 48th (South Midland) Division/District; Middle East Land Forces
- Conflicts: Second World War; Cyprus Emergency; Aden Emergency
- Awards: Knight Commander of the Order of the British Empire; Companion of the Order of the Bath

Major-General Sir John Edward Francis Willoughby, KBE, CB (18 June 1913 – February 1991) was a British Army officer.

== Military career ==
After graduating from the Royal Military College, Sandhurst, Willoughby was commissioned into the Middlesex Regiment on 2 February 1933. After serving with the 2nd Battalion, The Middlesex Regiment as part the British Expeditionary Force and then taking part in the Dunkirk evacuation, he served in India and Burma during the Second World War.

He went on to become commanding officer of the 1st Battalion, The Middlesex Regiment in Cyprus in October 1955 during the Cyprus Emergency, commander of the 168th (2nd London) Brigade in September 1959 and Chief of Staff for British Forces, Hong Kong in August 1961.

After that he became General Officer Commanding GOC 48th (South Midland) Division/District of the Territorial Army in March 1963, General Officer Commanding Middle East Land Forces in Aden in May 1965 during the Aden Emergency and then Head of the British Military Mission to Zambia in January 1966 before retiring in August 1967.

Military offices
Preceded by John Worsley	GOC 48th (South Midland) Division/District; 1963–1965	Succeeded by Peter Gillett
