= John Worsley (British Army officer) =

British Army general (1912–1987)

Lieutenant-General Sir John Worsley KBE CB MC
- Born: 8 July 1912
- Died: 1987 (aged 74−75)
- Military career
- Allegiance: United Kingdom
- Branch: British Army
- Service years: 1934−1968
- Rank: Lieutenant-General
- Units: 2nd Punjab Regiment; York and Lancaster Regiment; South Lancashire Regiment
- Commands: 2nd Battalion, 1st Punjab Regiment; 1st Bn South Lancashire Regiment; 6th Infantry Brigade Group; 48th (South Midland) Division/District; Staff College, Camberley; Commander of British Forces in Hong Kong
- Conflicts: World War II
- Awards: Knight Commander of the Order of the British Empire; Companion of the Order of the Bath; Military Cross

Lieutenant-General Sir John Francis Worsley KBE CB MC (1912 – 1987) was Commander of British Forces in Hong Kong.

== Military career ==
Worsley was commissioned into the 3rd Battalion, 2nd Punjab Regiment of the British Indian Army in 1934 and served on the North West Frontier in India from 1935.

He served in World War II and fought at the Battle of Keren in Eritrea in 1941.

After the War he became commanding officer of 2 Bn 1st Punjab Regiment and then transferred to the York and Lancaster Regiment at Indian Independence in 1947. He became a general staff officer at the War Office in 1949 and then at Headquarters 1st Infantry Division at Middle East Land Forces in 1952. He was made commanding officer of 1st Bn South Lancashire Regiment serving in the Suez Canal Zone in 1953 and then secretary of the Joint Planning Staff at the Ministry of Defence in 1956. He was appointed commander of 6th Infantry Brigade Group in 1957 and general officer commanding 48th (South Midland) Division/District of the Territorial Army in 1961. He was made commandant of the Staff College, Camberley in 1963 and Commander of British Forces in Hong Kong in 1966; he retired in 1968.

Military offices
New title	GOC 48th (South Midland) Division/District; 1961–1963	Succeeded by John Willoughby
Preceded by Charles Harington	Commandant of the Staff College, Camberley; 1963–1966	Succeeded by Mervyn Butler
Preceded by Sir Denis O'Connor	Commander of British Forces in Hong Kong; 1966–1968	Succeeded by Sir Basil Eugster
