= Herbert Cokayne Frith =

Brigadier-General Herbert Cokayne Frith CB
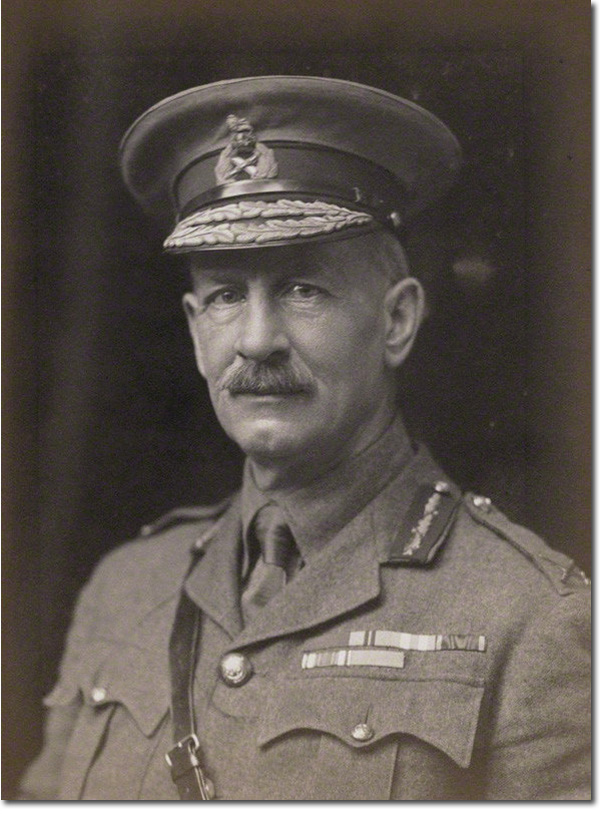
- Born: Gainsborough, Lincolnshire, England
- Military career
- Allegiance: United Kingdom
- Branch: British Army
- Service years: 1882 – 1918
- Rank: Brigadier-General
- Commands: 1st Battalion, Somerset Light Infantry; 42nd (East Lancashire) Infantry Division
- Conflicts: First World War
- Awards: Companion of the Order of the Bath

Brigadier-General Herbert Cokayne Frith, CB (12 July 1861 – 1942) was a senior British Army officer who briefly served as General Officer Commanding 42nd (East Lancashire) Infantry Division during the First World War.

== Military career ==
Frith was commissioned into the Somerset Light Infantry on 28 January 1882.

He served with the Egyptian Army at the Battle of Ginnis in December 1885 and at the Battle of Toski in August 1889 during the Mahdist War.

He became commanding officer of the 1st Battalion, Somerset Light Infantry, in November 1909, after being promoted to lieutenant colonel.

In June 1913 he was promoted to colonel, and in May 1914 he was given command of the Lancashire Fusiliers Brigade, a Territorial Force (TF) formation which formed part of the East Lancashire Division.

On 5 August 1914, a day after the British entry into World War I, he was promoted to the temporary rank of brigadier general. He was to remain in command of his brigade, which later became the 125th (Lancashire Fusiliers) Infantry Brigade in 1915, and which he would command for over three years, leading the brigade throughout the Gallipoli campaign. He briefly served as acting general officer commanding (GOC) of the 42nd (East Lancashire) Division from 29 December 1915 to 21 January 1916 in Egypt and again from 2 March 1917 to 10 March 1917 in France. He was appointed a Companion of the Order of the Bath (CB) for his services in Egypt on 3 June 1916. He reverted to his substantive rank of colonel and was placed on the half-pay list in June 1917. The following month, however, he regained his brigadier's rank and was employed with the British Indian Army.
