= Hew Butler =

British Army general

Major-General Hew Butler CB DL
- Born: 12 March 1922
- Died: 10 July 2007 (aged 85)
- Military career
- Allegiance: United Kingdom
- Branch: British Army
- Rank: Major-General
- Commands: Near East Land Forces; 24th Infantry Brigade; 3rd Green Jackets, Rifle Brigade
- Conflicts: Second World War
- Awards: Companion of the Order of the Bath; Mentioned in Despatches

Major-General Hew Dacres George Butler, CB, DL (12 March 1922 – 10 July 2007) was a senior officer in the British Army.

== Early life ==
Hew Dacres George Butler was born on 12 March 1922, the second of two sons born to Major General Stephen Seymour Butler by his wife Phyllis, daughter of Captain H. Critchley-Salmonson. In 1954, he married Joanna Christiane Aline, daughter of Geoffrey Martin Puckridge; they had two sons and one daughter.

== Military career ==
Following schooling at Winchester College, Butler was commissioned into the Rifle Brigade in 1941. He served in the Middle East with the 7th Battalion from 1942, but was wounded the following March during the Battle of Mareth Line and taken prisoner. Eventually transferred to Stalag VIIA, he escaped in December 1943 but was recaptured. He served out the rest of the war as prisoner.

In 1949, Butler was posted as an instructor at the School of Infantry. He was Brigade Major of the 7th Armoured Brigade between 1951 and 1953 and then served in Kenya between 1954 and 1955. Two years later, he was appointed an Instructor at the Staff College, in which position he served until 1960. Two years later, he was placed in command of the 3rd Green Jackets, Rifle Brigade, in Cyprus, where he was mentioned in despatches. He then commanded the 24th Infantry Brigade in Aden (1966–67). He served as General Officer Commanding, Near East Land Forces, between 1972 and 1974 after which he was chief of staff with responsibility for Contingencies Planning at Supreme Headquarters Allied Powers Europe. He relinquished that appointed in 1976 and retired in 1977.

In civilian life, Butler was Secretary of the Beit Trust from 1978 to 1993. He became a Deputy Lieutenant in 1980 and served as High Sheriff of Hampshire in 1983. He died on 10 July 2007.
