= Russell Gurney (British Army officer) =

British Army general (1890–1947)

Major-General Russell Gurney CB
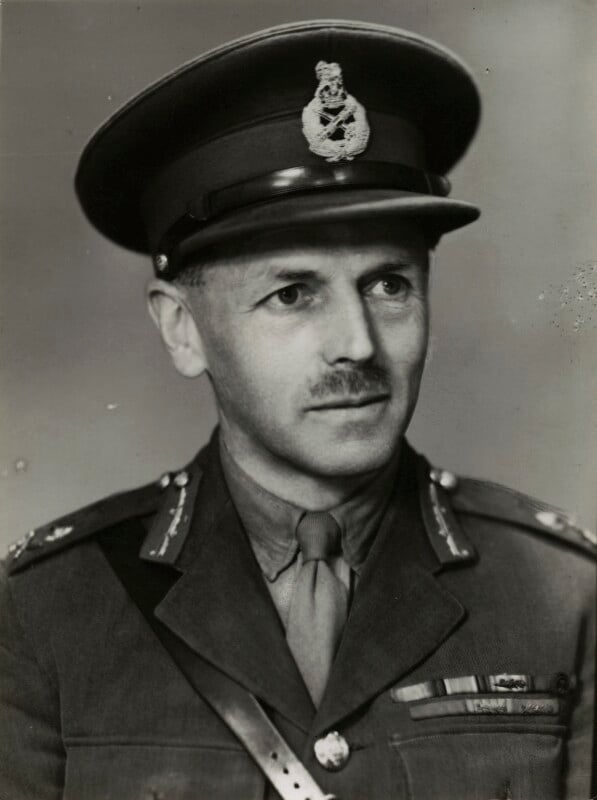
- Gurney, c. 1940
- Born: 1890
- Died: 1947 (aged 57); Devon, England
- Military career
- Allegiance: United Kingdom
- Branch: British Army
- Service years: 1915–1947
- Rank: Major-General
- Service number: 8988
- Units: Northamptonshire Regiment; Suffolk Regiment
- Commands: 17th Infantry Brigade (1939); Small Arms School, Netheravon (1938–1939); 1st Battalion, Suffolk Regiment (1937–1938)
- Conflicts: First World War; Second World War
- Awards: Companion of the Order of the Bath; Mentioned in Despatches; Order of the Crown of Italy; Legion of Honour (France); Order of the Crown (Belgium); Croix de Guerre (Belgium)

Major-General Russell Gurney, CB (1890–1947) was a British Army officer who served in both the First World War and Second World War.

== Military career ==
Born in 1890, Russell Gurney was the son of a clergyman and was educated at Clifton College. He volunteered for the British Army during the First World War and was commissioned into the Northamptonshire Regiment in 1915, with which he saw service in France and, later, Italy. In April 1918 he was made a general staff officer, grade 2.

Gurney remained in the army during the interwar period and attended the Staff College, Camberley from 1921 to 1922. On 13 May 1925 he was temporarily appointed as a brigade major.

He was married in 1928 and gave up his GSO2 appointment at the War Office in London in March 1934. In 1935, he wrote a history of his regiment, before transferring to the Suffolk Regiment and assuming command of the 1st Battalion of his new regiment in 1937. The following year he became commandant of the Small Arms School at Netheravon, Wiltshire.

Gurney served in this capacity until early October 1939, a few weeks after the outbreak of the Second World War, when he assumed command of the 17th Infantry Brigade. He was not there long, however, as he was declared medically unfit until, in 1940, he was posted to the War Office as a General Staff Officer Grade 1. He was to remain in this post until the following year, when he was made Senior Umpire with Home Forces, before again returning to the War Office, this time serving on Special Employment. On 23 February 1943 he was promoted to the acting rank of major general as he was made Director of Personnel Services at the War Office. He held this position until 1947, the year he retired from the army, after 33 years of service. Gurney died, after a short illness, in his home in Devon, at the age of 57.

== Bibliography ==
- Smart, Nick (2005). Biographical Dictionary of British Generals of the Second World War. Barnesley: Pen & Sword. ISBN 1844150496.

Military offices
Preceded by Dudley Johnson	Commandant of the Small Arms School; 1938–1939	Succeeded by Frederick Browning
