= 143rd Regiment Royal Armoured Corps =

143rd Regiment Royal Armoured Corps (9th Lancashire Fusiliers)
- Active: 1941–1943
- Disbanded: 1943
- Country: United Kingdom
- Branch: British Army
- Type: Armoured Regiment
- Role: Infantry Support; Training
- Part of: Royal Armoured Corps
- Anniversaries: Minden Day (1 August)
- Equipment: Churchill; Covenanter

The 143rd Regiment Royal Armoured Corps (9th Lancashire Fusiliers) (143 RAC) was a short-lived armoured regiment of the British Army's Royal Armoured Corps during World War II.

== Origin ==
143rd Regiment RAC was formed on 1 November 1941 by the conversion to the armoured role of 9th Battalion of the Lancashire Fusiliers, a hostilities-only infantry battalion raised in 1940. 9th Lancashire Fusiliers had been serving in 125th Infantry Brigade of 42nd (East Lancashire) Infantry Division, which were redesignated 10th Armoured Brigade and 42nd Armoured Division respectively. All three regiments in the brigade were drawn from the Lancashire Fusiliers and underwent simultaneous conversion to armour (the other two became 108 RAC and 109 RAC respectively).

In common with other infantry units transferred to the Royal Armoured Corps, all personnel would have continued to wear their Lancashire Fusiliers cap badge on the black beret of the RAC. Surplus personnel were posted to 15th and 44th Reconnaissance Battalions or to 2/5th and 2/6th battalions of the Lancashire Fusiliers. In common with the other units of 10th Armoured Bde, 143 RAC maintained Lancashire Fusilier traditions, celebrating Minden Day on 1 August each year.

== History ==
In May–June 1942, 10th Armoured Bde (later 10th Tank Bde) became an independent formation, and moved from Barnard Castle, County Durham, to 'The Dukeries' area of Nottinghamshire to continue tank training. 143 RAC was based at Thoresby Hall and operated Churchill infantry tanks, later receiving some Covenanter cruiser tanks from the Guards Armoured Division as well.

By the end of 1942, large numbers of 143 RAC's trained officers and men were being posted overseas. During 1943, 10th Tank Brigade became a holding and training formation for replacements. In August 1943, rumours began to circulate that 10th Tank Brigade was scheduled for disbandment, and a recruiting team arrived to persuade men to volunteer for the Parachute Regiment if the brigade disbanded. The brigade moved to Wensleydale in September 1943, with 143 RAC based at Hawes, but soon afterwards began to disperse. During December, officers and men were posted from 143 RAC to drafts and training regiments, many specialists going to the Royal Army Service Corps, Royal Army Ordnance Corps etc. Formal disbandment of 143rd Regiment RAC (9th Lancashire Fusiliers) was completed on 31 December 1943.

== External sources ==
- Land Forces of Britain, the Empire and Commonwealth (Regiments.org)
