= 109th Regiment Royal Armoured Corps =

109th Regiment Royal Armoured Corps (The Lancashire Fusiliers)
- Active: 1941–1943
- Disbanded: 1943
- Country: United Kingdom
- Branch: British Army
- Type: Armoured Regiment
- Role: Infantry Support; Training
- Part of: Royal Armoured Corps
- Anniversaries: Minden Day (1 August)
- Equipment: Churchill; Valentine

109th Regiment Royal Armoured Corps (The Lancashire Fusiliers) (109 RAC) was an armoured regiment of the British Army's Royal Armoured Corps during World War II.

== Origin ==
109th Regiment RAC was formed on 1 November 1941 by the conversion to the armoured role of 1/6th Battalion of the Lancashire Fusiliers, a 1st line Territorial Army infantry unit. The battalion had been serving in 125th Infantry Brigade of 42nd (East Lancashire) Infantry Division, which were redesignated 10th Armoured Brigade and 42nd Armoured Division respectively. All three regiments in the brigade were drawn from the Lancashire Fusiliers and underwent simultaneous conversion to armour (the other two became 108 RAC and 143 RAC). In common with other infantry units transferred to the Royal Armoured Corps, personnel continued to wear their Lancashire Fusiliers buttons and the cap badge on the black beret of the Royal Armoured Corps, but the rank of 'Fusilier' for private soldiers was replaced by 'Trooper', despite some resistance from the regiment. The regiment also continued to call itself '1/6th Bn The Lancashire Fusiliers (109th RAC)', but was later told to desist and adopt the official name.

== History ==
In May–June 1942, 10th Armoured Bde (later 10th Tank Brigade) became an independent formation, and moved from Barnard Castle, County Durham, to 'The Dukeries' area of Nottinghamshire to continue tank training. 109 RAC was based at Welbeck Abbey, and the following month the partly trained and partly equipped regiment was given the operational role (in case of enemy invasion) of providing HQ squadron and one tank squadron (drawn from all three of its squadrons) of Churchill and Valentine tanks for a composite battalion from the brigade.

In common with the other units of 10th Tank Bde, 109 RAC maintained Lancashire Fusilier traditions, celebrating Minden Day on 1 August each year. However, in August 1943, rumours began to circulate that 10th Tank Brigade was scheduled for disbandment. Members of Parliament for the Lancashire towns complained about the possible loss of their TA battalions, and a recruiting team arrived to persuade men to volunteer for the Parachute Regiment if the brigade disbanded. Although 10th Tank Bde moved to Wensleydale in September, with 109 RAC based at Leyburn, and became a holding and training formation for reinforcements, the impending disbandment was confirmed shortly afterwards. During November and December, 109 RAC's officers and men were progressively posted overseas or to 51st Training Regiment RAC at nearby Catterick. Disbandment was completed by the end of the year and 1/6th Lancashire Fusiliers went into a state of 'suspended animation' on 1 January 1944. Unlike 1/5th Battalion, Lancashire Fusiliers, which was reformed after the war, after the disbandment of 108 RAC, the 1/6th Battalion has never been reformed.

== External sources ==
- Land Forces of Britain, the Empire and Commonwealth (Regiments.org)
