= Cruiser Mk II =

British cruiser tank

Tank, Cruiser, Mk II (A10)
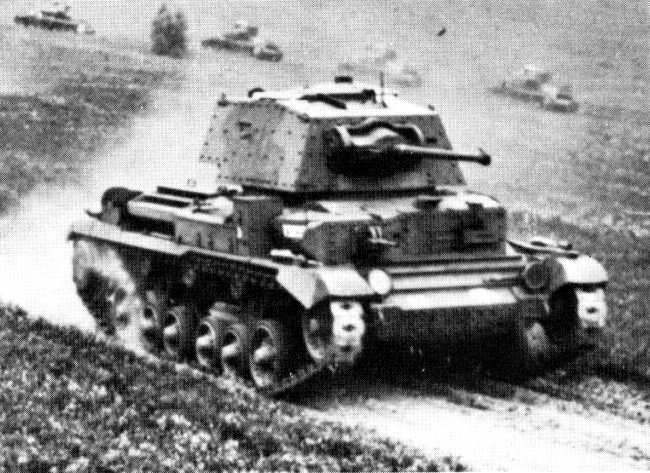
- Type: Cruiser tank
- Place of origin: United Kingdom

Service history
- In service: 1940–1941
- Used by: British Army
- Wars: Second World War

Production history
- Designer: Sir John Carden
- Designed: 1934
- Manufacturer: Vickers and others
- Produced: 1938–1940
- No. built: 175

Specifications
- Mass: 14.3 tonnes
- Length: 18 ft 4 in (5.59 m)
- Width: 8 ft 4 in (2.54 m)
- Height: 8 ft 8 in (2.64 m)
- Crew: 5 (Commander, loader, gunner, driver, hull MG gunner)
- Armour: 6–30 mm (0.24–1.18 in)
- Main armament: QF 2-pdr 100 rounds
- Secondary armament: 1 x Vickers machine gun (A10 Mk I); 2 x BESA machine guns (A10 Mk IA); 4,050 rounds
- Engine: AEC Type A179 6-cylinder petrol 150 hp (110 kW)
- Suspension: triple wheel bogie with coil spring
- Operational range: 100 mi (160 km) (road)
- Maximum speed: 16 mph (26 km/h) (road); 8 mph (13 km/h) (off-road)

The Tank, Cruiser, Mk II (A10), was a cruiser tank developed alongside the A9 cruiser tank, and was intended to be a heavier, infantry tank version of that type. In practice, it was not deemed suitable for the infantry tank role and was classified as a "heavy cruiser". It served briefly in World War II.

== History and specifications ==
The A10 was developed by Sir John Carden of Vickers in 1934 by the adaptation of his A9 design. The A10 specification called for armour of up to 1 inch (25 mm) standard (the A9 was 14 mm (0.55 in)); a speed of 10 mph (16 km/h)) was acceptable. The two sub-turrets present on the A9 were removed, and extra armour bolted onto that already present on the front and sides of the hull, along with all faces of the turret, providing approximately twice the armour in most areas. The A10 was two tonnes heavier than the A9, but used the same 150 bhp (110 kW) engine, and as a consequence the tank's top speed was cut from 25 miles per hour (40 km/h) to 16 miles per hour (26 km/h).

The turret armament consisted of a QF 2-pounder (40-mm) gun and a coaxial .303 Vickers machine gun. For the production version, there was a 7.92 mm BESA machine gun mounted in the hull in a barbette to the right of the driver. This was added to give extra firepower, but at the expense of simplicity - the Vickers and the BESA using different ammunition. The tank had a crew of five (Commander, gunner, loader, driver and hull machine gunner). There was no separation between the driver's compartment and the fighting compartments.

The prototype ("Tank, Experimental A10E1") was completed in 1936, a few months after the A9 prototype. Carden had died in an air crash in 1935 and development was slower than expected. In 1937, the A10 was dropped as an infantry support tank, but in 1938 it was decided to produce an order of 75 as an interim "heavy cruiser".

The A10 was accepted for service - initially as "Tank, Cruiser, Heavy Mk I" and then "Tank, Cruiser A10 Mk I" and finally "Tank, Cruiser Mk II". Production was ordered in July 1938. Total production was 175 vehicles, including the 30 CS versions (see below); 45 were built by Birmingham Railway Carriage & Wagon Company, 45 by Metropolitan-Cammell, 10 by Vickers. In late 1939, another order was placed with Birmingham Railway Carriage & Wagon Company, this time for a larger order of 75 vehicles. Entering service in December 1939 the tank was something of an oddity, it had been intended to sacrifice speed for armour like an Infantry tank but was still relatively poorly armoured and not effective.

== Combat history ==
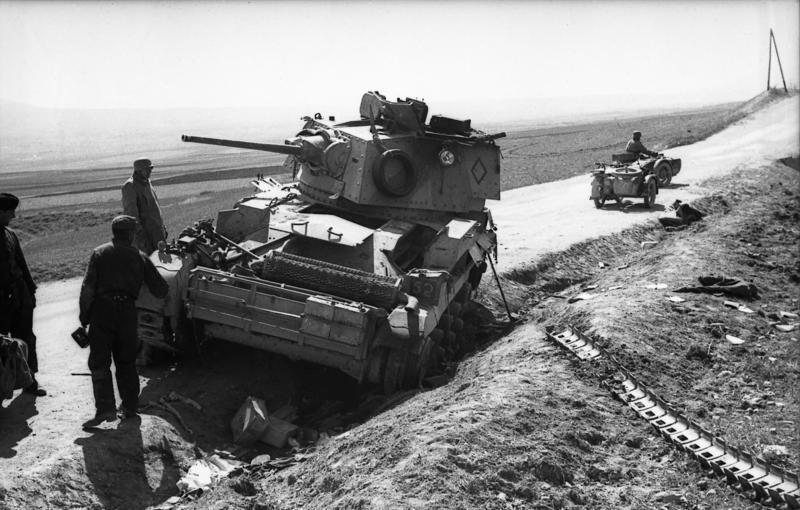
A British Cruiser Mk II disabled by having lost a track (seen lower right) in Greece, 1941.

A number of Mark IIs were part of the British Expeditionary Force (BEF) sent to France in the early stages of the Second World War. The cross country performance was recorded as poor, but they were still used later in North Africa at the defence of Tobruk in 1941, where reliability and suspension performance in the desert conditions was praised. Sixty worn out examples were taken to Greece by the 3rd Royal Tank Regiment and, although they performed well against the German tanks, over 90% were lost due to mechanical breakdowns as opposed to enemy action (mainly lost tracks).

== Variants ==
In total, 61 with Vickers machine guns and 99 with Besa machine guns were produced.

Tank\Year	Pre-War	Sep-Dec 1939	1940	1941
Cruiser, Mk. II (A.10 Mk. I)	—	1	60	—
Cruiser, Mk. IIA (A.10 Mk. IA)	—	—	89	10

Tank, Cruiser, Mk II (A10 Mk I)

Classified as a 'heavy cruiser', 31 were sent to France with the 1st Armoured Division, but performed poorly in the Battle of France. The tank also served in the North African Campaign until late 1941.

Tank, Cruiser, Mk IIA (A10 Mk IA)

The coaxial Vickers machine guns were replaced with BESA machine guns. Armoured radio housing added.

Tank, Cruiser, Mk IIA CS (A10 Mk IA CS)

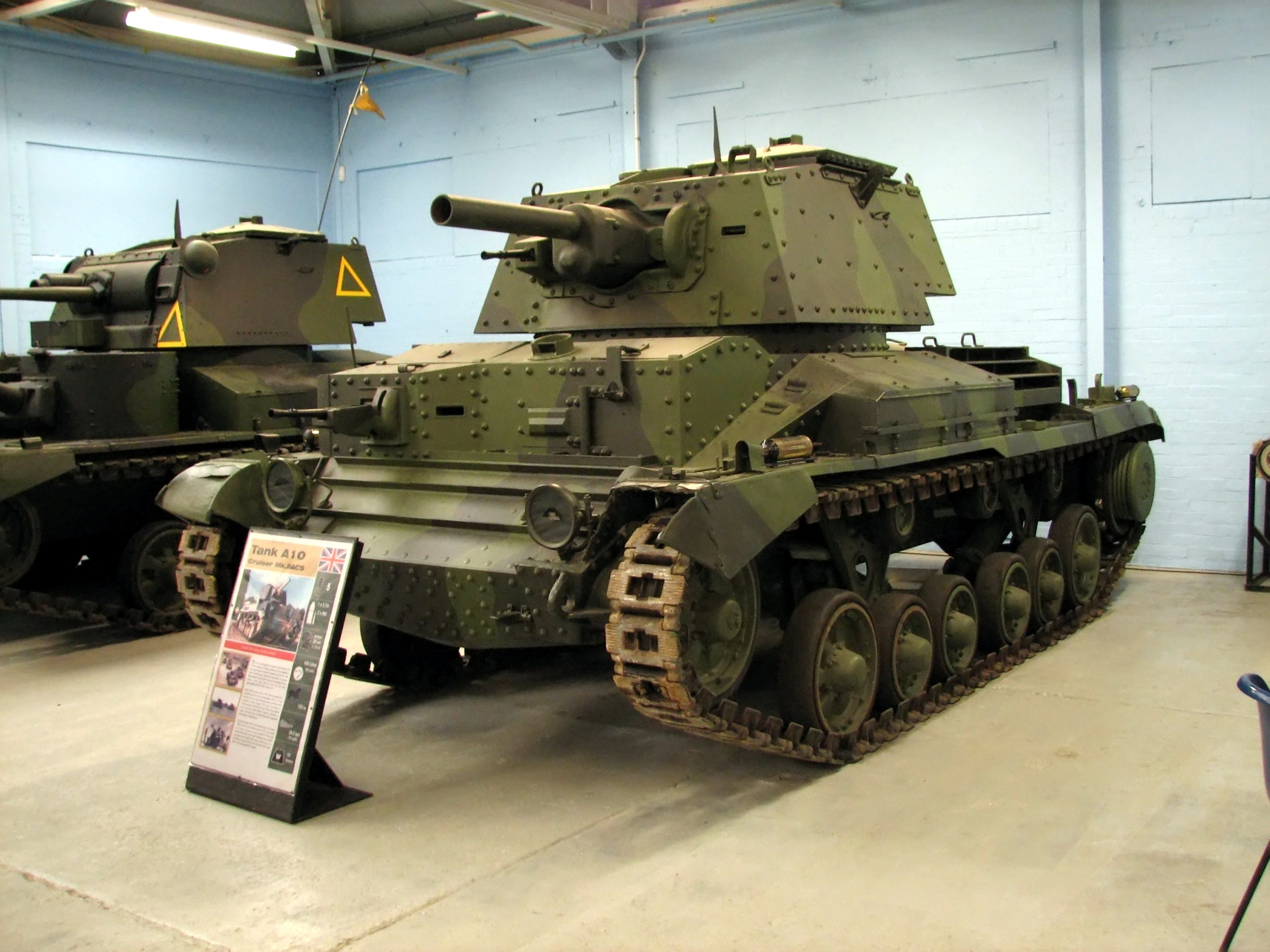
Cruiser MkIIA CS

The CS (Close Support) version of the Mark II had a 3.7 in (94 mm) howitzer in the turret instead of the 2-pdr. The standard ammunition load was 40 rounds smoke, and a few HE shells.

This weapon was derived from a World War I field howitzer, the QF 3.7-inch mountain howitzer. It was not related to the 3-inch (76 mm) howitzer used in later British tanks in the Second World War, which was itself replaced by a 95 mm (3.7 in) howitzer in the later versions of the Churchill infantry tanks and all CS versions of the Centaur and Cromwell cruiser tanks. British doctrine was that the CS tank was to provide smoke cover in advances or retreats and hence many more smoke rounds were carried than HE.

== Related vehicles ==
The Valentine used the suspension and transmission of the A10 but with a much more heavily armoured hull and turret.

== See also ==
- Cruiser Mk III
