= 42nd Armoured Division (United Kingdom) =

- 42nd Armoured Division insignia
- Active: 1 November 1941 – 17 October 1943
- Country: United Kingdom
- Branch: British Army
- Type: Armoured Division
- Size: 13,235 men 227 tanks (Note: 201 tanks and 26 anti-aircraft tanks.) (Note: These two figures are the war establishment, the on-paper strength, of the division; for information on how divisions size changed over the war, please see British Army during the Second World War and British Armoured formations of World War II.)

Commanders
- Notable commanders: Miles Dempsey

The 42nd Armoured Division was an armoured division of the British Army raised during the Second World War.

== History ==
=== War Service ===
The division was formed in late 1941 by converting the 42nd (East Lancashire) Infantry Division. The 42nd Division was a 1st Line Territorial Army (TA) infantry formation that saw service in the Battle of France and was evacuated at Dunkirk in June 1940. The division was converted on 1 November 1941 into an armoured division. The division's first commander was Major-General Miles C. Dempsey.

However, the division was not posted overseas and its divisional headquarters was disbanded on 17 October 1943; the division's infantry was assigned to the 53rd (Welsh) Infantry Division and its armour to the 79th Armoured Division.

== General Officer Commanding ==
Two men served as the General Officer Commanding of the 42nd Armoured Division:

- Major-General Miles Dempsey: November 1941-December 1942
- Major-General John Aldam Aizlewood: December 1942-October 1943

== Order of battle ==
=== 10th Armoured Brigade ===
- 108th Regiment Royal Armoured Corps (Lancashire Fusiliers)
- 109th Regiment Royal Armoured Corps (Lancashire Fusiliers)
- 143rd Regiment Royal Armoured Corps (Lancashire Fusiliers)
- 13th Battalion, Highland Light Infantry

On 1 November 1941, the 10th Armoured Brigade was converted from the 125th Infantry Brigade, of three battalions of the Lancashire Fusiliers, and was attached to the 42nd Armoured Division. It comprised the 108 RAC (previously 1/5th Battalion), 109 RAC (1/6th Battalion) and 143 RAC (9th Battalion). On 25 July 1942, the brigade was converted again into the 10th Tank Brigade and finally disbanded on 25 November 1943. The 10th Armoured Brigade did not see active service as a unit and was broken up in late 1943.

=== 11th Armoured Brigade ===
- 107th Regiment Royal Armoured Corps (King's Own)
- 110th Regiment Royal Armoured Corps (Border Regiment)
- 111th Regiment Royal Armoured Corps (Manchester Regiment)
- 1st Battalion, Highland Light Infantry

=== 42nd Support Group ===
- 1st Battalion, East Lancashire Regiment
- 147th (Essex Yeomanry) Regiment, Royal Horse Artillery
- 53rd (Worcestershire and Oxfordshire Yeomanry) Anti-Tank Regiment, Royal Artillery
- 93rd Light Anti-Aircraft Regiment, Royal Artillery

In the early days of the Second World War the support group (or Pivot Group as it was sometimes known) was what its name suggested. It provided whatever support the armoured brigades needed to the operation in hand, being able to provide motorised infantry, field artillery, anti-tank artillery or light anti-aircraft artillery as needed.

=== Divisional troops ===
- 112th Regiment Royal Armoured Corps (Foresters) (armoured car regiment) (from 17 November 1941, left 24 February 1943)
- 1st Northamptonshire Yeomanry (from 18 April 1943, left 16 October 1943)
- HQ 42nd Divisional Engineers
  - 16th Field Company, Royal Engineers
  - 17th Field Company, RE (became 617th Field Company 1 March 1943)
  - 149th Field Park Company, RE
- 42nd (East Lancashire) Armoured Divisional Signals, Royal Corps of Signals

== See also ==
- List of British divisions in World War II
- British Armoured formations of World War II

== Notes ==
Footnotes

Citations
