= Minden Day =

Anniversary of the British Army's victory in the Battle of Minden (1 August 1759)

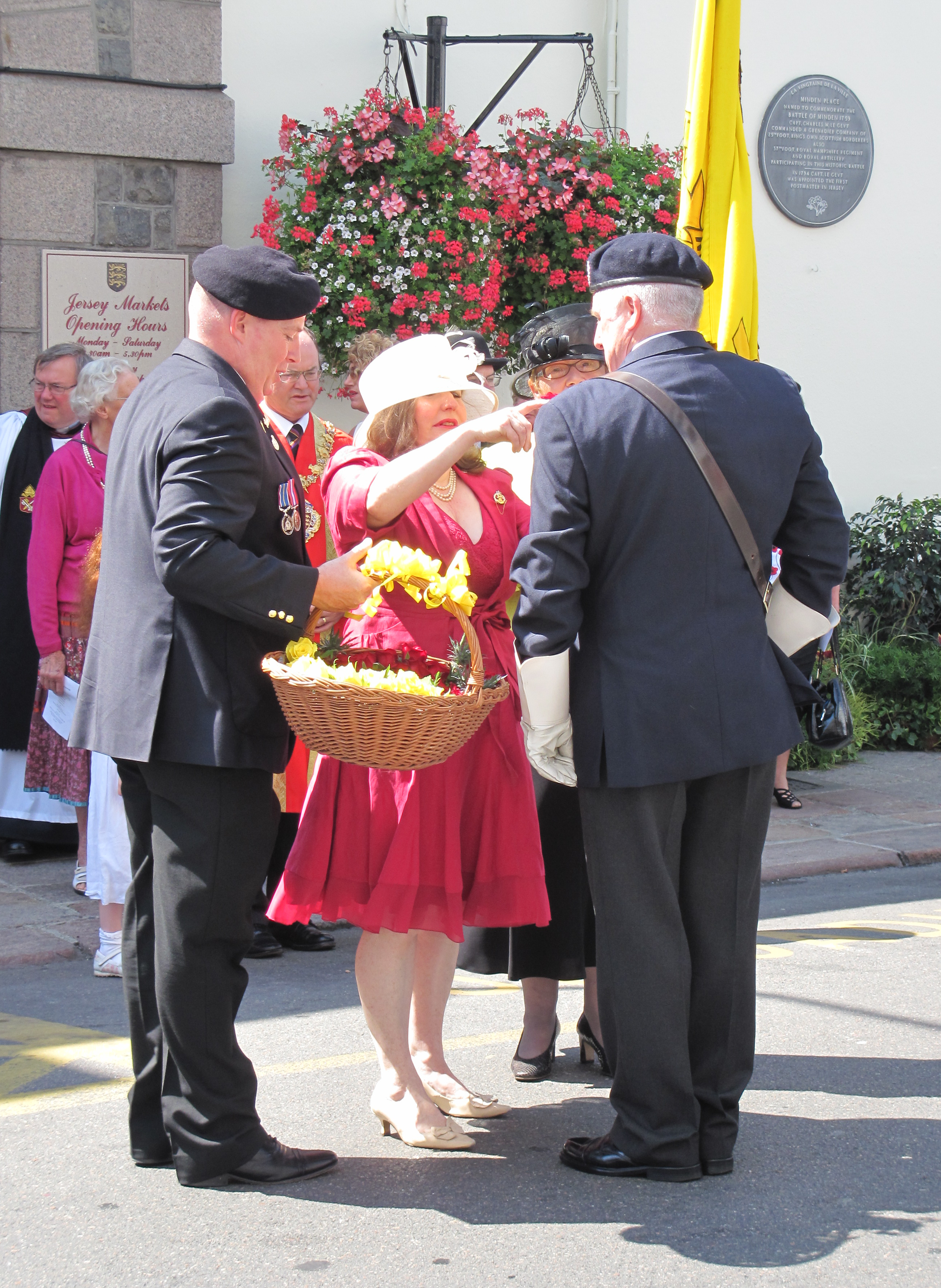
The presentation of roses to commemorate Minden Day in Saint Helier, Jersey – a plaque recording Jersey's association with the Battle of Minden can be seen in the background

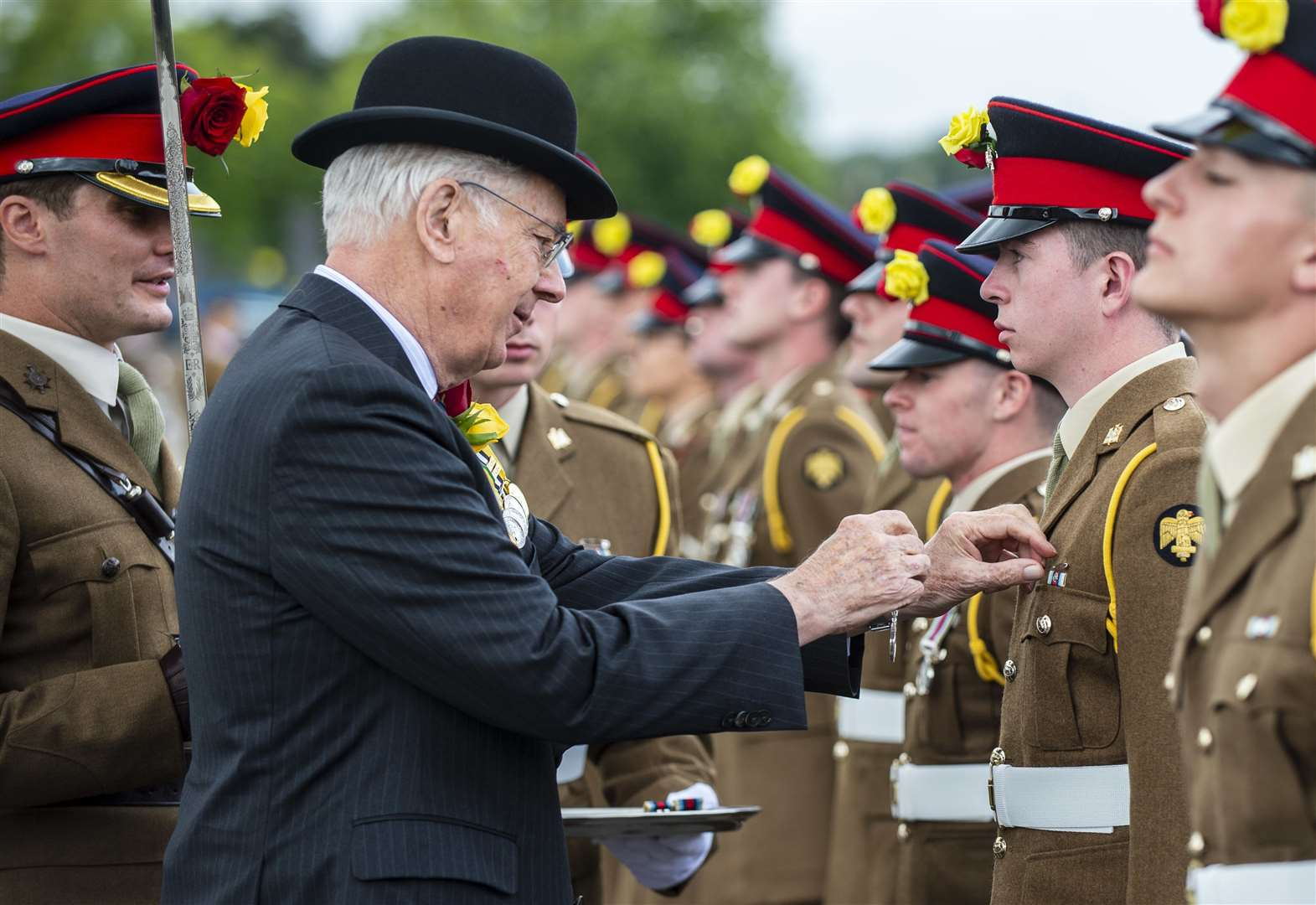
The Duke of Gloucester presents medals to members of 1st Battalion, The Royal Anglian Regiment, in Woolwich on 1 August 2019; red and yellow roses are worn in the soldiers' hats

Minden Day is a regimental anniversary celebrated on 1 August by certain units of the British Army. It commemorates the participation of the forerunners of the regiments in the Battle of Minden during the Seven Years' War on that date in 1759. In the battle, an Anglo-German army under the overall command of Prussian Field Marshal Ferdinand of Brunswick defeated a French army. The Annus Mirabilis of 1759 (Latin 'wonderful year') was a string of notable British and allied victories over their French-led opponents

The celebration of the day involves the wearing of "Minden Roses" on the regimental head dress, and in the case of the infantry regiments, the decoration of the regimental colours with garlands of roses. This recalls that the regiments wore wild roses at the battle that they had plucked from the hedgerows as they advanced to engage the enemy.

Minden Day is celebrated by:

- 12 (Minden) Air Assault Battery, 12th Regiment Royal Artillery
- 32 (Minden 1759) Battery, 16th Regiment Royal Artillery
- The Royal Scots Borderers, The Royal Regiment of Scotland, as successors to the King's Own Scottish Borderers, successors to the 25th Regiment of Foot
- 1st Battalion, The Royal Anglian Regiment, as successors to the Suffolk Regiment, successors 12th Regiment of Foot
- HQ Company, 3rd Battalion, The Royal Anglian Regiment (Army Reserve)
- The Royal Regiment of Fusiliers, as successors the Lancashire Fusiliers, successors to the 20th Regiment of Foot
- The Royal Welsh, successors to the Royal Welch Fusiliers, successors to the 23rd Regiment of Foot
- The Princess of Wales's Royal Regiment, as successors to the Royal Hampshire Regiment, successors to the 37th Regiment of Foot
- 3rd and 5th Battalions The Rifles, successors to The Light Infantry, successors to the 51st Regiment of Foot
- The North Saskatchewan Regiment [Reserve Canadian Army] successors to the Saskatoon Light Infantry in honour of a regimental alliance with The King's Own Yorkshire Light Infantry. The N.Sask.R. wears the white rose.

The colours of roses varies: red and yellow roses are worn by most of the units (including the Royal Regiment of Fusiliers and the Royal Anglians - both of whom continue to mark Minden as one of their most important regimental days), the PWRR wear a single red rose, whilst a white rose is favoured by the Light Infantry. In some cases this reflects parts of the regimental recruiting areas: the PWRR have strong links with Hampshire (whose badge is a red rose) and the Light Infantry is associated with part of Yorkshire (represented by a white rose).

In 1975, 1 August was adopted as Yorkshire Day, partly to reflect the presence of Yorkshire soldiers at the battle.

Minden Day is commemorated in the folk song "Lowlands of Holland", which dates to the time of the Seven Years' War. Like many folk songs, it has numerous variants. One version, which is prevalent in Suffolk, home of 12th Regiment of Foot (1st Battalion, Royal Anglian Regiment), contains the verse:

"My love across the ocean Wears a scarlet coat so fair, With a musket at his shoulder And roses in his hair".

Officers who have not previously attended The Royal Regiment of Fusiliers Officers' Mess Minden Day dinner are presented with a rose to be eaten. The names of those who have done so are then recorded in the Mess Records.

== See also ==
- Great Britain in the Seven Years' War
- Oak Apple Day
- Saint Crispin's Day
- Trafalgar Day
