= Military career of Hubert Gough (1916) =

Series of articles on the British WW1 General

Sir Hubert de la Poer Gough
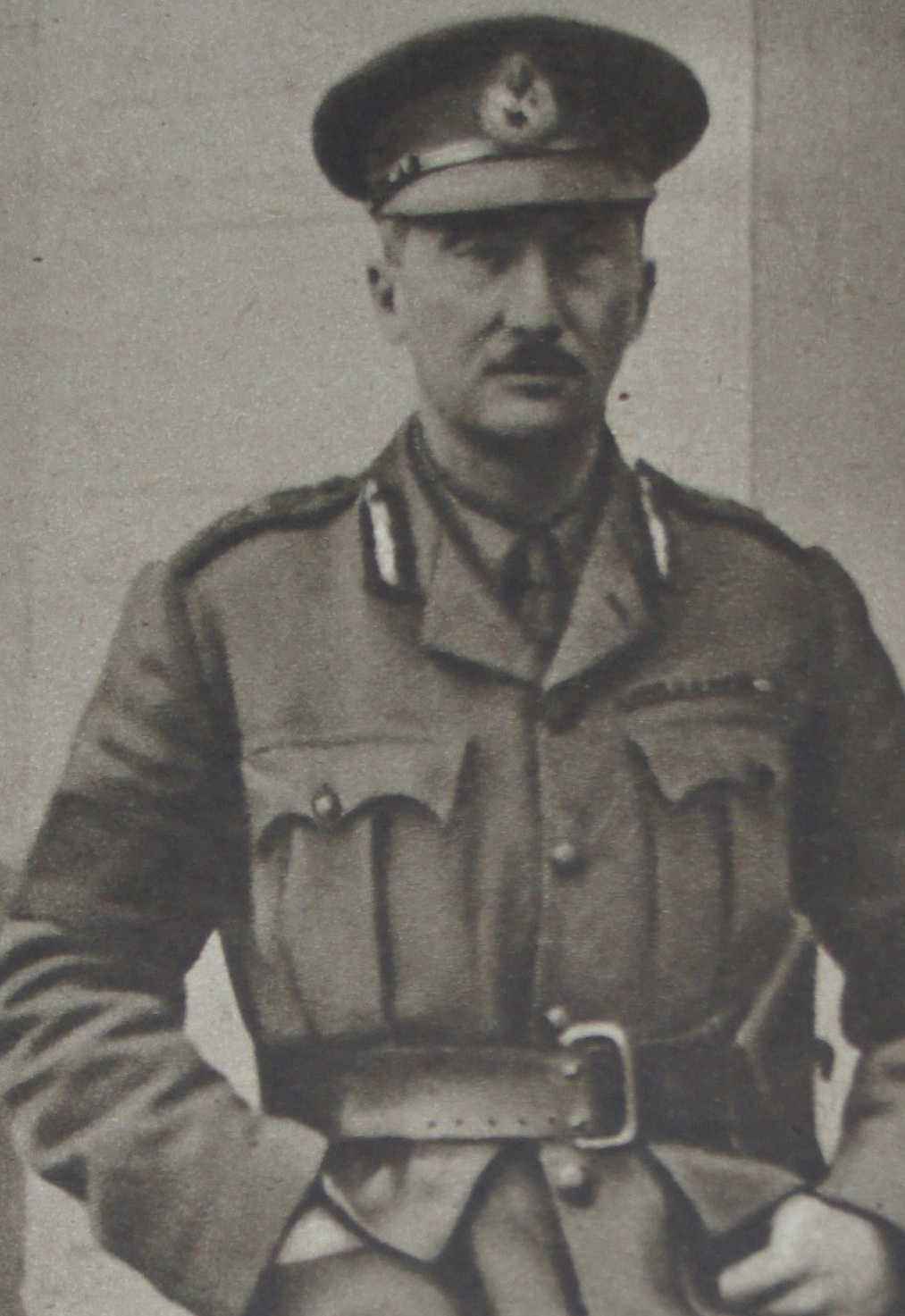
- Hubert Gough in 1917
- Born: 12 August 1870; London, England
- Died: 18 March 1963 (aged 92); London, England
- Burial place: Camberley, Surrey, England
- Relatives: Sir Charles Gough (father); Sir Hugh Gough (uncle); Sir John Gough (brother)
- Military career
- Allegiance: United Kingdom
- Branch: British Army
- Service years: 1888–1922
- Rank: General
- Commands: Fifth Army; I Corps; 7th Division; 3rd Cavalry Brigade; 16th (Queen's) Lancers
- Conflicts: Tirah Campaign; Second Boer War: Siege of Ladysmith; Relief of Ladysmith; First World War: Battle of Loos; Battle of the Somme; Third Battle of Ypres; Operation Michael
- Awards: Knight Grand Cross of the Order of the Bath; Knight Grand Cross of the Order of St Michael and St George; Knight Commander of the Royal Victorian Order

General Sir Hubert de la Poer Gough GCB, GCMG, KCVO (/ɡɒf/ GOF; 12 August 1870 – 18 March 1963) was a senior officer in the British Army in the First World War. A controversial figure, he was a favourite of the Commander-in-Chief of the British Expeditionary Force (BEF) on the Western Front, Field Marshal Sir Douglas Haig, and the youngest of his Army commanders.

In 1916 Gough commanded the Reserve Corps, renamed the Reserve Army in April and renamed the Fifth Army in October during the Battle of the Somme. He was originally earmarked to command the exploitation forces, both infantry and cavalry, in the event of a decisive breakthrough being achieved, although he may also have been intended to command in Flanders in the event of British offensive efforts being switched to that sector.

After the First Day of the Somme he was placed in command of the hilly northern sector of the battlefield, tasked with capturing important defensive ground and drawing off German reserves from the main BEF effort by Rawlinson's Fourth Army. Gough's Army fought over Pozieres and Mouquet Farm in the summer, and in the autumn captured Thiepval and Schwaben Redoubt, both of which had been targets for the initial BEF attack on 1 July.

Fifth Army conducted the final attack of the Battle of the Somme, at Beaumont Hamel in cold and wet weather in November. This was authorised by Haig largely for political reasons, to appease the French and so that he could report a recent success at a conference at Chantilly. Haig and his chief of staff Launcelot Kiggell visited Gough several times beforehand to discuss the political considerations and to ensure that there was a reasonable prospect of success. The attack began well on 13 November, reflecting improvements in artillery tactics which had been made since July that year, but as with many offensives in the middle years of the war the following days were less successful. Throughout the Battle of the Somme Gough had added to his controversial reputation as an aggressive, domineering commander under whom many other generals found it difficult to serve.

== The Somme ==
=== Initial phases ===
==== Training cavalry ====
Haig originally wanted to launch an offensive in Flanders, and told Gough to be prepared to take I Corps, of which he was still GOC, up there for this offensive – Gough sent the painter Paul Maze, a member of his staff, to prepare sketches of the ground. Haig did not completely abandon his hopes for a Flanders Offensive, and as late as 30 June 1916 Aylmer Haldane noted in his diary that several corps commanders senior to Gough (Hew Fanshawe of V Corps, Fergusson of II Corps) were being removed, and speculated that this was to clear the way for Gough to command Second Army in Flanders.

Gough was appointed GOC Reserve Corps on 4 April 1916, which was to push through and exploit any breakthrough achieved at the Somme. Gough spent most of the next two months supervising the training of the cavalry divisions, including staff rides and tactical exercises. He was asked for his opinion on the battlefield conditions which would be necessary for massed cavalry to move through, and on the organisation needed to control such a force both behind the lines and after the breakthrough. His staff, initially run by Edward "Moses" Beddington, were initially an adjunct of Haig's GHQ. Beddington had to liaise with XIII and XV Corps (on the right of Rawlinson's Fourth Army) to draw up contingency plans in case "things went as we hoped for" and with Jacob, who was to be given command of II Corps, although it was not yet clear what divisions this would contain.

An officer recorded that "Goughie ... was in his element when ordering cavalry brigades around" while a major thought him "drunk with power" for sacking so many officers who were not up to scratch "yet the Chief [i.e. Haig] can see no wrong in him". By mid-June he was also supervising the training of the 1st Indian Cavalry Division and 2nd Indian Cavalry Division.

==== Plans for exploitation ====
Battle of the Somme 1 July – 18 November 1916

In May, after discussions with Rawlinson, Gough proposed that two brigades of cavalry should be used, one in the north and one in the south, to assist the infantry in the event of a German collapse. He also suggested (letter to the BEF chief of staff, Kiggell, 1 May 1916) that a further entire cavalry division should be used in the north to help roll up the enemy second line, but this was vetoed by Haig, who wrote in the margin of the document that the [high] ground was unsuitable for "masses of cavalry", and who ordered Gough to restrict himself to a brigade each in the Ancre Valley and at Montauban (near the north and south of the British positions respectively).

Reserve Corps was renamed Reserve Army on 22 May 1916, (a development described as "ominous" by Prior & Wilson) although technically still remaining part of Rawlinson's Fourth Army. In late June the plans were recast, despite the requirements of the Battle of Verdun causing a reduction in the planned French contribution to the offensive from 39 divisions to twelve. Instead of exploiting southeast to cover the flank of a French crossing of the Somme, Haig (memo to Rawlinson 16 June, Haig diary 21 June) now wrote that once Pozières Ridge was taken, "an effort should be made to push the cavalry through" and anticipated that Gough was to exploit northeast to Bapaume and then, once further reinforcements had moved up, turn north to Monchy to take the German Arras positions in "flank and reverse". (Arras is around 15 miles (24 km) from Bapaume). Jacob's II Corps was either to be under Gough or else to reinforce Allenby's Third Army (opposite Arras) directly.

Haig told Gough (Haig diary 27 June) he was "too inclined to aim at fighting a battle at Bapaume" but should instead be ready to push on, before the Germans had a chance to attack him from the North. He also rebuked Rawlinson for wanting his men to consolidate for an hour or so on the German last line rather than pushing on, and for not having decided which units Gough was to take command of. Haig would have preferred Gough to take command of the two left hand corps (VIII Corps and X Corps) at once (i.e. prior to the infantry attack) but instead, that evening, approved Rawlinson's plan for Gough to set up HQ at Albert as soon as the Pozières Heights had fallen and to push through with the Reserve Army.

By now Reserve Army had three infantry and three cavalry divisions. Research by Stephen Badsey among the surviving evidence suggests that the final plan was probably for Gough to commit 25th Division, followed by two of the three cavalry divisions, then the II Corps (three divisions) to exploit any breakthrough achieved in the initial attack.

Philip Howell wrote (30 July 1916) that Gough "became more and more optimistic as the day of the battle drew near". Wynne later wrote to the Official Historian James Edward Edmonds (in 1930) that even after the disaster on the northern part of the British front, on the First Day of the Somme Gough was "ultro (sic) optimistic" and promoted "far reaching" plans.

==== Battle of Albert ====
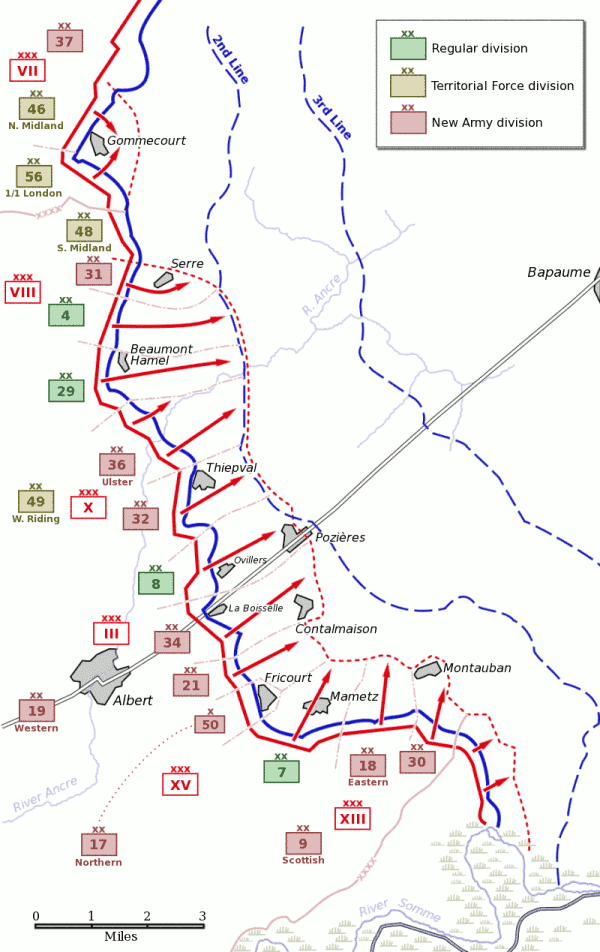
British objectives, Somme, 1 July 1916

On 1 July Gough visited Rawlinson twice in the morning. In the afternoon Haig, not yet aware of how badly the attack had gone in the northern sector and believing that Rawlinson was about to be able to push his reserves through, visited Gough and ordered him to "move up" in the evening. Gough visited Rawlinson for the third time in the afternoon but was told that there would be no breakthrough that day, so he ordered cavalry to return to billets. At 7 pm Rawlinson telephoned to give command of X and VIII Corps (the northern sector of the Somme front, where the worst losses and smallest gains had occurred on 1 July), with orders to "push them on again". Taking command on 2 July, Gough reported that VIII Corps communication trenches were blocked with dead and wounded troops and X Corps was found to be little better. In the early hours of 3 July, Rawlinson ordered Gough to renew the attack on his sector, orders which Haig then countermanded.

Gough was ordered to attack towards Schwaben Redoubt north of Thiepval (where British survivors of the assault on 1 July were believed to be holding out). However, despite the wishes of Haig and Rawlinson that he (in the words of the BEF chief of Staff Kiggell) "damp down his operations to the lowest level", Gough obtained permission to attack an enemy salient south-east of Thiepval, with elements of the 32nd Division and 49th Division. He ordered an attack by 14th and 75th brigades (under 32nd Division, part of X Corps). In the event he attacked with six battalions (fewer than two brigades), even though he thought the attack only a gamble with "prospects good enough to justify the attempt". The attacking units were not given time to prepare, orders were delayed in transmission, 32nd Division was ordered to attack over a frontage of 1,400 yards (1,300 m) rather than the 800 yards (730 m) planned, and the attack was delayed from 0315 to 0600, to coincide with a Fourth Army attack at Ovillers. The artillery, owing to communications difficulties, had already fired off half its stock of ammunition (although the Official History, contradicting itself, also states that Gough had agreed that this would be done deliberately). Sheffield describes the attack as "a complete shambles", although he comments that Gough was not entirely to blame and that it typified the "chaos" of British operations at that stage. Gough observed the attack and later claimed to have regretted having launched it. In the afternoon of 3 July, Reserve Army was formally made independent of Fourth Army.

Over the following months most of the shells and heavy artillery would be supporting Rawlinson's efforts, and although Gough was given extra guns later, he never had as many as Fourth Army. Whereas Reserve Army was allocated 14,000 18-pounder and 880 6-inch howitzer rounds daily in July, Fourth Army had 56,000 and 4,920 respectively. Haig's orders to Gough were to "sap", i.e. try to make small penetrations into the German lines to open them up to flanking attacks. Kiggell wrote Gough a memo (4 July) making plain that Reserve Army's role was to assist Rawlinson's attacks, by pinning down German reserves and that he was to keep within the quantity of shells which he was given. In July Gough believed that frequent attacks "in modest numbers" would keep casualties low, by keeping the Germans "off balance" and so ruling out the need or another "massive assault" on the lines of 1 July – this was a mistaken view, as small narrow-front attacks allowed the Germans to concentrate their fire, so contributing to the massive British losses of that month.

Gough was promoted temporary general on 7 July 1916.

Reserve Army took Ovillers on 16 July. In July Jacob's II Corps replaced X Corps in the line as Gough thought Thomas Morland (GOC X Corps) slow and overly cautious.

=== Summer ===
==== Pozières ====
The events of 1 July had shown that the German positions on VIII Corps sector and much of X Corps sector as well, were too strong to attack frontally. Gough's efforts until early September consisted of attacks by two divisions of X Corps, later assisted by the newly arrived II Corps, assisting Rawlinson's left flank. On only two occasions before 3 September were efforts coordinated with that of the Fourth Army and one of those (22/23 July) by accident.

On 15 July, the day after the Fourth Army success at the Battle of Bazentin Ridge, Haig envisaged Gough exploiting up the Ancre valley, to attack the enemy on Third Army's front (to Gough's north) from the south. The Pozières sector was handed over from Rawlinson to Gough on 15 July, making the Albert–Bapaume Road the boundary between the two armies. When Fourth Army's attacks again ran out of steam, Haig ordered Gough (18 July) to prepare for "methodical operations against Pozières ... with as little delay as possible", to capture the summit of Thiepval Ridge and cover the left flank of Fourth Army's advance. Haig sent some fresh divisions to X Corps and also deployed 1 ANZAC Corps, newly arrived on the Western Front, opposite Pozières. This was the most important attack yet expected of Gough.

Gough had to be dissuaded from launching 1st Australian Division against Pozières at 24 hours notice. Charles Bean, the Australian Official Historian, later wrote that on 18 July Maj-Gen "Hooky" Walker, the British officer commanding 1st Australian Division, had been ordered to attack Pozières the following night. Walker was appalled by these "scrappy & unsatisfactory orders from Reserve Army", later recording in his diary his concerns that he would be "rushed into an ill-prepared ... operation". I ANZAC Corps HQ had not yet arrived on the Somme and Walker, with "the sweat on (his) brow", argued with Gough, as did his chief of staff Brudenell White, until Gough gave in. Walker later wrote (in 1928) that the incident was "the very worst exhibition of Army commandship that occurred during the whole campaign, though God knows the 5th Army [as Reserve Army was later designated] was a tragedy throughout". Walker later wrote of how he had had to demand extra artillery, and only obtained permission to attack from the south east rather than the south west (the direction of previous unsuccessful attacks) as Gough wanted after taking Edward "Moses" Beddington, a staff officer whom Gough trusted, with him to reconnoitre the position. Haig advised Gough (20 July) to "go into all the difficulties carefully", as that division had not fought in France before. Gough defended the ANZACs to Haig against "tittle-tattle" at GHQ by officers who had "no idea of the real worth of the Australians". Gough later claimed (letter to Edmonds in 1939) he had given Walker no choice but had himself ordered the change in the direction of the attack.

The attack was delayed until 12:30 am on the night of 22/23 July and Pozières was taken, partly as a result of planning and partly as tired German troops were in the process of being relieved by fresh troops. The fall of Pozières on 22/23 July was the most successful part of a Big Push involving eight divisions, spread across five corps, from Pozières on the left to Guillemont on Rawlinson's right (Rawlinson had decided to push ahead without the French after they had requested a postponement of their part of the offensive). After German counterattacks had failed, the Germans then subjected the village to several weeks of severe shelling.

==== Clashes with subordinates ====
Gough used his corps as "postboxes", whereas Rawlinson was more tolerant of debate and discussion. Gough was reluctant to allow corps their normal role of control of artillery (he centralised artillery at Army level under Brigadier-General Tancred) and in planning operations. A memo of 16 July ordered that all points for bombardment by heavy howitzers must be selected at corps-level, and then, four days later, he ordered that after any bombardment, at whatever level it had been requested, daily reports were to be submitted to Army HQ. Neill Malcolm (Chief of Staff Reserve Army) recorded several instances in his diary (6 July, 13 July, 18 July) of corps commanders chafing at his "interference". Before coming under Gough's command, Hunter-Weston (GOC VIII Corps) wrote to his wife (1 July) of his personal liking for Gough – by 3 August he wrote to her that his staff were glad to be moving to the Second Army at Ypres, that Reserve Army staff had not run smoothly and that although he liked Gough and thought him "a good soldier ... he is hardly a big minded enough man to make a really good Army Commander". He also complained of Gough's "impetuosity" and "optimism".

Gough also clashed badly with Philip Howell, Chief of Staff of II Corps. Howell thought Gough "very loveable in many ways", if perhaps not quite sane, and "really quite a child & can be managed like one if treated as such & humoured". By 24 July 1916 Howell was writing that Gough and Malcolm had "managed to put everybody's back up" and throughout August 1916 complained repeatedly about Army-level micromanagement, with Reserve Army allegedly even taking direct control of four of 12th Division machine guns during an attack on 2 August. Philip Howell claimed (29 August 1916) that Jacob (II Corps), Percival (49th Division) and even Neill Malcolm (!) were terrified of Gough. Gough thought Howell a "great thorn" who spent much time "trying to argue", avoiding fighting and disobeying orders. Howell was killed by shellfire in September.

Gough also clashed with Cavan (XIV Corps) (3 August). Gough's attempts to micro-manage had little effect on the strong-minded Cavan.

==== Mouquet Farm ====
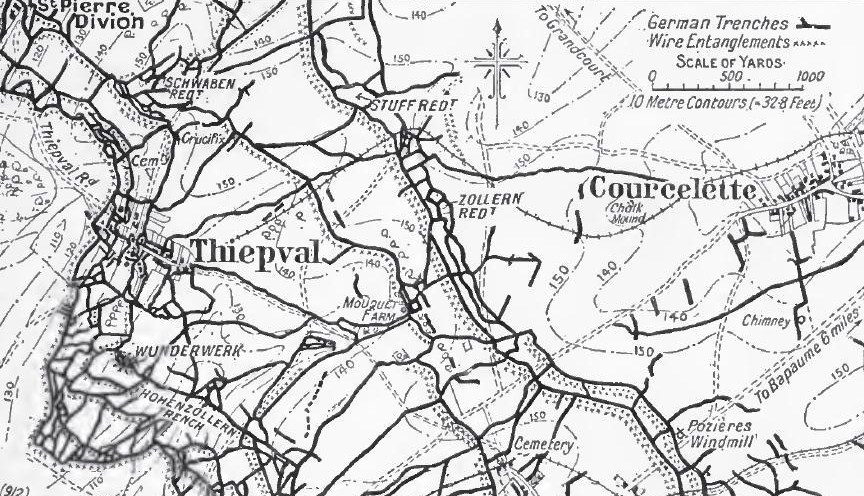
Map showing Mouquet Farm and the German defensive fortifications from Thiepval to Courcelette, July 1916

Gough ordered further attacks to seize the German OG1 and OG2 trenches north of Pozières, and to take Mouquet Farm (which lies approximately between Pozières and Thiepval). The first attack, by tired troops in the dark, failed. 1st Australian Division were withdrawn on 25 July and replaced by 2nd Australian Division. Sheffield & Todman argue that Gough's "direct operational control" of 2nd Australian Division on 29 July contributed to the failure of that attack, as Gough pressured Maj-Gen Legge to attack before preparations were complete. The German positions were on a reverse slope, so wire and machine gun positions could not be destroyed by bombardment. Bean blamed Legge for not standing up to Gough, and wrote that Brudenell White blamed himself for not doing so, although Sheffield argues that this is not entirely fair, as Legge, a "colonial", should have had more support from Corps level.

By the end of July it was clear that the Germans were not about to crumble as Haig had hoped, and on 2 August he ordered Reserve Army to conduct methodical attacks in the area from Pozières to Mouquet Farm and Ovillers, as economically with men and munitions as possible, so as to draw in German reserves and thus assist with Rawlinson's attacks on Gough's right flank. Haig recorded (diary 3 August) that Gough had demanded "reasons in writing" from Legge, after the failure of the Australian attack. Gough had written to Birdwood (1 ANZAC Corps Commander) demanding an explanation and asking if the attack would have succeeded given "greater energy and foresight on the part of the higher commanders". Birdwood refused to pass this note on to Legge as he thought it was "essential to give (him) a fair trial". Legge's second attack on Mouquet Farm, was better planned and succeeded on 4 August.

Gough now planned to capture Thiepval by converging attacks by the ANZACs from the east and by II Corps to the south west. This meant that the ANZACs had to attack along the crest of Thiepval Ridge, facing German fire from west, north and east. These attacks were often small in scale and were often not coordinated with II Corps attacks, let alone with Fourth Army, allowing the Germans – who knew the BEF plan from captured documents – a chance to concentrate their fire on the attackers.

Gough almost pushed Maj-Gen Robert Fanshawe (48th Division) (25 August) to the point of resignation. Gough complained to Haig (Haig diary 29 August) that "the Commanders of the Australians are becoming less offensive in spirit! The men are all right...." In over a month of fighting II Corps and I ANZAC Corps advanced 0.5-mile (0.8 km) towards Mouquet Farm and Thiepval. The BEF (not just ANZACs but also the 12th, 25th, 48th divisions and the Canadian Corps) suffered approximately 20,000 casualties in these attacks from 7 August to 12 September. The ANZACs had suffered 23,000 casualties in six weeks, a similar loss to what they had endured in eight months at Gallipoli.

Prior & Wilson criticised Gough for his responsibility for what they called "the Mouquet Farm fiasco", not least because at some point in September (documentary evidence of the exact date has not been found) Gough had changed his mind and decided to attack Thiepval solely from the (west) front, rather than trying to outflank it via Mouquet Farm. Philpott believes that although Haig's instructions were "confusing and contradictory", Gough (and Rawlinson) share some responsibility for the costly nature of these small piecemeal attacks, whose supposed aim was to "wear down" the Germans, prior to the decisive breakthrough which Haig was hoping to achieve in September. In August, clearly still hopeful that decisive victory could be attained on the Somme, Gough wrote to one of his nephews: "We are breaking in bit by bit and we must not stop until we have made the gap. It would be terrible to ask our men to begin their attacks all over again on fresh defences next year."

=== Autumn ===
==== Initial attack on Thiepval ====
A conference was held on 23 August to plan the attack on Thiepval, and the V Corps Chief of Staff (Brig-Gen Boyd) later brushed aside the GOC 6th Division's objections that an afternoon attack was unwise. The next day detailed plans for each division's attack were issued not at corps level but by Reserve Army.

3 September saw an attack by four divisions of Reserve Army from Pozières to the Ancre valley, simultaneously with an attack by Fourth Army. V Corps, extending Reserve Army operations into the Ancre valley for the first time, attacked towards St Pierre Divion and Schwaben Redoubt (north of Thiepval) to attack Thiepval from the north. II Corps (48th and 25th Divisions, moved up in mid-August) attacked Thiepval. These attacks failed. 4th Australian Division gained part of Fabeck Graben Redoubt north of Mouquet Farm, which was then lost by the Canadian Corps when it relieved 1 ANZAC Corps in the line.

The attack by 39th and 49th divisions (part of II Corps) failed, with some battalions taking between 30% and 50% casualties. Gough attributed the failure to lack of "martial qualities", lack of "discipline and motivation", "ignorance on the part of the Commanding officers" and "poor spirit in the men", to which Claud Jacob, GOC II Corps, added "want of direction", "stage fright", and cowardice on the part of the brigadier, while also commenting adversely on the lack of casualties among the commanding officers. V Corps, at Reserve Army's insistence, sent a detailed critique of the operation to 39th Division. However, Gough took responsibility for not having cancelled the operation when it was clear surprise had been lost. For the third time during the war he had lost an ADC wounded next to him as he observed attacks.

==== Assisting Rawlinson's offensive ====
Gough had submitted (28 August) an ambitious plan for the capture of Courcelette on his right flank. This was rejected by the BEF chief of staff Launcelot Kiggell, who told him that he was to continue to conduct limited operations to assist Rawlinson with the Battle of Flers–Courcelette, the next Fourth Army attack, which, if successful, would enable Rawlinson to attack Thiepval (on Gough's front) from the rear. In the event Haig changed his mind at the last moment.

Two days before Flers–Courcelette, Haig (13 September) – over Rawlinson's objections (Rawlinson diary 14 September) – ordered an attack on Martinpuich (Rawlinson's left flank) and an attack by 2nd and 3rd Canadian divisions on Courcelette (Gough's right flank) with a view to opening a gap which could be exploited by cavalry. Haig also urged Gough and Rawlinson (separately) not to neglect any opportunity to put the cavalry through, the ultimate aim being to take the Germans facing the Third Army to Gough's north, and even the First Army north of that, from the rear. II and V Corps were also to make feint attacks at Thiepval. The Canadian assault on Courcelette was a great success. Gough wrote (to his brother Johnnie's widow Dorothea, 23 September 1916) that many corps and division commanders were "incompetent" and that "considerable exercise of firmness" was needed to get them to obey orders.

==== Thiepval Ridge ====
After the Battle of Flers-Courcelette (15 September), Haig, perhaps believing a decisive breakthrough to be imminent, initially envisaged Gough attacking Thiepval, together with further attacks by Fourth Army and by the French further south – an attack by ten divisions in total.

Gough's plan was for 18th Division to capture Thiepval and Schwaben Redoubt, 11th Division to capture Mouquet Farm and Zollern and Stuff Redoubts (roughly north of Mouquet Farm) while on the right 1st and 2nd Canadian Divisions were to attack from Courcelette to Regina Trench which lay just beyond the ridge line. Gough allocated all seven of his tanks (five of which broke down before reaching the lines) to the Canadians.

The preliminary bombardment began on 23 September. This was the heaviest barrage yet fired by Reserve Army, assisted by an indirect machine gun barrage into the German rear areas. Gough had 570 field guns and 270 howitzers to attack along a 6,000-yard (5,500 m) front (roughly twice the concentration of 1 July, but only half that which Rawlinson had had at the Battle of Bazentin Ridge on 14 July and much the same as that of the Battle of Flers–Courcelette on15 September. Allenby's Third Army was to co-operate with an attack on Gough's left flank (Haig diary 24 September and 30 September).

In the event poor weather delayed the attacks until the early afternoon of 25 September. As Gough planned to use a few tanks to assist his attack, Haig ordered him to delay until the following morning when they could be concealed in the morning mist but in the event further delays, for which the reason is unclear, meant that Gough attacked at 12:35 pm on 26 September, exactly a day after Rawlinson and Foch's French forces.

Four divisions of Canadian and II Corps attacked between Courcelette and Schwaben. The Battle of Thiepval Ridge was Gough's most ambitious operation to date. The attack of 26 September showed the improvement in British tactics. Mouquet Farm at last fell in the afternoon. On the western sector, lodgements were gained in Zollern, Stuff and Schwaben redoubts and British forces pushed to the edge of St Pierre Divion. Thiepval was surrounded and captured by Maxse's highly trained 18th Division by 08.30 on 27 September. By 30 September, after fierce hand-to-hand fighting in which the British suffered 12,500 casualties, 5 square miles (13 km^{2}) had been gained, an advance of between 1,000–2,000 yards (910–1,830 m). Regina Trench and parts of Stuff and Schwaben Redoubts remained in German hands. This fighting demonstrated that, either attacking German positions with proper artillery support, or in hand-to-hand fighting in which artillery support mattered little, British volunteer infantry could fight as well as the Germans. The same would prove true in November. Gough's capture of Thiepval (an original objective for 1 July) preserved his status with commander-in-chief.

==== Tactical ideas ====
A 5 October 1916 memo (over Neill Malcolm's signature) bypassing corps commanders and issued directly for the guidance of division and brigade commanders, sheds light on Gough's tactical thinking. Although he understood the importance of the creeping barrage and of mopping-up parties, he was – unlike Rawlinson – uninterested in bite and hold tactics and tended to feel that opportunities would be lost if infantry were obliged to stop at a predetermined point to stick to an artillery plan.

He recommended aiming for deep advances into enemy positions, with troops attacking up to five consecutive preassigned objectives, with waves aiming for predetermined objectives in a conveyor-belt approach. Each brigade was to attack in up to eight "waves": two battalions, making up the first four waves, were to take the first objective and another two battalions, perhaps deployed in columns for speed of movement, would then take the second, with no battalions held in brigade-level reserve (the argument being that orders would never reach them in time). He recommended that each division attack with two brigades and hold a third brigade in reserve, ready to take the third objective, by which time the first two brigades would have been reorganised to take the fourth objective. The fifth objective would require fresh troops.

He wanted commanders to keep as far forward as possible, even if it was not possible to keep in contact with their superiors by telephone, in order not to have to waste time sending junior officers forward to reconnoitre and report back. The brigade commander was to stay forward so that while the second objective was being assaulted they could reorganise the troops who had just taken the first objective, so that they could take the third. Divisional commanders were also urged to stay forward so that they could reorganise the attacking brigades so as to create their own reserve. Simpson comments that corps would have the benefit of RFC patrols to keep in touch, but their own reserves would be too far back to be of use, while heavy artillery controlled at corps level would be more important for counterbattery work and for the preliminary bombardment, rather than being needed during the infantry assault. Simpson also comments that all this was very similar to VIII Corps views prior to 1 July attacks, and that Reserve Army's attacks in October were to be little more successful, although weather and mud made Gough's task more difficult. Although it is true that opportunities for advance sometimes went begging for lack of initiative (e.g. at Bazentin Ridge on 14 July 1916), Sheffield argues that Gough was overly focussed on infantry rather than artillery tactics, and was demanding too much from his men.

Gough agreed with Haig's suggestion (Haig diary 8 October) that "the deterioration of the Enemy's fighting qualities" meant that it was not necessary for British troops to be protected by a barrage once they had captured an enemy position, as this would hamper reserves from pushing on to the next objective. General Bridges later wrote (in "Alarms and Excursions") that "With the true cavalry spirit, (Gough) was always for pushing on". Rawlinson (diary 9 October) recorded his concerns at Gough's "hourush tactics and no reserves, as they are not sound".

The fighting at Thiepval went on until November and was later criticised by the Official Historian for lack of co-ordination and excessive reliance on infantry elan.

==== Battle of the Ancre Heights ====
The Battle of the Ancre Heights (1 October – 11 November) was conducted further to the left of Gough's sector. Haig issued orders (29 September) for further advances by Reserve and Fourth Armies. Gough was to attack Loupart Wood from the south and Beaumont Hamel from the west. The plan was for Reserve Army to advance 5 miles (8.0 km) and capture more ground in one battle than in three months of campaigning.

On 8 October, the 1st and 3rd Canadian divisions, on Gough's right flank, assisted another of Rawlinson's offensives by attacking unsuccessfully towards Le Sars and Regina Trench, only to be held up by German wire. Speaking to Haig that afternoon, Gough blamed the 3rd Canadian Division, claiming that in some cases they had not even left their trenches. Stuff Redoubt fell (9 October) to a battalion of 25th Division. Schwaben Redoubt was attacked unsuccessfully (9 October) in a surprise night attack with no barrage, then successfully on 14 October after a two-day bombardment. These costly penny-packet attacks sometimes involved little more than a single battalion. A big German counterattack was then repulsed. By this time Gough was discussing with Haig the possibility that the war might go on into 1917, requiring fresh offensives.

After two weeks of rain had rendered plans for exploitation unrealistic, Gough issued a new, more cautious plan (15 October), in which 45 tanks were to be used, although he was still under pressure from Haig to exploit to the north and north-east. Stuff and Regina Trenches (which ran approximately west–east north of a line from Thiepval to Courcelette) were then captured in a major attack by 35th, 25th, 18th and 4th Canadian divisions, completing the capture of the Ancre Heights. The battle testified to the revived German defence after their panic of September.

Wilson, whom Gough had disliked since the Curragh incident, commanded IV Corps first alongside then under Gough in 1916. Wilson commented in his diary (21 October) on reports of Gough micro-managing divisions and even brigades. That autumn Lord Loch told Wilson "Goughie is the best hated & most useless & most dangerous General we have got".

After the success of 21 October, Gough once again presented more ambitious plans, with Haig offering (24 October) to place an extra two cavalry divisions (for three in total) at his disposal – this at a time when even quite minor infantry attacks on Fourth Army sector were having to be cancelled because of mud. Haig cautioned Gough to wait for three days of fine weather (26 October) before attacking again. Gough complained that Brigadier-General Radcliffe (chief of staff, Canadian Corps) "made unnecessary difficulties" (Haig Diary 30 October 1916).

Reserve Army was redesignated Fifth Army on 30 October 1916.

=== The Ancre ===
==== Political considerations ====
Gough fought the last major British attack on the Somme at the Ancre, beginning on 13 November. This was "perhaps Gough's finest hour as an offensive general", although a large part of its success was owed to delays because of the weather, which gave more time for planning and preparation and which forced the original plans (drawn up by GHQ in October) to be scaled back. Haig urged Gough (2 and 6 November) to wait for dry weather before proceeding. After continuous rain between 24 October and 3 November, Fifth Army was ordered (5 November) to conduct only a "limited" attack and authorised to wait until the weather was good enough.

Haig sent Kiggell (Chief of Staff BEF) to Gough's HQ (8 November) to explain the motivation for the attack, although Kiggell stressed that Haig did not want the attack to proceed unless there were good prospects of success. The aim was to pin down German troops which might otherwise have been sent to Romania, to impress on the Russians that the BEF was still fighting, as well as strengthening Haig's hand in the inter-Allied conference due to start at Chantilly on 15 November, at which the possible transfer of Western Allied troops to Salonika was to be discussed. Gough later recorded that the first murmurings against Haig's leadership were beginning to be heard in London. Simkins suggests that Haig wanted to be able to blame Gough if the Ancre attack went wrong but take the credit if it succeeded.

Gough then consulted his corps commanders (10 November): Jacob (II Corps) was persuaded to try for deeper objectives as Fanshawe (V Corps) and Congreve (XIII Corps) wanted. The attack was agreed for 13 November. Staff officers and patrols inspected the ground and Gough (10–11 November) visited six divisional commanders and ten brigadiers, also seeing two battalion commanders at each brigade headquarters. He had asked his corps commanders to make similar inquiries. He found no consensus as to whether or not the ground was dry enough. The start time was set for 5:45 am after further consultations with Jacob, Fanshawe and divisional commanders.

Kiggell again visited Gough on 12 November – Gough later wrote (in The Fifth Army) of how any further delay would have had a bad effect on troop morale, and how after four dry days the prospects were as good as they were likely to be that winter, and of how he had sat looking out of the window turning over the decision in his mind after Kiggell had "gravely elaborated the great issues at stake" – that afternoon Haig also visited him and gave him the go-ahead (Haig wrote in his diary that "a success at this time was much wanted" and "I am ready to run reasonable risks ... (but given) the difficulties of ground and weather. Nothing is as costly as failure!")

Sheffield comments that this sequence of events indicates that Haig enjoyed warmer relations with Gough than with, say, Rawlinson, but also suggests that he felt the need to supervise him closely. He also comments that although Gough consulted his subordinates, it is unclear that he took their advice: Simon Robbins quotes evidence of warnings from some corps, division and brigade staffs that troops were exhausted and conditions too poor to attack. Neill Malcolm's Memorandum on Operations (13 November 1916) recorded the political reasons for the attack.

==== Initial success ====
The Ancre attack employed 282 heavy guns and a creeping barrage, over an area which had not been heavily fought over so far, thus allowing men and guns to be moved more easily over relatively undisturbed ground. The volume of shells exceeded that put on the entire enemy line on 1 July. After a seven-day preliminary bombardment, 13 November saw an attack by 5 divisions, with 2 brigades on the flanks, the largest British attack since September. Lessons were also learned from previous battles: a mine was blown at Beaumont Hamel, simultaneously with the commencement of the artillery barrage, far more successfully than the mine which had been blown in the same area 10 minutes prior to the infantry assault on 1 July.

The attack began at 5:45 am, behind an effective creeping barrage, with the German machine guns on the crest behind Beaumont Hamel completely suppressed by 40 guns specifically given this task. The attack succeeded in the southern sector, where the 63rd Royal Naval Division took Beaucourt by 10:45 am, albeit with some attacking battalions taking 40–50% casualties, and the 51st Highland Division took Beaumont Hamel and St Pierre Divion, where the French practice was adopted of assigning a 4.5 inch howitzer to shell the entrance of each German dugout until the "mopping-up" platoons had reached them. However, further north in V Corps sector the attack on Serre was less successful because of mud and uncut wire, despite Gough visiting the sector at 2 pm to order further attacks. Those who fought at Beaumont Hamel thought it had been well-planned. Haig wrote in his diary (13 November) "the success has come at a most opportune moment".

Gough ordered further attacks the next day (14 November), leading to the vicious local struggles for Munich and Frankfort Trenches. When he learned of this, Haig telephoned from Paris that he did not want any further attacks "on a large scale" until his return from the conference, but this news did not reach Gough until 9 am on 15 November, when the attack was about to begin, and after consulting his corps commanders Gough decided to proceed, a decision which Haig approved retrospectively that afternoon. Sheffield writes that these attacks "bore a distinct resemblance to the narrow-fronted, penny-packet attacks around Pozières and elsewhere in the summer, with the added complication of appalling weather."

Brigadier-General Home of the Cavalry Corps noted (15 November) that the rumours that Gough was to be promoted to Commander-in-Chief in Haig's place were "too comic as I don't think they could ever make him do what they wanted".

==== Final stages ====
After the first attempt to take Munich and Frankfort trenches (15 November) failed, the commanders of 2nd and 51st Divisions were asked for detailed reports. Maj-Gen George Harper (GOC 51st Division) blamed the slowness of the creeping barrage, which caused his "impetuous" men to suffer casualties from friendly fire, and the fact that the attack had not been "under one command". Maj-Gen W.G. Walker (GOC 2nd Division) commented that the attack had been too hurried, as his troops had not been familiar with the ground, and that Fanshawe (GOC V Corps) had rejected his requests for a delay and for a daylight attack. Gough forced 2nd Division to attack for two consecutive days despite protests from its commander (Walker) and chief of staff that the ground was impassable.

Malcolm issued a confidential memo to Corps Commanders (16 November) complaining about their tendency to query and argue about orders. Another Memorandum on Future Operations (16 November) discusses Fanshawe's wish to attack because of "a serious break on his front". Fanshawe held a conference of division commanders (16 November) to discuss the troop and barrage requirements for a renewed attempt.

George Jeffreys later testified that the GOC of 19th Division had complained of the difficulties of attacking at Grandcourt and Gough and his staff "had simply no conception of conditions in the forward area". Gough later demanded to know why that division had not left 58th Brigade in the line for a further 24 hours, which "show(ed) ... that he had no notion of the physical strain on the troops of even a few hours in the line under such conditions".

The first snow of the winter fell on 18 November. The attacks on 18 November suffered around 10,000 casualties. One officer of II Corps later wrote to Edmonds (in 1936) that it had been a "cruel useless sacrifice of life" with men dead from exhaustion in trying to crawl out of the mud, and that given the weather it was obvious "to the very stupidest brain that no success could possibly result". Haig called off the battle. Kiggell later wrote to Edmonds (in 1938) "the later stages of the fight were hardly justified, but Gough was so keen and confident the C-in-C decided to permit them".

A few days later 32nd Division relieved 2nd Division in the line, and their attack would also fail, partly as a result of inaccurate bombardment as 2nd Division staff had not been able to give them an accurate description of where the front line actually was. Gough exercised almost personal control of 32nd Division in fighting for Frankfort Trench from 18 November onwards. The GOC W.H. Rycroft was apprehensive of Gough because of the failure of 3 July and was said by his GSO1 (chief of staff), the future Maj-Gen Wace, to be "terrified of Gough" and on learning in October 1916 that his division was returning to the Somme had remarked "wryly that it would be his undoing unless we went to Rawly's Army", however "lack(ed) the kick in him to stand up to Gough, when all initiative was taken out of his hands". Wace later testified to Edmonds (in 1936) that during the planning for the Ancre orders came down, via Corps, as being very clearly the Army Commander's decision. Rycroft only received the orders at 9:45 pm the night before and called it "another of Gough's mad ideas", and was simply told what orders he was to issue, even for the location of Advanced Brigade Headquarters. After the attack failed Gough sacked up to seven senior officers of 32nd Division, including Rycroft and two brigadiers, one of whom was Jenkins, GOC 75th Brigade.

Gough rebuked Fanshawe in writing (21 November) for lack of grip, and for failing to issue detailed written artillery orders, during 15 November attack. On his copy of the report, against the comment that copies of Gough's remarks were to be sent to the two divisional commanders, Fanshawe wrote "I hope not all of them" and protested in the margin that he had been in telephone contact with divisions throughout. Simpson criticises Gough for his "poor reasoning and indifference to the views of the men on the spot", although he is also critical of Fanshawe for attempting to blame his own subordinates. Sheffield writes "Some of Gough's points were fair, if harshly expressed, but others were not; some were based on factual inaccuracies. All this suggests a commander who had an incomplete grasp of the realities of the battle." He also remarks on Gough's deliberate humiliation of Fanshawe in front of the latter's subordinates. Walker was relieved of command of 2nd Division on 27 December.

Gough was awarded the KCB in 1916.

=== Gough and the BEF's "learning curve" ===
Gough practised top-down command to a degree which was unusual in the British Army of that era, with its culture, evolved in an army designed for fighting small colonial wars, of leaving decisions to "the man on the spot". Andy Simpson argues that although Gough's command methods were clearly more prescriptive than those of Rawlinson's Fourth Army, in which a 20-page summary of division commanders' views was circulated in late August, given Rawlinson's lack of grip this was not necessarily a bad thing. Simpson argues that Gough's hands-on control may have been at Haig's urging, given Haig's dissatisfaction with Rawlinson, and suggests that this may also have been a factor in Gough being employed in major offensives in 1917, whereas Rawlinson was not. Michael Howard cited Gough's love of micro-managing divisions as evidence that he had been overpromoted, and Gary Sheffield concedes that Gough's reputation for touring the trenches to spot dirty rifles suggests that he had found it hard to adapt to his greater responsibilities.

Sheffield argues that Gough's behaviour was to some extent an attempt to answer the dilemma noted by Malcolm (diary 29 June 1916). Malcolm believed that a "happy medium" had been attained between Army maintaining control of operations and delegating decision-making to the "man on the spot" as prescribed by Field Service Regulations. Sheffield describes that claim as "misplaced". The BEF had recently grown from 7 divisions to 70 – the Army had not anticipated or trained for the challenges of officers having to command large formations, nor for trench warfare, nor for the difficulties in communication (which would remain until battlefield radios came into use) involved. Officers' personalities, and how they related with one another, mattered a great deal in how they managed these changes. Part of Gough's concern at micromanaging plans may have been because he knew that once an attack had begun he would have little chance to influence the results.

Sheffield observes that Haig was himself grappling with the dilemma of the degree to which subordinates should be "gripped", and so often gave Gough unclear guidance. Gough himself also had a tendency to ignore orders from above when it suited him, the very tendency he abhorred in his own subordinates.

Some of Gough's ideas were adopted in other armies: Fourth Army's document Artillery Lessons of the Battle of the Somme (18 November) reflected Gough's prescriptive approach rather than the delegation encouraged under Field Service Regulations, or practised by Rawlinson during the Somme. On the other hand, the tactical manual SS144 The Normal Formation for the Attack (February 1917) was a compromise between Gough's view and the opposite view, that each infantry wave should take and consolidate just one objective, with fresh units being fed through to take deeper objectives.

== Works ==
- Gough, Hubert, The Fifth Army, London: Hodder, 1931
- Gough, Hubert, Soldiering On: Being the memoirs of Sir Hubert Gough, New York: Speller, 1957

Military offices
Preceded by Sir Thompson Capper	GOC 7th Division; April–July 1915	Succeeded by Sir Thompson Capper
Preceded by Charles Monro	GOC I Corps; 1915–1916	Succeeded by Arthur Holland
Preceded by None	GOC-in-C Fifth Army; 1916–1918	Succeeded by William Peyton
Honorary titles
Preceded by Edmund Allenby, 1st Viscount Allenby	Colonel of the 16th/5th Lancers; 1936–1943	Succeeded by Henry Cecil Lloyd Howard
