= General Fanshawe =

General Fanshawe may refer to:

- Edward Fanshawe (British Army officer) (1859–1952), British Army lieutenant general
- Evelyn Fanshawe (1895–1979), British Army major general
- Hew Dalrymple Fanshawe (1860–1957), British Army lieutenant general
- Robert Fanshawe (British Army officer) (1863–1946), British Army major general
