= Guilsborough House =

Country house in Guilsborough, Northamptonshire, England

Coordinates: 52.3486°N 1.0071°W

Guilsborough House is a country house in Guilsborough near Northampton, England. It is a Grade II listed building.

== History ==
The house was built in 1632 and was extended in the 18th century and the 19th century. In the 19th century it came into the ownership of the Renton family who were prominent in the village of Guilsborough.

In 1933, Captain Robert Treeck, a Baron and German agent, reporting directly to Hitler, had moved to England together with his Chilean mistress (later wife in 1938), Baroness Violetta Schroeders. He leased two properties: Luckington Manor in Wiltshire, and Guilsborough House, his main residence, where he entertained lavishly and rode with the Pytchley Hunt. In September 1939, Treeck vanished, and Guilsborough and its contents were placed under the control of the Custodian of Enemy Property.

During the Second World War the house was the headquarters of IV Corps until August 1940 when the corps moved to Latimer House near Chesham. It remained the headquarters of 9th Armoured Division and the 43rd Infantry Division which formed the central reserve force of the invasion stop lines. After the war the house became the home of Major-General Evelyn Fanshawe and it is now the property of Mr & Mrs John McCall who open the gardens to the public on selected days.

== Sources ==
- Newbold, David John. "British planning and preparations to resist invasion on land, September 1939 - September 1940". King's College, University of London.
