= Cameron Shute =

British Army general (1866–1936)

General Sir Cameron Shute KCB KCMG
- Born: 15 March 1866; Dorking, Surrey, England
- Died: 25 January 1936 (aged 69); London, England
- Military career
- Allegiance: United Kingdom
- Branch: British Army
- Service years: 1885–1931
- Rank: General
- Unit: First World War
- Commands: 2nd Battalion, Rifle Brigade (Prince Consort's Own); 59th Brigade; 63rd (Royal Naval) Division; 32nd Division; 19th (Western) Division; V Corps; 4th Division; Northern Command
- Awards: Knight Commander of the Order of the Bath; Knight Commander of the Order of St Michael and St George; Legion of Honour

General Sir Cameron Deane Shute, KCB, KCMG (15 March 1866 – 25 January 1936), was a senior British Army officer during the First World War.

== Early life and education ==
Cameron Deane Shute was born on 15 March 1866 in Dorking, Surrey, the son of Colonel Deane Christian Shute of the British Indian Army, and his wife, Elizabeth Isabella Brownlow. He was educated at Marlborough College and abroad. He was the nephew of General Sir Charles Cameron Shute (1816–1904). Francis Browne, 4th Baron Kilmaine married his sister Alice Emily Shute.

== Early military career ==
After graduating from the Royal Military College, Sandhurst, Shute was commissioned as a lieutenant into the Welsh Regiment (later the Welch Regiment) in August 1885.

He attended the Staff College, Camberley, from 1893 to 1894 and was again seconded for staff service in August 1898. He transferred to the Rifle Brigade (The Prince Consort's Own) in September 1895, receiving a promotion to captain in his new regiment, and participated in the Nile Expedition of 1898. He was deputy assistant adjutant general (DAAG) in Malta from 1899 and, a major from June 1904 onwards, a general staff officer (GSO) at Scottish Coast Defences from 1905.

In March 1910 he was promoted to lieutenant colonel and appointed commanding officer (CO) of the 2nd Battalion, Rifle Brigade, and, after being promoted to full colonel in June 1913, he then became a GSO at Aldershot Training Centre from 1914.

== First World War ==
He served in the First World War, becoming a GSO1 in August 1914, and later in France and Belgium, becoming commander of the 59th Infantry Brigade, 20th (Light) Division, in France during the Guillemont actions in 1915. Upon being made a temporary major general in October 1916 he went on to be general officer commanding (GOC) of the 63rd (Royal Naval) Division, the same year in which he was made a Companion of the Order of the Bath.

As GOC of the Royal Naval Division, Shute had an intense dislike of the division's unconventional "nautical" traditions and made numerous unpopular attempts to stamp them out. He was particularly critical of the poor management of the latrines which could have led to an outbreak of dysentery. Following a particularly critical inspection of the trenches by Shute, an officer of the division, Sub-lieutenant A. P. Herbert, who later became a famous humorous writer, legal satirist and member of Parliament, wrote a popular poem that summed up the feelings of the men of the division:

The General inspecting the trenches

Exclaimed with a horrified shout
'I refuse to command a division
Which leaves its excreta about.'

But nobody took any notice
No one was prepared to refute,
That the presence of shit was congenial
Compared to the presence of Shute.

And certain responsible critics
Made haste to reply to his words
Observing that his staff advisors
Consisted entirely of turds.

For shit may be shot at odd corners
And paper supplied there to suit,
But a shit would be shot without mourners
If somebody shot that shit Shute.

Although soldier songs hostile to superior officers were not rare, it is unusual to have a song aimed at a named officer.

He later became GOC of the 32nd Division in 1917 and of the 19th (Western) Division at the Battle of Messines (Flanders, Belgium) in 1917. In June 1917 he was promoted to the substantive rank of major general "for distinguished service in the Field".

In April 1918 he took command of V Corps in the place of the sacked Lieutenant General Sir Edward Fanshawe and was promoted to temporary lieutenant general as a result of his new appointment. In this role, he played a vital part in the so-called Hundred Days Offensive, the series of Allied victories that broke the German Army and brought about the Armistice with Germany which finally ended the war.

== Post-war years ==
After the war his CB was upgraded to a Knight Commander of the Order of the Bath (KCB) and in January 1919 he was awarded the French Legion of Honour. Having reverted to his permanent rank of major general in April 1919, and relinquished command of V Corps, he became GOC of the 4th Division, a post he held from November 1919 to November 1923.

After being made a substantive lieutenant general in April 1926, and succeeding General Sir Francis Davies as lieutenant of the Tower of London, he was general officer commanding-in-chief for Northern Command in 1927. Promoted to full general in March 1931, he retired from the army later on 15 May.

Military offices
Preceded by Edward Fanshawe	GOC V Corps; 1918–1919	Succeeded by Post disbanded
Preceded by Cuthbert Lucas	GOC 4th Division; 1919–1923	Succeeded by Reginald Stephens
Preceded by Sir Charles Harington	GOC-in-C Northern Command; 1927–1931	Succeeded by Sir John Gathorne-Hardy
Preceded by Sir Victor Couper	Colonel Commandant of the 1st Battalion, Rifle Brigade (The Prince Consort's Own); 1929–1936	Succeeded by Sir John Burnett-Stuart
