= Henry Heath (British Army officer) =

British Army general (1860–1915)

Major-General Henry Heath CB
- Born: 15 October 1860
- Died: 29 July 1915 (aged 54)
- Military career
- Allegiance: United Kingdom
- Branch: British Army
- Service years: 1881–1915
- Rank: Major-General
- Units: South Staffordshire Regiment; King's Own Yorkshire Light Infantry
- Commands: 11th Infantry Brigade; South Midland Division
- Conflicts: Anglo-Egyptian War; Nile Expedition; Second Boer War; First World War
- Awards: Companion of the Order of the Bath

Major-General Henry Newport Charles Heath CB (15 October 1860 – 29 July 1915) was a British Army general during the First World War, who commanded the 48th (South Midland) Division from 1914 to 1915.

== Early life and military career ==
Heath was born into a military family, the second surviving son of Major-General Alfred Heath, Royal Artillery. He attended Clifton College and the Royal Military College, Sandhurst, before joining the 1st Battalion, South Staffordshire Regiment as a lieutenant on 22 October 1881. He served in the 1882 Anglo-Egyptian War and the 1884-85 Nile Expedition, where he was mentioned in dispatches for his role at the Battle of Kirbekan.

He transferred into the 1st Battalion, King's Own Yorkshire Light Infantry in 1889, was promoted to captain on 6 February 1889 with a brevet rank of major the following day. He later attended the Staff College, Camberley from 1896 to 1897, and on leaving succeeded Captain The Hon. Herbert Lawrence, later a full general, as a staff captain in the intelligence department of the War Office in May 1898. He was promoted to the substantive rank of major on 27 August 1898.

He remained on the staff during the first part of the Second Boer War, as he was in November 1899 appointed assistant adjutant general and the chief staff officer for the lines of communication in South Africa. Mentioned in despatches, he received the brevet rank of lieutenant colonel on 29 November 1900. In October 1901 he returned to his regiment to command the 2nd Battalion, stationed in South Africa. Following the end of the Second Boer War in June 1902, he returned to the United Kingdom on board the SS Ortona, which arrived in Southampton in September that year. On arrival he transferred to the command of the 1st Battalion stationed at Aldershot Garrison, with the substantive rank of lieutenant colonel from 7 September 1902.

Heath's grave in Brookwood Cemetery.

Heath returned to the staff in June 1904, when he was promoted to colonel and succeeded Samuel Lomax as assistant adjutant general of the 2nd Army Corps. He was made the AAG of the 4th Division, then in February 1906 was posted to army headquarters, or the War Office, as an AAG and made GSO1 there in March 1908, taking over from Brevet Colonel Alexander Hamilton-Gordon. In June 1909 he was temporarily placed in command of the 11th Infantry Brigade and was granted the temporary rank of brigadier general while so employed.

In February 1910, after relinquishing this assignment, he was placed on half-pay. In July he succeeded Major General Thomas Snow as general officer commanding (GOC) of the 11th Infantry Brigade, then stationed at Colchester, Essex, and was once again granted the temporary rank of brigadier general while so employed (as, during this time, brigadier general was only a temporary rank). In December 1913, while still commanding the brigade, he was promoted to major general.

== First World War ==
At the outbreak of the First World War, Heath had recently relinquished command of the 11th Brigade to Brigadier General Aylmer Hunter-Weston. He was immediately given command of a newly mobilised Territorial division, the South Midland Division, and commanded it when it first went to France; however, in mid-June, he relinquished command after falling ill. He died shortly thereafter, on 29 July, aged 54 and was buried in Brookwood Cemetery in Woking.

== Notes ==
Military offices
Preceded by Edward Graham	GOC South Midland Division; 1914–1915	Succeeded by Robert Fanshawe
