= V Corps (United Kingdom) =

- Formation Sign of V Corps during the Second World War.
- Active: 1915–1919; 1940–1945
- Country: United Kingdom
- Branch: British Army
- Type: Corps
- Engagements: First World War: Battle of Hill 60; Second Battle of Ypres; Battle of Frezenberg Ridge; Battle of Bellewarde Ridge; Actions at The Bluff and St Eloi; Battle of the Somme (1916); Battle of the Ancre (1916); Operation Alberich; First and Second Battle of Bullecourt; Third Battle of Ypres; Battle of Cambrai (1917); First Battle of Bapaume; First Battle of Arras (1918); Battle of the Ancre (1918); Second Battle of the Somme (1918); Battles of the Hindenburg Line; Final Advance in Picardy; Second World War: Tunisia Campaign: Operation Torch; Italian Campaign: Allied invasion of Italy; Advance from the Sangro; Moro River Campaign; Adriatic Coast; Gothic Line; Spring 1945 offensive in Italy

Commanders
- Notable commanders: Sir Herbert Plumer; Sir Edmund Allenby; Hew Dalrymple Fanshawe; Sir Edward Fanshawe; Cameron Shute; Sir Claude Auchinleck; Sir Bernard Montgomery; Sir Edmond Schreiber; Sir Charles Allfrey; Sir Charles Keightley

Insignia
- Corps formation sign during the First World War.

V Corps was an army corps of the British Army that saw service in both the First and the Second World Wars. It was first organised in February 1915 and fought through the First World War on the Western front. It was recreated in June 1940, during the Second World War and was substantially reorganised in 1942 for participation in Operation Torch. It fought through the Tunisia Campaign and later the Italian Campaign.

== Prior to the First World War ==
In 1876, a Mobilisation Scheme for the forces in Great Britain and Ireland, including eight army corps of the 'Active Army', was published. The '5th Corps' was headquartered at Salisbury comprising the units of Southern Command. In 1880, its order of battle was as follows:

- 1st Division (Salisbury)
  - 1st Brigade (Salisbury)
    - 1st Bn. 8th Foot (Warley), 2nd Bn. 25th Foot (Plymouth)
  - 2nd Brigade (Salisbury)
    - Queen's Own Tower Hamlets Militia (London), King's Own Tower Hamlets Militia (Dalston), Wexford Militia (Wexford)
  - Divisional Troops
    - North Devon Yeomanry (Barnstaple)
- 2nd Division (Warminster)
  - 1st Brigade (Warminster)
    - Monaghan Militia (Monaghan), Louth Militia (Dundalk), Royal Longford Rifles (Longford)
  - 2nd Brigade (Warminster)
    - Royal Wiltshire Militia (Devizes), Royal Buckinghamshire Militia (High Wycombe), Royal Berkshire Militia (Reading)
  - Divisional Troops
    - 56th Foot (Portland), North Somerset Yeomanry (Bath)
- 3rd Division (Gloucester)
  - 1st Brigade (Gloucester)
    - Royal South Gloucestershire Light Infantry Militia (Bristol), Oxfordshire Militia (Oxford), Royal North Gloucestershire Militia (Cirencester)
  - 2nd Brigade (Gloucester)
    - Shropshire Militia (Shrewsbury), Worcestershire Militia (Worcester)
  - Divisional Troops
    - 37th Foot (Pembroke), Gloucester Yeomanry (Badminton), Shropshire Yeomanry (Shrewsbury)
- Cavalry Brigade (Yeovil)
  - 1st Dragoons (Manchester), 5th Lancers (Woolwich), 7th Dragoon Guards (Aldershot)
  - Wiltshire Yeomanry (Marlborough), Dorset Yeomanry (Dorchester), West Somerset Yeomanry (Taunton)

V Corps was mobilised in July 1876 under the command of General the Hon Sir Augustus Spencer for summer training around the Wylye Valley in Wiltshire. The corps scheme had been dropped by 1881. The 1901 Army Estimates (introduced by St John Brodrick when Secretary of State for War) allowed for six army corps based on the six regional commands: V Corps was to be formed by Northern Command with headquarters in York. It was to comprise 27 artillery batteries (18 Regular, 6 Militia and 3 Volunteer) and 25 infantry battalions (4 Regular, 13 Militia and 8 Volunteers). Under Army Order No 38 of 1907, the corps titles disappeared, but Northern Command continued to be a major administrative organisation.

== First World War ==
V Corps was organised within Second Army of the British Expeditionary Force on 18 February 1915 under the command of Sir Herbert Plumer, who had been commanding Northern Command in England. Initially, V Corps comprised the 27th Division and 28th Division, both composed of Regular Army battalions brought back from various Imperial postings.

=== Order of Battle February 1915 ===
- General Officer Commanding (GOC): Lt-Gen Sir Herbert Plumer
- Brigadier-General, General Staff (BGGS): Brig-Gen Hugh Jeudwine
- Brigadier-General, Royal Artillery (BGRA): Brig-Gen S.D. Browne
- Colonel, Royal Engineers: Col R.D. Petrie
- 27th Division
- 28th Division

=== 1915 fighting ===
The two infantry divisions had taken over French trenches in front of the Messines-Wytschaete Ridge, south of the Ypres Salient. These trenches were wet and poorly protected, and the Indian-issue boots worn by many of the men were inadequate. They had to endure shelling and occasional trench raids as well as bad weather. V Corps played a peripheral part in the Battle of Neuve Chapelle to the south, and then 27th Division took part in the action at St Eloi (14–15 March 1915).

In April 1915, V Corps shifted northwards, taking over the sector from St Eloi to St Julien from the French Army. Now, with three divisions under command (first the 5th Division and then the newly arrived 1st Canadian Division were added), V Corps held the whole south-eastern and eastern part of the Ypres Salient. Between 17 and 22 April, 5 Division succeeded in capturing Hill 60 after underground mines had been fired.

On 22 April, the Germans launched the Second Battle of Ypres with the first cloud gas attack, which virtually destroyed the French divisions in the north of the salient and drove in the flank of 1st Canadian Division. Over the following days, V Corps struggled to plug the gap and hold the line. On 28 April, the BEF was subjected to renewed Germans attacks and Plumer was given an enlarged command – 'Plumer's force', comprising the Cavalry Corps, 3rd (Lahore) Division, 50th (Northumbrian) Division and brigades from 4th and 5th Division in addition to V Corps – and was ordered to organise a withdrawal to the 'Frezenberg Line'. As a result, Second Army was reduced to a single corps and its commander, Sir Horace Smith-Dorrien, resigned. Plumer was appointed to succeed Smith-Dorrien, and V Corps reverted to Second Army control, with Lt-Gen Edmund Allenby transferred from Cavalry Corps to take command.

During the Battle of Frezenberg Ridge (8–13 May), the Germans shelled the 27th and 28th Divisions off the untenable ridge. V Corps lost 456 officers and 8935 other ranks during this battle. The following Battle of Bellewarde Ridge (24–25 May) involved a renewed German gas attack on V Corps. V Corps lost a further 323 officers and 8936 other ranks during the period 21–30 May.

In October 1915, Allenby was promoted to command Third Army and Lt-Gen Hew Dalrymple Fanshawe was transferred from Cavalry Corps (23 October) to replace him at the head of V Corps.

=== Order of Battle February 1916 ===
- GOC: Lt-Gen H.D. Fanshawe
- BGRA: Brig-Gen H.C.C. Uniacke
- 17th (Northern) Division
- 24th Division
- 50th (Northumbrian) Division
- 3rd Division (into reserve between 5 and 8 February).

=== Early 1916 fighting ===
In February 1916, V Corps was still holding a sector of Second Army's line from St Eloi to Hooge. On 14 February, the Germans blew mines and attacked and captured The Bluff, held by 17th Division, which suffered casualties of 67 officers and 1227 men, including 311 missing, of whom around a hundred were captured and many others buried in mine craters. The ground was recaptured on 1 March using innovative artillery preparation techniques pioneered by V Corps' artillery commander Brig-Gen H.C.C. Uniacke.

Meanwhile, on 28 February, Fanshawe ordered 3rd Division to begin preparations for a surprise attack at St Eloi, preceded by mines but without the normal long preparatory bombardment. The attack was made on 27 March and was initially successful, but the weather and ground conditions were awful and 3rd Division was exhausted and unable to consolidate the position in the craters. After it was relieved by 2nd Canadian Division, there were still weeks of bitter trench fighting. On 4 April, Canadian Corps HQ, which had been responsible for the sector south of St Eloi, changed places with V Corps, the first time that a whole corps of the BEF relieved another.

On 30 April, V Corps was the victim of a gas attack by the Germans on the line in front of the Messines-Wytschaete Ridge at the Gas attacks at Wulverghem, followed by an attack on the trenches, but the raiders were driven out. On 4 July, H.D. Fanshawe was relieved from command of V Corps (he reverted to the rank of major-general and later took command of a second-line Territorial division in Home Forces). He was replaced by his elder brother, Lt-Gen Edward Arthur Fanshawe, promoted from command of 11th (Northern) Division.

=== Later fighting in 1916 ===
On 16 August 1916, V Corps HQ was transferred from Second Army to Reserve Army (later renamed Fifth Army) to take over the sector on the River Ancre, where fighting had bogged down during the Somme Offensive. When V Corps took over, the line was held by the Guards, 6th and 20th (Light) Divisions. These were replaced by the fresh 2nd, 39th and 48th (South Midland) Division for the renewed attacks on the Ancre Heights, which continued from September to November 1916 with regular rotation of divisions as they became exhausted. V Corps finally took some of the 1 July objectives, such as Beaumont Hamel (by the 51st (Highland) Division), but ended with a failure at Redan Ridge during the action known as the Battle of the Ancre.

=== Order of Battle 26 February 1917 ===
- GOC: Lt-Gen Edward Fanshawe
- 7th Division
- 19th (Western) Division
- 31st Division
- 62nd (2nd West Riding) Division

=== 1917 Fighting ===
Winter Operations on the Ancre included the capture of Ten Tree Alley by 32nd Division of V Corps on 10–13 February 1917. When the Germans began their retreat to the Hindenburg Line (14 March – 5 April 1917) V Corps followed up slowly against rearguards. On 11 April, Fifth Army attacked the new line at Bullecourt, with the 62nd Division of V Corps in action alongside I Anzac Corps. The same forces met the German attack on Lagnicourt on 15 April 1917. V Corps took part in the second attack on Bullecourt with the 7th Division, the 58th (2/1st London) Division and the 62nd (West Riding) Division. The Corps lost approximately 300 officers and 6500 other ranks between 3 and 17 May.

After Bullecourt, Fifth Army HQ and many of its divisions moved north to prepare for the Ypres Offensive and V Corps HQ was made available to command reserves.

V Corps' staff for the Ypres Offensive comprised:

- GOC: Lt-Gen Sir Edward Fanshawe
- BGGS Brig-Gen G.F. Boyd
- DA&QMG: Brig-Gen H.M. de F. Montgomery
- BGRA: Brig-Gen R.P. Benson
- BGHA: Brig-Gen A.M. Tyler
- CE: Brig-Gen A.J. Craven

On 7 September, V Corps relieved XIX Corps, taking command of 9th (Scottish) Division and 55th (West Lancashire) Division in the line. On 20 September, V Corps was assigned stiff objectives for the Battle of the Menin Road, and the 55th Division took heavy casualties. For the succeeding Battle of Polygon Wood, the frontline divisions were relieved, and V Corps attacked with the 3rd and 59th (2nd North Midland) Divisions.

On 1 December, V Corps HQ was transferred to Third Army and relieved IV Corps along part of the line that had been captured during the Battle of Cambrai. The very next day, the Germans made a heavy counter-attack, and V Corps was forced to withdraw to the Flesquières Line.

=== Order of Battle March 1918 ===
- GOC: Lt-Gen Sir Edward Fanshawe
- 12th (Eastern) Division (joined 25 March)
- 17th (Northern) Division
- 19th (Western) Division (to IV Corps 21 March)
- 47th (1/2nd London) Division
- 63rd (Royal Naval) Division

=== The German March 1918 Offensive ===
Although offering strong defences, the Flesquières position formed a dangerous salient in front of the British line. When the Germans opened their Spring Offensive on 21 March 1918, one of their first objects was to pinch it out. Accordingly, they did not attack frontally, but drenched the salient's defenders (2nd Division and 63rd (Royal Naval) Division) with mustard gas, causing many casualties in the days before the attack. On the evening of 21 March, unaware of the depth of the German penetration against the neighbouring Fifth Army, Third Army (Gen Sir Julian Byng) only ordered V Corps to withdraw 4000 yards to its intermediate defence line in the salient. In the following days, as the situation on the flanks deteriorated, Byng had to issue hasty orders to extricate V Corps from the trap. The Official Historian, Sir James Edmonds, wrote in 1932 that 'Byng the bungler was mainly responsible for clinging to the salient. I will exonerate Fanshawe, who is merely stupid'. Regardless of who was responsible, the setback at the Flesquières salient was nearly disastrous, and led to a dangerous gap opening up between Third and Fifth Army. V Corps attempted to form a defensive flank to Third Army, but the Germans penetrated the gap, and the corps withdrew again on 24 March. During this period (the First Battle of Bapaume,) V Corps' command structure descended into 'extraordinary confusion and lack of orders', according to a battalion commander. The withdrawal entailed a retreat across the devastated zone in front of the Hindenburg Line and the old Somme battlefields, and by the end of 26 March V Corps was back on the Ancre Heights, where the troops held off fresh Germans attacks on 27–28 March (First Battle of Arras (1918)) and 5 April (Battle of the Ancre (1918)).

After the Flesquières fiasco, Byng insisted on Fanshawe being relieved of command. On 25 April, he was replaced as GOC of V Corps by Lt-Gen Cameron Shute, promoted from command of 32nd Division. (Fanshawe later commanded XXIII Corps in England.)

=== Order of Battle 21 August 1918 ===
- GOC: Lt-Gen C.D. Shute
- BGGS: Brig-Gen R.H. Mangles
- DA&QMG: Brig-Gen H.M. de F. Montgomery
- CRA: Brig-Gen R.P. Benson
- CHA: Brig-Gen A.M. Tyler
- CE: Brig-Gen A.G. Stevenson
- 17th (Northern) Division
- 21st Division
- 33rd Division
- 38th (Welsh) Division

=== Later fighting in 1918 ===
During the Allied counter-offensive known as the Second Battle of the Somme (1918), V Corps took part in the Battle of Albert (21–23 Aug) and the Second Battle of Bapaume (31 Aug – 3 Sept). Then, during the Battles of the Hindenburg Line, V Corps participated in the Battles of Havrincourt (12 Sept), Epehy (18 Sept), St Quentin Canal (29 Sept-2 Oct), Beaurevoir (3–5 Oct) and Cambrai (8–9 Oct). In the Final Advance in Picardy, V Corps was in the pursuit to the River Selle (9–12 Oct), the Battle of the Selle (17–25 Oct) and the Battle of the Sambre (4 Nov).

V Corps crossed the Canal du Nord unopposed on 30 September and occupied the Hindenburg Main and Support Lines when the Germans withdrew to the Beaurevoir Line, which it overran on 8 October. For the follow-up on 9 October there were no trenches or wire in front, so Shute's orders were for open warfare, and no barrages were fired, the artillery moving up behind the infantry in support. As a result, V Corps gained more ground than formations that made conventional setpiece attacks behind a barrage. Reaching the River Selle German resistance stiffened, but V Corps got outposts over the river on 10 October. Third Army attacked and crossed the Selle 12–17 October. Between 8 and 19 October, V Corps, which had done much of the fighting, suffered 5740 casualties.

The advance was renewed on 20 October, with V Corps seizing a series of ridges in four planned bounds. On 23–4 October, it took a series of objectives, crossing the German Hermann II position. By now, the Germans were showing little fight, and V Corps' night attacks were able to take positions with few casualties. Even so, the British dug in for about a week, preparing for the next offensive beginning on 1 November. V Corps renewed its advance on 4 November with an attack into the Forest of Mormal. The advance was now in the nature of a pursuit, held up only by rearguards and the dreadful condition of the road.

When the Armistice ended hostilities on 11 November 1918, V Corps was within a mile or two of the Franco-Belgian border, with cavalry out in front.

== Second World War ==
(The Corps should not be confused with the French 5th Army Corps, which took part in the Battle of France in 1940, nor with the US V Corps of the US First Army, which took part in the D-Day landings of 6 June 1944.)

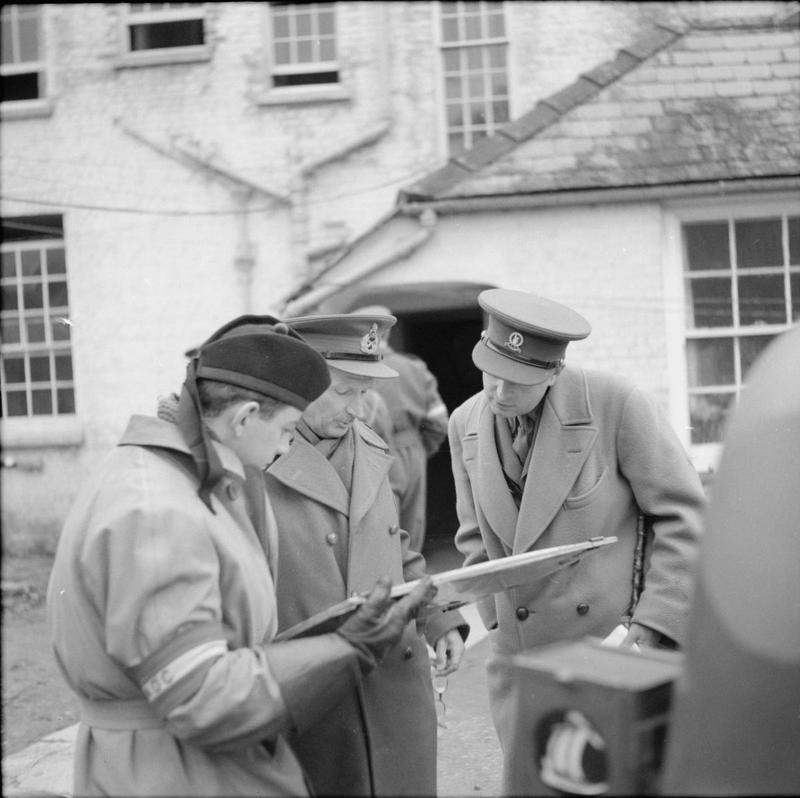
Lieutenant-General Bernard Montgomery consulting a map with his officers during a V Corps exercise.

In the early part of the Second World War, V Corps was based at Bhurtpore Barracks in Tidworth Camp within Southern Command. Lieutenant-General Claude Auchinleck was briefly its commander from 14 June 1940 until he was promoted to take over Southern Command on 19 July 1940. He was succeeded by Lieutenant-General Bernard Montgomery from 22 July 1940 until 27 April 1941, when he was transferred to command XII Corps.

Order of Battle Autumn 1940

- 4th Infantry Division
- 50th (Northumbrian) Infantry Division
- Royal Artillery
  - 66th Medium Regiment
  - 5th Survey Regiment

The Dorset County Division was also under the corps' command during 1941.

The Corps was then included as part of the Allied land forces, British First Army, in Operation Torch (8 November 1942), the amphibious landings in French-held Morocco and Algeria. The Army was commanded by Lieutenant-General Sir Kenneth Anderson. First Army was formed on 9 November 1942.

=== Campaigns ===
V Corps participated in the following campaigns and battles during its Second World War existence.

- Operation Torch (British First Army)
- Tunisia Campaign December 1942 – May 1943 (British First Army)
- Italian Campaign September 1943 – May 1945 (as part of the British Eighth Army)
  - Allied invasion of Italy 1943 (Adriatic, Foggia, Termoli)
  - Sangro Operation November – December 1943
  - Adriatic Coast Operation February 1944
  - Battle of Monte Cassino Operation May 1944
  - Gothic Line (Gotenstellung) Operation Olive August 1944 (with 1st Armoured, 46th (West Riding) and 56th (London) Infantry divisions)
    - First Battle of Coriano
    - Battle for Croce
    - Second Battle of Coriano
    - Battle of Rimini
  - Spring 1945 offensive in Italy April 1945
  - Repatriation of Cossacks after World War II

V Corps was assigned to British Eighth Army for the rest of the war (as part of the 15th Army Group) 11.44

=== Orders of Battle for V Corps, Second World War ===
V Corps (British First Army) 20 April 1943

- British 25th Army Tank Brigade (51st Royal Tank Regiment detached)
- British 1st Infantry Division
- British 4th Infantry Division
- British 78th Infantry Division

V Corps (British First Army) 4 May 1943

- North Irish Horse
- 7eme Régiment Tirallieurs Algériens
- 1st Army Group Royal Artillery
- British 1st Infantry Division
- British 46th Infantry Division (139th Infantry Brigade Group detached)
- British 78th Infantry Division

V Corps British Eighth Army (9 April 1945)

- 8th Indian Infantry Division (Major-General Dudley Russell)
- British 56th Infantry Division (Major-General John Yeldham Whitfield)
- British 78th Infantry Division (Major-General Keith Arbuthnott)
- 2nd New Zealand Division (Lieutenant-General Sir Bernard C. Freyberg) (until 14 April)
- Cremona Combat Group (Italian)
- Royal Artillery
  - 54th Super Heavy Regiment less two batteries
  - 5th Survey Regiment
  - 57th (Wessex) Heavy Anti-Aircraft Regiment less one battery
  - 52nd (East Lancashire) Light Anti-Aircraft Regiment
  - 651st Air OP Squadron
  - 654th Air OP Squadron
  - 323rd Searchlight Battery
  - 17th Field Regiment one battery
  - 57th (East Surrey) Anti-Tank Regiment, one battery
  - 55th (Kent) Heavy Anti-Aircraft Regiment one battery
- V Corps Troops, Royal Engineers
  - 42nd Field Company
  - 564th Field Company
  - 565th Field Company
  - 751st Field Company
  - 215th Corps Field Park Company
  - 22nd Mechanical Equipment Platoon
  - 586th Army Field Company
  - 85th Company, South African Engineer Corps (Camouflage detachment)
- 5th (London) Corps Signals, Royal Corps of Signals
- 3 Field Ambulance, Royal Army Medical Corps

== General Officers Commanding ==
Commanders included:

- 8 February – 8 May 1915 Lieutenant-General Sir Herbert Plumer
- 8 May – 23 October 1915 Lieutenant-General Sir Edmund Allenby
- 23 October 1915 – 5 July 1916 Lieutenant-General Hew Fanshawe
- 5 July – 11 August 1916 Lieutenant-General Edward Fanshawe
- 11 August – 17 August 1916 Major-General Oliver Nugent (acting)
- 17 August 1916 – 28 April 1918 Lieutenant-General Edward Fanshawe
- 28 April 1918 – 1919 Lieutenant-General Cameron Shute
- 1 June 1940 – 10 July 1940 Lieutenant-General Claude Auchinleck
- 22 July 1940 – 1 April 1941 Lieutenant-General Bernard Montgomery
- 1 April 1941 – 8 March 1942 Major-General Edmond Schreiber
- 9 March 1942 – 8 August 1944 Lieutenant-General Charles Allfrey
- 1944 – 1945 Lieutenant-General Charles Keightley
