= William Henry Seymour =

British Army officer

General Sir William Henry Seymour KCB
- Born: 1829
- Died: 20 June 1921 (aged 91)
- Military career
- Allegiance: United Kingdom
- Branch: British Army
- Rank: General
- Conflicts: Crimean War; Indian Rebellion of 1857
- Awards: Knight Commander of the Order of the Bath

General Sir William Henry Seymour KCB (1829 – 20 June 1921) was a senior British Army officer.

== Military career ==
Seymour was commissioned into the 68th Regiment of Foot in 1847. He was promoted to Lieutenant in 1852 without purchase. He saw action in the Crimean War in 1854 and was promoted to Captain in December of that year. He transferred regiments to the 2nd Dragoon Guards in 1855 and served in the Indian Rebellion of 1857. There, he rose from Captain to Major, and from Major to Lieutenant Colonel.

Colonel Seymour then served as Inspector-General of Cavalry in Ireland from 1874 to 1879. He was Colonel of the 3rd Dragoon Guards from 1883 to 1891, colonel of the 13th Hussars from 1891 to 1894 and colonel of the 2nd Dragoon Guards (Queen's Bays) from 1894 until his death on 20 June 1921.

Military offices
Preceded by Robert Robertson	Colonel of the 3rd Dragoon Guards; 1883–1891	Succeeded by Conyers Tower
Preceded by Richard Prettejohn	Colonel of the 13th Hussars; 1891–1894	Succeeded by Sir Baker Russell
Preceded by Sir Charles Walker	Colonel of the 2nd Dragoon Guards (Queen's Bays); 1894–1921	Succeeded by Sir Hew Fanshawe
