= Philip Howell =

British Army general (1877–1916)

Brigadier-General Philip Howell CMG
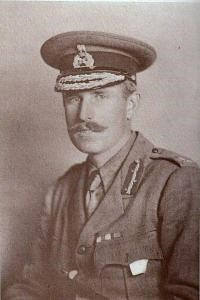
- Born: 7 December 1877; Surbiton, England
- Died: 7 October 1916 (aged 38); Authuille, France
- Burial place: Varennes Military Cemetery, France
- Military career
- Allegiance: United Kingdom
- Branch: British Army
- Rank: Brigadier-General
- Commands: 4th Queen's Own Hussars
- Conflicts: First World War
- Awards: Companion of the Order of St Michael and St George; Mentioned in Despatches (6)

Brigadier-General Philip Howell, CMG (7 December 1877 – 7 October 1916) was a senior British Army staff officer during the First World War. He was, successively, Brigadier General, General Staff (BGGS) to the Cavalry Corps and then to X Corps. In October 1915 he was posted as BGGS to the British Salonika Army before appointment as BGGS and second-in-command to II Corps, then forming part of the Fifth Army at the Battle of Somme in 1916.

Howell was killed in action at Authuille by shrapnel on 7 October 1916, after making a personal reconnaissance of the frontline near Thiepval during the later Somme offensives. Howell had been in action on the front line since the outbreak of the war, serving with the British Expeditionary Force, and commanding the 4th Queen's Own Hussars through the retreat from Mons, the Battle of Le Cateau, the Marne offensive, Hill 60, and the First Battle of Ypres. He was mentioned in despatches six times, and made a Companion of the Order of St Michael and St George in 1915 for "meritorious service".

Howell came from a military family. After education at Lancing College and passing out from the Royal Military College, Sandhurst with honours, he joined the elite Queen's Own Corps of Guides as a subaltern in 1900. Aged 25, he was made brigade major by Major General Douglas Haig, when Haig was Inspector-General of Cavalry, India. This was the start of a lifelong friendship between Haig and Howell. Howell's interests were more extensive than soldiering, and he travelled throughout the Balkan region, becoming a correspondent for The Times and an expert on the local politics of the Near East. This experience and a formidable intellect led to his becoming a senior instructor at the Staff College, Camberley. He had himself attended the Staff College, Quetta, in India in 1903–04.

It was expected, even amongst the highest military circles, that had Howell not been killed in action he would have reached the highest command in the British Army. This was certainly the view of many of his contemporaries and peers. At the age of 37, he was gazetted as brigadier general in September 1915 and, rather than holding "temporary" rank, was the youngest fully promoted general officer in the British Army during the First World War. Of military significance was his direct role in the strategic planning of the later conclusive actions of the Somme Offensive; the successful battles of Thiepval Ridge and Ancre Heights. These used more sophisticated planned attacks using techniques such as synchronised barrages, the use of a limited number of tanks and proper briefing of field commanders. Lieutenant General Sir Claud Jacob, is quoted as saying that much of what his II Corps achieved during the Somme was owed to Howell's efforts, and in fact he had left much of the daily command to Howell, who was a man of exceptional capability.

== Early life ==
Philip Howell was born in England on 7 December 1877, the second son of Lieutenant Colonel Horace Howell, late the Punjab Frontier Force, and Ella Howell, from Shepshed, Leicestershire. Between the age of six and ten Howell, and his family, joined his father in India and Kashmir, living in places such as Kohat, Murree, and Dera Ismail Khan. He returned to England for schooling in 1887, at Miss Gilzean's school in Clifton, and for two years as a day-boy at Shrewsbury House Preparatory School, Surbiton (his paternal grandfather, John Howell lived in Surrey.) Following this he went to Lancing College from January 1891, joining the fourth form under R.D. Budworth and attended until December 1896. His mother had died prematurely from a long illness in August 1889. Shortly after, his father had retired to Brighton, after a long service in the Indian Army.

== Sandhurst and early military career ==
Howell attended the Royal Military College, Sandhurst, passing out with honours (first in fencing, second in riding), and was commissioned second lieutenant on the unattached list of the Indian Army on 4 August 1897. He then served as a subaltern in his father's former regiment, the 5th Punjab Cavalry, in India, from 1898 to 1900. He was promoted lieutenant on 4 November 1899, and transferred in June 1900 to the Queen's Own Corps of Guides ("Lumsden's Horse") – an elite cavalry unit of the Punjab Frontier Force which at the time operated entirely in the North-West Frontier. Howell blended well with this environment. He was a natural with the native troops, taking the trouble to know their language and culture, and respected by them for his professionalism as a soldier. He equally gained the confidence of the local Pathan tribesmen, of whom he had a natural curiosity and talent for dialogue. He had an inherent instinct for exploring different views and cultures, born out of an engaging charm, as well as an instinct for both understanding and treating all on an equal footing – but still able to retain his own authority. These unusual qualities remained with him throughout his career. In 1902 the Corps of Guides won the Cavalry Reconnaissance Competition, in which Howell was the patrol commander.

During his time as a cavalry subaltern, Howell developed through regimental life a deep love of polo, although a contemporary was later to write that his interest in training and love for his polo ponies exceeded his skill on the playing field. The same officer, Major General Llewelyn Alberic Emilius Price-Davies, VC also described him as a fine horseman who could "tent peg or pickup a handkerchief off the ground on a big horse barebacked at the gallop". He had a lifelong love of animals, and "adored mischief in animals, as he did children".

In December 1903 Howell's military professionalism was recognised when Major General Douglas Haig, who had just been appointed Inspector-General of Cavalry, India spotted some manoeuvres performed by Howell during an exercise. Haig selected Howell, then twenty-five years old, as his brigade major during further field exercises held in India and up to 1905. This was the start of a lifelong friendship and correspondence between Howell and Haig. Ever loyal, Howell never deflected from his support for Haig in his enterprise during the First World War, whom he perceived to be the best man for the job and infinitely better suited to lead than most of the contemporary generals of the time. However, although one of Haig's champions he was also able to criticise.

== Pre-war career ==
Howell had also begun to use his leave for travel, extensively in the Balkan region since 1903. He became a special correspondent for The Times, sending in contributions to Charles Moberly Bell, the editor. In its obituary of 14 October 1914, The Spectator mentions Howell's correspondence with The Times during the Macedonian Uprising of 1903, in which his letters "brushed" with those of Prime Minister Arthur Balfour on the "balance of criminality", and describes these as "admirably written and illuminating". This set the form for later Balkan and Near East exploits, and he became a leading expert on the military and political affairs of the region.

Howell was promoted to captain in August 1906, and was given the job of Intelligence Officer (as Staff Captain) for the North West Frontier region, where his intuitive knowledge of local Pathan politics played their part. On his own initiative he set up a network of "spies" in the local villages extending across to Turkestan and Kashgar, as resembling characters from Rudyard Kipling's contemporary novel,"Kim".

In 1909, Howell was brigade major to Major General Sir Malcolm Grover in India. Between 1909 and 1911 Howell served as a GSO3 staff officer to the Inspector-General of Cavalry, British Army (Major General Edmund Allenby) at the War Office in London, with frequent intermittent visits to the Balkans, as special correspondent with The Times. The latter brought him into contact with notable figures and other journalists in the region, including James Bourchier and Compton Mackenzie.

Shortly before this, in 1908, Howell first met his future wife, Rosalind Upcher Buxton, at her family home at Fritton Hall, Lowestoft, Norfolk. She was a member of the notable slave trade abolitionist Buxton family (also known for banking and brewing), and had travelled extensively in Turkey and the Levant. The mutual interest in Near Eastern affairs and culture drew them together, and led to marriage on 11 September 1911.

In December 1911, Howell was appointed by Major General William Robertson as a senior instructor at the Staff College, Camberley with the additional title of "Professor of Military Studies". He was promoted to temporary major while employed in this role.

In the Christmas vacation of 1912, Howell was sent to Thrace, both by The Times (as special correspondent) and the War Office as " military observer" attached to the Bulgarian Army of General Savov during the First Balkan War. His observations, which included an early favourable assessment of the capabilities of the Bulgarian Army, were turned into a series of military lectures for the Staff College, and published as a book, "Campaign in Thrace – 1912".

On 14 May 1913 Howell was promoted major in the 4th Hussars, as second-in-command, then based at The Curragh in Ireland. It was during the Curragh Incident of March 1914, propagated by the forthcoming Home Rule Bill and some confusion amongst high command, that Howell's writing skills and diplomatic abilities came to the fore. The question was posed to officers serving in Ireland (individually) whether they would resign their commissions if asked to march on Ulster – where Carson proposed resisting the Home Rule Bill. Almost all the officers offered to resign their commissions, creating an internal crisis. Howell drafted a letter to the Army Council, on behalf of the officers, and its brigade commander, Hubert Gough. The content of the letter helped defuse the issue. His efforts were further extended by his writing a personal letter to The Times in which he denounced the fact that soldiers had been asked to choose between their own political conscience and their duty to serve, in an impossible ultimatum. He posed the question that there had been a deliberate effort by the politicians to pass off the decision on to the Army. The letter was signed "A Soldier Serving in Ireland". Both these efforts contributed in some small way to common sense being applied and the order being rescinded.

== British Expeditionary Force ==
At the outbreak of war with Germany in 1914, the 4th Hussars was mobilized as part of the British Expeditionary Force (BEF) making its way to Dublin for embarkation to France. The regiment travelled with its horses aboard the SS Atlantus , arriving in Le Havre on 15 August 1914. The 4th Hussars formed part of the 3rd Cavalry Brigade commanded by Brigadier General Hubert Gough, and quickly became embroiled in the Battle and subsequent Retreat from Mons. During these actions the commanding officer, Lieutenant Colonel Ian Hogg, died from wounds received in a rearguard action on 1 September. Howell assumed command of the 4th Hussars through the Battle of Le Cateau, until relieved by the appointment of Lieutenant Colonel Tom Bridges on 27 September. However, Bridges appointment lasted three days, before he was promoted brigadier general and sent to become chief military adviser to the King of Belgium. Howell resumed command of the 4th Hussars, being promoted lieutenant colonel on 18 October. He led the 4th Hussars throughout the remainder of the advance of First Battle of Marne, and then in the following ten months through the frontline carnage of the First Battle of Ypres, Hill 60, and Neuve Chappelle.

Howell was respected by his men as a gallant and able regimental commander, and these were quoted as saying that "if the Colonel was there, everything was alright." On one occasion during the battle of Ypres, when his regiment were ordered to take a tactically useless obstacle (a stable block) that had been retaken several times at considerable human cost, Howell was able to countermand on the pretext that as the order was being made the telephone line had been cut. Afterward he stated that "a deaf ear at the telephone may be as useful as a blind eye at the telescope". He was appointed a Companion of the Order of St Michael and St George in February 1915 for "meritorious service during the war" and had by this stage of the war been mentioned in despatches no less than four times.

== Staff appointments during the war ==
In March 1915 Howell was appointed Brigadier General, General Staff (BGGS) to the Cavalry Corps under Lieutenant General Edmund Allenby. His promotion to brigadier general was approved and gazetted in September 1915. He was 37 years old.

Both Allenby and Howell were quick to point out that cavalry largely became ineffective in trench warfare impeding much of the point of a Cavalry Corps, although this view was not as pessimistic as some observed at the time. It was simply a reality of trench warfare and way the war was now being conducted. In July 1915 the Cavalry Corps was broken up into its former divisional and brigade structure (redistributed as dismounted battalions to support the infantry in the trenches, although in 1916 it was reinstated). Howell was transferred to the more active role of Chief of Staff of X Corps under the command of Lieutenant General Thomas Morland. Howell approved of Morland, who he perceived to be one of the youngest Corps commanders and therefore more receptive to new more practical ideas. However, Howell's time with X Corps on the Western Front was short lived, as matters developed on a wider geographical scale.

The Dardanelles Campaign had been launched in April 1915. Once this had failed in its early objective of surprise, and the British (more particularly the Anzac and Indian forces) began to count the heavy cost, Howell was amongst the earliest voices calling for withdrawal – but this was largely dissipated amongst those wanting to save face and prolong the campaign. On leave in London, Howell dined on one occasion with Winston Churchill – an interesting confrontation of minds, as both were of a similar age and had both served with the 4th Hussars, although at different times. The Dardanelles featured much in the dialogue, and Churchill remonstrated with Howell not to be too harsh about a project that he (Churchill) referred to as "his child".

Politically, moves had been started to launch a Balkan campaign via the port of Salonica. This was a motion largely promoted by the French. Howell could see no logic to a widened Balkan expedition unless Bulgaria was brought either on to the side of the allies or persuaded to remain neutral thereby allowing allied forces to pass through their territory unimpeded to attack the Central flanks – using the promise of territorial gain. He knew and appreciated from direct experience that Bulgaria had a better equipped and trained army than neighboring forces, especially those of a depleted Serbia or an indiscipline military "rabble" from within a Greece split between a pro-German monarchy and nationalist government loyalists.

Encouraged by higher command to take up an appointment in the region because of his expert knowledge, Howell was wary of a Balkan enterprise, partly that because of a lack of allied initiative, the Bulgarians were persuaded to side with German ambitions. Later his earlier views on Bulgaria were deliberately taken out of context (and timing), but these "pro-Bulgar" opinions were largely based on finding the best practical solution for this sector of the First War. He himself said "take away Bulgaria and the whole German pack of cards falls to pieces", referring to German ambitions in the Near East, but also in a wider context.

== Salonica campaign ==
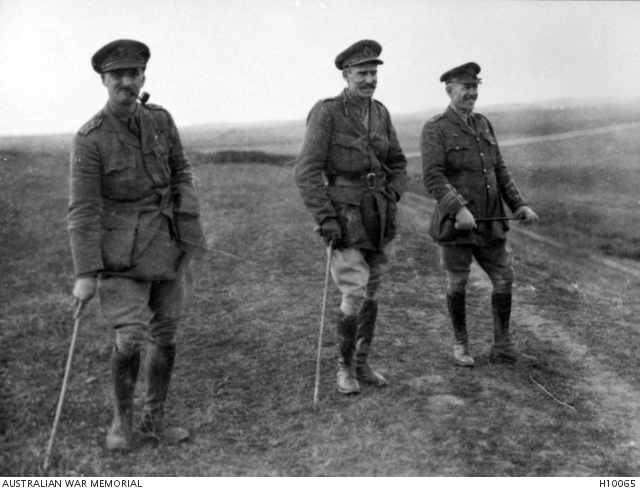
Brigadier General P. Howell and two other unnamed officers on an inspection, Salonika, 1916.

Because of his expert pre-war knowledge of the Balkans, Howell was a natural choice to be sent to assist in the gathering momentum for a Salonica campaign. A significant part of this momentum stemmed from the French. With the defection of Bulgaria to the German cause, this pace quickly increased. In October 1915, Howell was sent to Salonica as BGGS to XII Corps under Lieutenant General Wilson. However, as matters progressed towards a Balkan offensive the British Salonica Army was created from XII Corps and the new XVI Corps, under the leadership of Lieutenant General Sir Bryan Mahon, and Howell was appointed as his chief of staff. General Sarrail commanded the French contingent, which largely comprised French colonial forces.

The first months of the campaign were, as predicted, entangled with political wrangling, not least of which concerned Greek internal politics, primarily the ongoing rift between the pro-German monarchists and the government led by Prime Minister Venizelos. These required much negotiation and diplomacy, which included dealing with the difficult King Constantine of Greece, apart from military matters. Other issues included the logistics of having an ultimate command structure based at GHQ in Alexandria, Egypt, a distance of 1800 miles – rather than the closer Malta. Eventually the new offensive was launched, and Howell was conveyed to the new front line by a Royal Navy motor torpedo boat to Kavalla. Also as predicted, the new offensive came almost immediately up against strong Bulgaro-German resistance, and stalled. Indeed, the stalemate continued until 1918 tying down the vital resource of six Allied divisions.

As a result of what some considered as a distorted publication (in Christabel Pankhurst's Britannia) of some private notes Howell had sent to a few individual generals and politicians outlining his views on Bulgaria before that country had even entered the war, Howell became embroiled in some controversy as being "pro-Bulgar", which eventually resulted in a call for his recall by a few "pro-Serbian" MPs. Although Howell was not in the least anti-Serbian or a defeatist, he was happy to be released from a campaign he was not convinced would succeed. Legal action for libel against Britannia was considered, but because of his early death never concluded.

== Battle of the Somme ==
Howell returned to the Western Front during the impending build up for the Battle of the Somme, which had been brought forward in time, and with a reduced French role, by French pressure on the new British commander in chief, General Douglas Haig, to relieve the attrition being sustained at Verdun. He was appointed chief of staff and second-in-command to II Corps which after being held in reserve on the first day became part of General Sir Hubert Gough's Reserve (later renamed Fifth) Army. His corps commander was Lieutenant General Sir Claud Jacob, with whom he forged a strong partnership of command. Jacob later wrote "He was the most capable staff officer I have ever come across in all my service."

Howell took advantage of the lesser role played by Gough's Fifth Army (compared to Henry Rawlinson's Fourth Army) in July on the Somme to conduct an entire survey of the battlefield as it developed, and whilst disappointed that once again "lessons had not been learned", sought to find positives from which later actions would benefit. As a result of this, Douglas Haig requested that he compile a confidential report.

Earlier in the war, Howell had actively sought to prevent the sending of battalions made up and commanded entirely by "green" conscripts. In one letter he outlines this in an annotated argument in which he points out that an army created from mixing new raw arrivals with experienced non-commissioned officers and soldiers to create a unit that was "fairly good throughout" was preferable to one made entirely of untrained conscripts in which "a small part was very good whilst the remainder were indifferent." He was, therefore, opposed to "pals" battalions in essence, and after the initial Somme offensive reorganized some of the decimated remnants of some of these into the more experienced units of his command. More particularly he was adamant that divisional, brigade, and battalion commanders be properly briefed prior to any engagement.

During August and into September 1916, Howell was given the opportunity to implement his tactical ideas in some relatively small engagements. These included afternoon offensives, synchronized barrages – including the wider use of creeping barrages – and the limited use of tanks. The purpose of afternoon attacks was that the enemy had less to time to reorganize before darkness fell (the German Army in both World Wars hardly ever engaged during the night) and this gave more time for the British attackers to regroup overnight. II Corps had already achieved better results with afternoon attacks. Importantly, he held detailed briefing for all commanders immediately before any attack, insuring that these understood all elements of the ongoing attack, and their role in it. The success of these small operations, although not perfect, began to unravel some initial objectives leading eventually (and after his death) to the success of the battles of Thiepval Ridge and thereon to Ancre Heights (a shared objective.) More particularly his efforts contributed to the taking of the enemy strongholds of the Schwaben Redoubt, and other "anchors" which the Germans used to keep a hold on the territory.

Howell was never to see the completion of these offensives which included the final capture of Thiepval. He was a frequent visitor to frontline trenches, and to make personal observations so that he could be sure of undistorted facts. It was on one of these visits on 7 October 1916 that he was killed by shrapnel from a stray shell on the track leading from Authuilles. He was alone at the time. The previous day he had visited the front line trenches of his regiment the 4th Hussars at Dernancourt.

== Obituaries ==
Howell received some approbation in the published obituaries and letters published in journals. Some of these defended him from the personal attacks made on him by Christabel Pankhurst's pamphlet Britannia whilst he served in Salonica. Howell said of himself that his own abilities stemmed from "the want of shaping up a muddle."

General Sir Bryan Mahon wrote: "Howell was a brilliant General Staff Officer, self-reliant, quick to grasp the situation, full of energy and enterprise. He performed exceptionally good service at Salonica under difficult and complicated conditions."

The Westminster Gazette said of him: "In the difficult times to come Howell's constructive mind would have brought him to a high place in the Army or the State. A few such men, with that rare combination of zeal with breadth, that absorption in giving rather than getting, that power of keeping the mind fresh and elastic in official harness, would be of infinite value to the nation."

== Influence ==
At the time of his death Howell was 38, and one of the youngest British generals of the time. Although he was too young to have overall authority, or to make immediate the changes he desired to outmoded military practices, at times his influence extended beyond his years. His military career and journalistic travels brought him into contact with all manner of people, some of considerable influence. He corresponded with Douglas Haig throughout his life, but also had enjoyed the friendship of Lloyd George, a future prime minister. He was a regular correspondent with Gertrude Bell, and also counted many literary and artistic figures as his friends.

== Personal life ==
Howell was one of five brothers and one sister. Neither rich nor poor, he came from a family with strong trading and business enterprise in South East London. The family business, Hayter, Howell & Co, was a successful firm of military packers and merchants based in south-east London. One Howell ancestor, Sir Thomas Howell, had as a result of family business connections risen to prominence as Director of Contracts to the War Office (1855–1874) during the Crimean War. Earlier ancestors had been prominent guild merchants in Oswestry in Shropshire, several generations being Mayor of this market town in the Welsh Marches. Howell's military ambitions were not conceived from any compelling financial reasons (as argued by Robbins) but more directly from the fact of his father's career as a soldier in the Punjab, and a direct interest in military affairs, as well as an enormous sense of adventure - which characteristics he shared with most of the successful soldiers of his generation.

Howell married Rosalind Upcher Buxton of Fritton Hall, Lowestoft, Norfolk. She came from a family of means (Barclays Bank), firmly embedded in the liberal establishment. She was also a close friend of many literary and artists of that generation including Nevinson, both Nash brothers, and George Bernard Shaw (whose Fabian meetings she regularly attended.)

They had two children; a daughter, Deborah Howell, an eminent international veterinary surgeon (an expert on mastitis in cattle) and a son born posthumously, Paul Philip Howell, civil servant, overseas development expert, anthropologist and Cambridge academic.

Howell is buried in the War Cemetery at Varennes, France. His gravestone bears the insignia of the 4th Queen's Own Hussars and the inscription "Fellowship is heaven and the lack of fellowship is hell."

Military offices
Preceded by J. F. N. Birch	Brigadier-General, General Staff, Cavalry Corps; March–August 1915	Succeeded by A. F. Home
Preceded by G. de S. Barrow	BGGS, X Corps; August–October 1915	Succeeded by A. R. Cameron
Preceded by L. J. Bols	BGGS, XII Corps; October–November 1915	Succeeded by C. J. Perceval
Preceded by New post	BGGS, British Salonika Army; November 1915–May 1916	Succeeded by W. Gillman
Preceded by P. P. de B. Radcliffe	BGGS, II Corps; June–October 1916	Succeeded by S. H. Wilson
