= Edward Fanshawe (British Army officer) =

British Army general

Lieutenant-General Sir Edward Fanshawe KCB
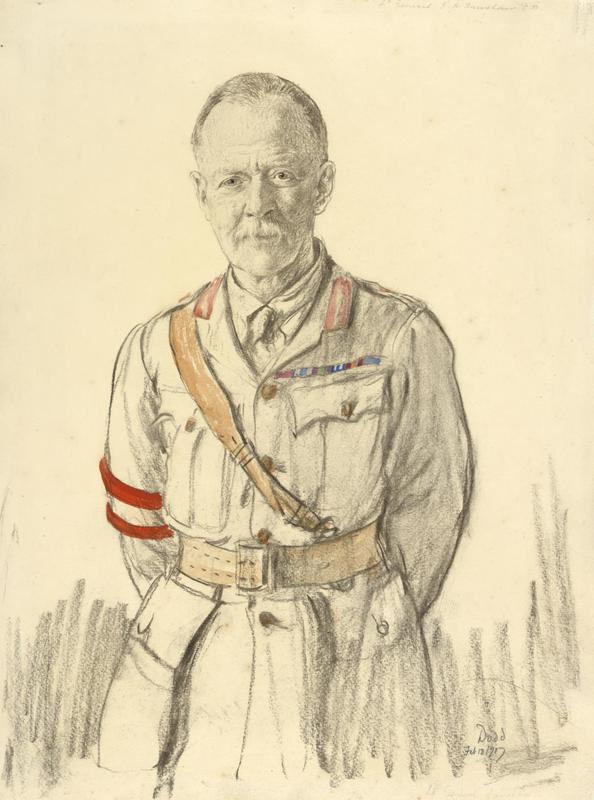
- 1917 portrait by Francis Dodd
- Born: 4 April 1859; Clifton Hampden, Oxfordshire, England
- Died: 13 November 1952 (aged 93)
- Relatives: Major General Sir Robert Fanshawe (brother); Lieutenant General Sir Hew Dalrymple Fanshawe (brother)
- Military career
- Allegiance: United Kingdom
- Branch: British Army
- Service years: 1878–1923
- Rank: Lieutenant-General
- Unit: Royal Artillery
- Commands: V Corps; 11th (Northern) Division; 31st Division
- Conflicts: Second Anglo-Afghan War; First World War
- Awards: Knight Commander of the Order of the Bath

Lieutenant-General Sir Edward Arthur Fanshawe, KCB (4 April 1859 – 13 November 1952) was a British Army general of the First World War, who commanded the 11th (Northern) Division at Gallipoli and the V Corps on the Western Front during the Battle of the Somme, the Third Battle of Ypres, and the 1918 German spring offensive. He was the second eldest of three brothers who rose to command divisions or corps during the war.

== Background and family ==
Fanshawe was born on 4 April 1859, the son of the Reverend Henry Leighton Fanshawe, of Chilworth, Oxfordshire. He attended Winchester College and the Royal Military Academy, Woolwich, then joined the Royal Artillery in July 1878. He was the eldest of three brothers with significant military careers; Hew (b. 1860) joined the cavalry and Robert (b. 1863) joined the infantry, all three rising to command corps or divisions during the First World War.

Fanshawe married Rose Higginson, daughter of Sir James Higginson, in 1893; they had three sons.

== Early military career ==
Fanshawe was commissioned as a lieutenant in the Royal Artillery on 31 July 1878. He served in the Second Anglo-Afghan War in 1878–80 and the Sudan expedition of 1885, following which he was promoted to captain on 17 March 1886. After promotion to major on 5 March 1896, he was in charge of H Battery stationed in Meerut in British India, then transferred home to be in charge of the new W Battery at Woolwich in April 1900, later of the new Z Battery at Newbridge Barracks, before he was appointed in command of a battery of the Royal Horse Artillery (RHA) serving in South Africa during the Second Boer War.

He stayed in South Africa until after the end of this war, and in November 1902 left Port Natal on the SS Ortona with the O Battery RHA, bound for Lucknow in the Bengal Presidency. Rising steadily through the ranks, he was promoted to lieutenant colonel in July 1903, brevet colonel in July 1906, and colonel in July 1908. In September 1909 he was promoted to temporary brigadier general and appointed to command the artillery in one of the two Regular Army divisions garrisoned in Ireland; whilst serving there, he was personally commended by King George V for saving an artilleryman from being crushed by a cavalry parade in Dublin.

In October 1913, he was transferred to command the divisional artillery in the Wessex Division of the Territorial Force (TF).

== First World War ==
At the outbreak of the First World War in August 1914, Fanshawe, promoted to temporary brigadier general that month, remained with the Wessex Division when it mobilised for service.

The division was earmarked for service in India; however, before it sailed, Fanshawe was ordered to the Continent of Europe to join the British Expeditionary Force (BEF), where he became the brigadier general, Royal Artillery for the 1st Division. He succeeded Brigadier General Neil Douglas Findlay, who had been killed by shellfire on 10 September at the Battle of the Marne. He remained with the division through the winter of 1914–1915 and was made a Companion of the Order of the Bath in February 1915.

Fanshawe was promoted to major general, "for distinguished service in the Field", and, after serving briefly as major general, Royal Artillery (MGRA) of General Sir Douglas Haig's First Army, was recalled home in late July to command the newly formed 31st Division of the New Army.

Like his previous assignment, however, this was only brief as he was transferred in August to take over the 11th (Northern) Division, which had been sent to Gallipoli in the Mediterranean, from Major General Frederick Hammersley. He remained with the division through the evacuation of the Dardanelles and beyond later in the year.

Shortly after Fanshawe and the division arrived in France in July 1916, he was promoted to the temporary rank of lieutenant-general and took command of V Corps. The corps had previously been commanded by his younger brother Hew, until he had been removed from command as a result of political manoeuvering following the failure of the actions of St Eloi Craters in late March.

V Corps was holding a position in the Ypres salient at the time Fanshawe took command, but in August it was transferred south, to support the Somme offensive. In the final phase of the Somme fighting, at the Battle of the Ancre in November, he commanded an attack which captured Beaumont Hamel, one of the initial objectives of the offensive more than three months earlier. He was knighted the following year.

Fanshawe remained with the corps through 1917, where it fought at the Third Battle of Ypres, and into 1918, where it began the year holding an exposed salient on the boundary between Third and Fifth Armies. It was heavily attacked in Operation Michael, the first phase of the German spring offensive of March 1918, and both it and the neighbouring VII Corps were forced to retreat, leaving a gap in the British lines. The responsibility for this was a matter of historical dispute for some decades, but the response at the time was unambiguous; both Fanshawe and the commander of VII Corps, Walter Congreve, were removed from command.

In August 1918 Fanshawe was appointed to command XXIII Corps, and, reverting to major general, shortly thereafter transferred to command the garrison on the Firth of Forth in September, a posting which he held until after the end of the war.

== Retirement and final years ==
Fanshawe was formally confirmed in the permanent rank of lieutenant general in June 1919, and retired from the army in February 1923. He then succeeded Lieutenant General Sir Lawrence Parsons in the ceremonial position of colonel commandant of the Royal Artillery, holding this position from August 1923 until 1929. He ceased to belong to the reserve of officers in April 1926. He was then colonel commandant of the Royal Horse Artillery from 1930 to 1934.

He died at the age of 93 in November 1952.

== Notes ==
Military offices
Preceded by New post	GOC 31st Division; July–August 1915	Succeeded by Robert Wanless O'Gawan
Preceded by Frederick Hammersley	GOC 11th (Northern) Division; August 1915 – July 1916	Succeeded by Charles Woollcombe
Preceded by Hew Fanshawe	GOC V Corps; 4 July 1916 – 25 April 1918	Succeeded by Cameron Shute
Preceded by	General Officer Commanding the XXIII Corps; 1918	Succeeded by
Preceded by	Colonel Commandant of the Royal Artillery; 1923–1930	Succeeded by George Franks
Preceded by	Colonel Commandant of the Royal Horse Artillery; 1930–1934	Succeeded by
