= Evelyn Fanshawe =

British Army general (1895–1979)

Major-General Sir Evelyn Fanshawe CB CBE
- Born: 25 May 1895; Bangalore, British India
- Died: 14 March 1979 (aged 83); Guilsborough House, Northampton, England
- Relatives: Sir Hew Dalrymple Fanshawe (father); Sir Evelyn Wood (grandfather)
- Military career
- Allegiance: United Kingdom
- Branch: British Army
- Service years: 1914–1945
- Rank: Major-General
- Service number: 9530
- Commands: Royal Armoured Corps Training Establishment (1942–1945); 20th Armoured Brigade (1940–1942); 20th Mechanical Cavalry Brigade (1939–1940); 2nd Dragoon Guards (Queen's Bays) (1935–1939)
- Conflicts: First World War; Second World War
- Awards: Companion of the Order of the Bath; Commander of the Order of the British Empire; Mentioned in Despatches
- Other work: Director of the International Refugee Organization in the British Zone of Germany; High Sheriff of Northamptonshire

Major-General Sir Evelyn Dalrymple Fanshawe, CB, CBE (25 May 1895 – 14 March 1979) was a British Army officer and the Director of the International Refugee Organization in the British Zone of Germany from 1948 to 1952.

== Family ==
A grandson of Sir Evelyn Wood, Fanshawe was born to (later Lieutenant General Sir) Hew Dalrymple Fanshawe and Anna Paulina Mary Wood in British India on 25 May 1895. He married Marie Harari in 1920, daughter of Sir Victor Harari.

== Military career ==
After being educated at The King's School, Canterbury and attending the Royal Military College, Sandhurst, Fanshawe was commissioned into the Queen's Bays in 1914 and saw service in France, Palestine, Mesopotamia, Persia, Russia and Syria during the First World War; among his assignments during this period was Aide-de-camp to his father, who was General Officer Commanding the British Cavalry Corps (1915). From 1915 to 1919 he was seconded to the Royal Flying Corps.

Fanshawe returned to his regiment as adjutant in 1919. In 1939 he was appointed commander of the 20th Armoured Brigade and, following promotion to major general, he was appointed commander of the Royal Armoured Corps Training Establishment from 1942 to the end of the war.

== Later career ==
Fanshawe retired from the army in 1945, whereupon he became the UN Relief and Rehabilitation Administration Director in the British Zone of Germany (1945–1948). Subsequently, he was Director of the International Refugee Organization in the British Zone of Germany from 1948 to 1952. In 1952 he was attached to the Dominion Countries UN Organisation Mission, and in 1960 was High Sheriff of Northamptonshire. He lived at Guilsborough House near Northampton.

== Bibliography ==
- Smart, Nick (2005). Biographical Dictionary of British Generals of the Second World War. Barnesley: Pen & Sword. ISBN 1844150496.
