= Harold Walker (British Army officer) =

British Army general

Lieutenant-General Sir Harold Walker KCB KCMG DSO
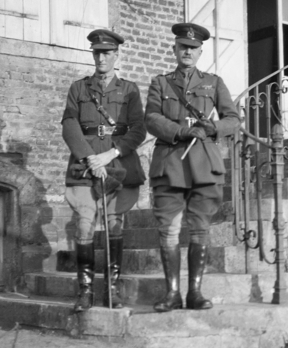
- Walker (right), pictured here as a major-general and GOC 1st Australian Division, along with Lieutenant Dean, his aide-de-camp, France, December 1917
- Born: 26 April 1862; Dilhorne, Staffordshire, England
- Died: 5 November 1934 (aged 72); Crediton, Devon, England
- Military career
- Allegiance: United Kingdom
- Branch: British Army
- Service years: 1884–1928
- Rank: Lieutenant-General
- Nickname: "Hooky"
- Units: North Staffordshire Regiment; Duke of Cornwall's Light Infantry; Border Regiment
- Commands: Southern Command, India (1924–1928); 48th (South Midland) Division (1918–1923); British Forces in Italy (1919); 1st Division (1915, 1916–1918); 1st Brigade (1915); 1st Battalion, Border Regiment (1908–1912); 4th Mounted Infantry Regiment (1900–1901)
- Conflicts: Mahdist War; Second Boer War; First World War: Gallipoli campaign; Battle of Lone Pine; Western Front; Battle of the Somme; Battle of Pozières; Battle of Passchendaele
- Awards: Knight Commander of the Order of the Bath; Knight Commander of the Order of St Michael and St George; Distinguished Service Order; Mentioned in Despatches (9); Croix de guerre (France)

Lieutenant-General Sir Harold Bridgwood Walker, KCB, KCMG, DSO (26 April 1862 – 5 November 1934) was a senior British Army commander who led Australian and New Zealand forces for much of the First World War. He was highly regarded by the men he commanded and was only replaced in 1918 when politics dictated that all divisions of the Australian Imperial Force should be commanded by Australians.

== Early life ==
Walker was born on 26 April 1862 in Dilhorne, North Staffordshire, England. His father was James Harold Walker, an Anglican clergyman, and his mother was Mary Walker (née Bridgwood). He was a descendant of George Walker. He was educated at Shrewsbury School and Jesus College, Cambridge. However, he did not graduate, having left before completing his degree.

== Early military career ==
Walker was commissioned into the British Army as a lieutenant into the 4th (Militia) Battalion of the Prince of Wales's (North Staffordshire Regiment) (later the North Staffordshire Regiment) on 20 May 1884, before transferring to the Duke of Cornwall's Light Infantry (DCLI), and the Regular Army, just under two years later, on 14 May 1884. With the DCLI, he served on the Nile Expedition in 1884 and 1885, and later with the mounted infantry. A supernumerary lieutenant, he became a lieutenant in July 1886.

In the 1890s, Walker continued to progress his way through the ranks, being promoted to captain on 16 December 1891, and served on the North West Frontier of India in 1897. In May 1898 he was seconded for service on the staff.

== Second Boer War ==
After the outbreak of the Second Boer War in South Africa in October 1899, Walker was ordered to transfer there on special service, and left Southampton on the SS Nile in March 1900. For his service he received the brevet rank of major on 29 November 1900 and was appointed a Companion of the Distinguished Service Order (DSO). He served during the latter part of the war in command of the 4th Mounted Infantry Battalion in South Africa.

== Inter-war years ==
Following the end of the war in June 1902, Walker returned home on the SS Kinfauns Castle in October, and received the substantive rank of major on 22 November 1902. In July 1903 he became assistant commandant of the School of Instruction for Mounted Infantry "where he displayed an aptitude as a trainer of troops that was to stand him in good stead during the Great War". In July 1904, where, after "twenty years’ service in the DCLI", he was promoted to the substantive rank of major upon his transferral to the Border Regiment. He was promoted to lieutenant colonel in July 1908 and assumed command of the 1st Battalion, Border Regiment, holding this post until his next promotion to colonel in March 1912. He was then made a GSO1 on the headquarters of a divisional staff.

== First World War ==
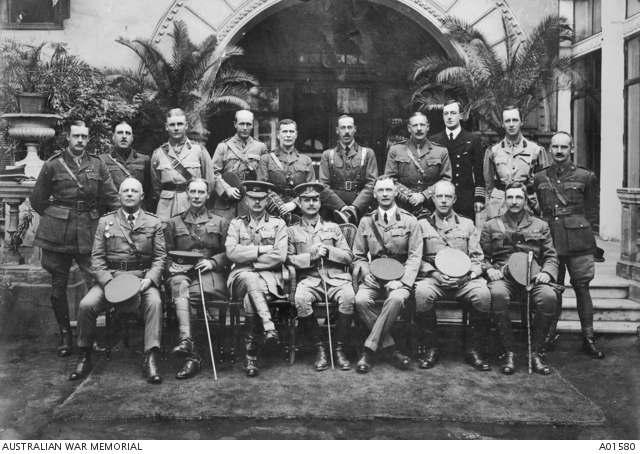
Group portrait of officers of the Australian and New Zealand Army Corps outside Shepheard's Hotel, Cairo, Egypt, March 1915. Seated in the front row, third from the left and next to Lieutenant General William Birdwood, the corps commander, is Brigadier General Walker, the corps' BGGS.

Before the outbreak of the First World War he was serving as a staff officer with the British Indian Army. When the headquarters of the Australian and New Zealand Army Corps began forming under Indian Army general William Birdwood, Walker was appointed as corps chief of staff with the temporary rank of brigadier general in December 1914.

=== Landing at Anzac ===
For the invasion of the Gallipoli peninsula, it was Walker's role to formulate the landing plans for ANZAC but he deferred management of the planning to his subordinate, Lieutenant-Colonel Andrew Skeen, who was an excellent staff officer. Walker was keen to hold a fighting command and his opportunity arose during the landing at Anzac Cove, 25 April 1915, when the commander of the New Zealand Infantry Brigade, Colonel Francis Earl Johnston, became ill. Walker had landed as Birdwood's representative on the beach and was instructed to assume command of the brigade which held the left flank of the Anzac perimeter, occupying a ridge that was given the name "Walker's Ridge". Walker relinquished command of the brigade when Johnston returned to duty but was soon after, on 30 April, given permanent command of the Australian 1st Infantry Brigade whose commander, Colonel H. N. MacLaurin, had been killed during the Turkish counter-attack of 27 April.

When on 15 May the senior Australian general, and commander of the 1st Australian Division, Major-General W. T. Bridges was killed by a sniper in Monash Valley, command of the 1st Division temporarily passed to Walker.

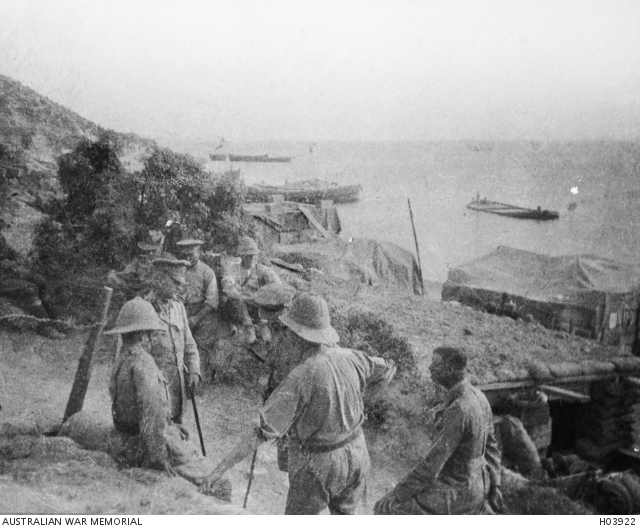
Allied officers conferring above Anzac Beach. On the left, with stick and wearing a peaked cap, is Brigadier General H. B. Walker, BGGS ANZAC Corps; sitting beside him is Lieutenant General Birdwood, GOC ANZAC.

According to the Australian official historian, Charles Bean, Walker was "an officer who, by his directness, his fighting qualities, and his consideration for his men, had in a few weeks much endeared himself to his troops." It was while Walker was in temporary command of the 1st Division that the Turks delivered a massive counter-attack on 19 May which failed to breach the Anzac line and resulted in over 10,000 casualties. The following day he oversaw an informal truce on MacLaurin's Hill during which time Turkish wounded were retrieved. Standing in no man's land, Walker conversed in French with some Turkish officers. When he saw the Turks start to collect rifles he called off the truce, stating that if an official armistice was desired a formal request should be made. (An armistice was eventually arranged for 24 May.) The Australian government desired an Australian to command the division and so dispatched from Australia the then current Chief of the General Staff, Colonel J. G. Legge, to take over command. Walker remained in the post until Legge arrived on 24 June 1915. When Legge was given command of the newly forming Australian 2nd Division on 26 July, Walker was promoted to the temporary rank of major general and restored to permanent command of the 1st Division, a post he would hold through the remainder of the Gallipoli campaign and much of the AIF's later campaigning on the Western Front.

=== Lone Pine ===
Walker now oversaw the 1st Division's preparations for the August Offensive in which the division would play a supporting role to the main attack by the New Zealand and Australian Division and the British IX Corps landing at Suvla. The 1st Division's main task was a diversionary attack at Lone Pine. A secondary action was an attack on German Officers' Trench from which Turkish machine guns enfiladed neighbouring positions, notably Quinn's Post and the Nek. Lone Pine became the only time during the campaign in which Anzac forces captured and held a Turkish trench system. The attack on German Officers' Trench was to be made at midnight, 7 August, by the Australian 6th Battalion (2nd Brigade), commanded by Lieutenant-Colonel H. G. Bennett. When the first attempt failed, Walker assumed that the attack had been mishandled and so ordered another attempt to be made. When this second attempt also failed, Walker, aware that failure here would jeopardise later attacks at other points, ordered a third attempt but upon receiving further negative reports, he approached Birdwood and got approval to call off the assault. It is from this episode that Walker learnt never to repeat an attack without modifying the plan to address the causes of its failure. On 29 September Walker was buried when a shell exploded in his dugout and two weeks later, on 13 October, he was severely wounded by a machine gun while visiting the front-line.

Walker was initially replaced by Brigadier-General Talbot Hobbs until he too fell sick, and then by Brigadier-General Harry Chauvel.

=== Western Front ===
In March 1916, following the evacuation of Allied forces from the Gallipoli peninsula, Walker, who in January was promoted to substantive major general, resumed command of the 1st Division and moved to France in April, initially on a quiet sector near Armentières.

With the Battle of the Somme going badly for the British, Birdwood's I Anzac Corps was called upon in mid-July, joining Lieutenant-General Sir Hubert Gough's Reserve Army. Gough tried to pressure Walker into making a hasty assault on Pozières but Walker refused, insisting on adequate preparation and delivering a successful attack on 23 July. Walker led the division during its two tours on the Pozières ridge and then later holding the line near Flers during the Somme winter.

In April 1917 Walker and the division's GSO1, Colonel T. A. Blamey, planned the capture of the fortified villages of Boursies, Hermies and Demicourt during the German retreat to the Hindenburg Line which preceded the Battle of Arras. Walker also led the 1st Division through numerous phases of the Battle of Passchendaele.

When the Germans launched their final offensives in 1918, Walker's 1st Division was attached as a reserve to General Sir Herbert Plumer's Second Army, and was instructed to build defences in front of Hazebrouck in Artois, where the division helped in halting the German Operation Georgette offensive.

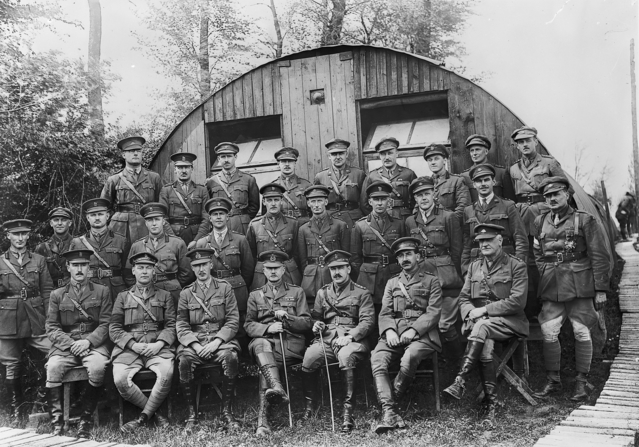
Group portrait of the staff of the 1st Australian Division, outside a Nissen hut somewhere in France, May 1918. The division's GOC, Major General Walker, is sat in the front row, fourth from the left, with his GSO1, Thomas Blamey, a future field marshal, sitting to his left.

It had long been a policy of the Australian government to have command positions in the Australian Imperial Force held by Australians or at least members of the AIF – Walker was neither. On 5 March 1918, General Birdwood informed the headquarters of the British Expeditionary Force (of which the Australian Corps was part) that all non-AIF commanders could be replaced by AIF officers once suitable positions in British Army units could be found. However, Birdwood insisted that Walker be the last officer to be replaced and so Walker was still in command of the 1st Division during the fighting at Hazebrouck.

When Birdwood was promoted to command of the reformed Fifth Army, in succession to Gough, Walker was next in line for the command of the Australian Corps but, believing an Australian should hold the post, he made no claim on the position which was eventually taken by Major General John Monash, former GOC of the 3rd Australian Division.

=== Italian Front ===
Finally, at the beginning of July 1918, Walker was given command of the 48th (South Midland) Division, which at the time was stationed on the Italian front, and remained in command of the division for the remainder of the war, taking over from Major General Sir Robert Fanshawe.

Under his leadership in October and November, the division participated in the Battle of Vittorio Veneto, a decisive Allied victory that led to the collapse of the Austro-Hungarian Army. His troops were the first British units to cross the pre-war Austrian border, advancing onto the Asiago Plateau and through the Val d'Assa to occupy the Trentino. During this offensive, the 48th Division captured 22,000 prisoners and over 600 guns. On 3 November, his forces secured the surrender of the entire staff of the Austrian III Corps.

== Later career ==
In July 1919, Walker returned to England was made commanded of the 48th (South Midland) Division, a division of the Territorial Force.

In January 1923 he was promoted to lieutenant general and in April he relinquished command of the 48th Division. In May he was made colonel of his old regiment, the DCLI. From March 1924 until 1 March 1928, when he gave up the appointment, he served as general officer commanding-in-chief, Southern Command, India. Unemployed, he was then placed on half-pay in March 1928 and retired from the army in May.

== Legacy ==
Walker Lines at Bodmin in Cornwall was a Second World war camp build as an extension to the DCLI Barracks. It was used to harbour men evacuated from Dunkirk and later to house troops for the D-Day landings. In the 1950s it was the site of the Joint Services School for Linguists. The site is now and industrial estate but still known as 'Walker Lines'.

== Personal life ==
In 1887, Walker married Harriet Edith Coulthard. Together they had two sons.

On 5 November 1934, Walker died in Crediton, Devon, England; he was aged 72. He was survived by his wife and children.

Military offices
Preceded by Sir Robert Fanshawe	GOC 48th (South Midland) Division; 1918–1923	Succeeded by Sir Percy Radcliffe
Preceded by Sir Andrew Skeen	GOC-in-C, Southern Command, India; 1924–1928	Succeeded by Sir William Heneker
