= Hew Fanshawe =

Lieutenant-General Sir Hew Fanshawe KCB KCMG
- Born: 30 October 1860; Clifton Hampden, Oxfordshire, England
- Died: 24 March 1957 (aged 96)
- Relatives: Major General Sir Robert Fanshawe (brother); Lieutenant General Sir Edward Fanshawe (brother); Field Marshal Sir Evelyn Wood (father-in-law); Major General Sir Evelyn Fanshawe (son)
- Military career
- Allegiance: United Kingdom
- Branch: British Army
- Service years: 1882–1920
- Rank: Lieutenant-General
- Commands: 18th Indian Division; 58th (2/1st London) Division; V Corps; Cavalry Corps; 1st Indian Cavalry Division; Jubbulpore Brigade; Presidency Brigade; 2nd Cavalry Brigade; 2nd Dragoon Guards (Queen's Bays)
- Conflicts: Anglo-Egyptian War; Nile Expedition; Second Boer War; First World War
- Awards: Knight Commander of the Order of the Bath; Knight Commander of the Order of St Michael and St George; Mentioned in despatches

Lieutenant-General Sir Hew Dalrymple Fanshawe, KCB, KCMG (30 October 1860 – 24 March 1957) was a British Army general of the First World War, who commanded V Corps on the Western Front and the 18th Indian Division in the Mesopotamian campaign. He was one of three brothers (Edward, Hew, and Robert) who all rose to high command during the war.

Fanshawe joined the 19th Hussars in 1882, and after seeing active duty in North Africa became the aide-de-camp to Sir Evelyn Wood, a prominent senior officer; he later married Wood's eldest daughter. He served with his regiment during the Second Boer War, and then commanded a cavalry regiment, followed by brigades in the Home Forces and in India.

Following the outbreak of the First World War, Fanshawe commanded a cavalry division and then the Cavalry Corps in France, before assuming command of V Corps in late 1915. He was removed from command in mid-1916, however, as a result of political manoeuvring following the attempt to find a scapegoat for the failed Actions of St Eloi Craters in March 1916. He later commanded the 18th Indian Division in Mesopotamia and was with it at the end of the war in the Middle East.

He retired from the army in 1920, and served as the ceremonial colonel of the Queen's Bays.

== Early career ==
Fanshawe was born on 30 October 1860, the son of the Reverend Henry Leighton Fanshawe, of Chilworth, Oxfordshire. He was the middle son of three brothers with significant military careers; Edward (b. 1859) joined the artillery and Robert (b. 1863) joined the infantry, all three rising to command corps or divisions during the First World War.

He attended Winchester College and then served in the Militia, being commissioned into the 3rd West Yorkshire Militia as a second lieutenant on 26 November 1879, being promoted to lieutenant on 7 August 1880.

He then gained a Regular Army commission in the 19th Hussars on 28 June 1882, in time to see action with the regiment at Kassassin (28 August) and Tel-el-Kebir (13 September) in the Anglo-Egyptian War. Fanshawe served in Egypt with his regiment until 1884, when he was promoted to captain, and then in the Sudan with the Nile Expedition until 1885. In February 1886 he served as his regiment's adjutant.

In February 1890, he left regimental duties and was seconded for service on the staff in order to be appointed as an aide-de-camp to Major General Sir Evelyn Wood, general officer commanding (GOC) of Aldershot Command. During his time working for Wood, he met his eldest daughter Pauline; the couple married in 1894, and had two sons and a daughter. One son, Evelyn, later commanded an armoured brigade during the Second World War. He returned to his regiment in 1893, with a promotion to major, and stayed with them until 1897, when he was appointed to a two-year term as an assistant military secretary in India.

Fanshawe served throughout the Second Boer War, where he received a brevet promotion to lieutenant colonel and was mentioned in despatches twice (including by Major General Lord Kitchener dated 23 June 1902). In January 1903 he was appointed in command of the 4th Provisional Regiment of Dragoons.

Following the war, in November 1903, he was confirmed in his promotion to lieutenant colonel and given command of the Queen's Bays. He was promoted to brevet colonel in September 1904. He held command of the regiment until April 1907, when he was promoted to colonel, as well as the temporary rank of brigadier general, and took over the 2nd Cavalry Brigade from Brigadier General The Hon. Sir Julian Byng. He was made a Companion of the Order of the Bath (CB) in the 1908 Birthday Honours in June 1908. After over three years in command of the brigade he was placed on half-pay in November 1910.

He was transferred to India later in the year, to command the Presidency Brigade in the Indian Lucknow Division, and was promoted to temporary brigadier general in December. In October 1913, he was promoted to major-general, with command of the Jubbulpore Brigade in the Mhow Division.

== First World War ==
Fanshawe was still serving in India with his brigade on the outbreak of the First World War in August 1914; whilst it remained in India, he was sent to France and given command of the 1st Indian Cavalry Division, a composite force drawn from the cavalry regiments of the various divisions, in December 1914. The following September, after receiving a temporary promotion to lieutenant-general the month before, he was transferred to command the Cavalry Corps, though by this point of the war, there was little role for cavalry in static trench warfare, and he moved to V Corps, a front-line corps, in October. During his time at the Cavalry Corps, his son Evelyn, served as his aide-de-camp.

At V Corps, Fanshawe oversaw the initial actions of St Eloi Craters in late March 1916; the attack under his command by the 3rd Division was successful, but terrible ground conditions made it hard for them or for the relieving troops in the Canadian Corps, to hold ground, and after a month of heavy losses, the line stabilised at the original positions. Such a situation would normally result in the divisional commanders being sacked; it was the 2nd Canadian Division under Major-General Richard Turner which had failed to hold the ground but for political reasons, the high command felt it impossible to sack a Canadian commander. Instead, Major-General Aylmer Haldane, GOC 3rd Division, was lined up as a scapegoat; Fanshawe tried to intervene with General Sir Douglas Haig, the commander-in-chief (C-in-C) of the British Expeditionary Force (BEF) on the Western Front, and was sacked on 4 July. His replacement at V Corps was, somewhat unusually, his elder brother Edward.

Later in 1916, Fanshawe took over the 58th (2/1st London) Division, but was subsequently "degummed" by Lieutenant General Sir Ivor Maxse, who reported:

This officer does not in my opinion command his division with either decision or knowledge. In the planning stage he plays a minor part and appears to have little influence on his subordinate commanders. ... He is not a good trainer, having little knowledge of the subject. But, if he had, I doubt whether he could either teach or enforce his views. I see no sign of grip or drive and think the division would be a very valuable one if placed in stronger hands.

He was replaced as the division's GOC by Major General Albemarle Cator, a much younger man. Having been sacked the previous year, it "seems that High Command had it in for Hew Fanshawe and he was made a scapegoat".

However, he found an opportunity for redemption in late 1917 when he was sent to the Middle East to command the 18th Indian Division. He led the division through the final stages of the Mesopotamian campaign, including the Battle of Sharqat in October 1918, the final major engagement against the Ottoman Empire before the Armistice of Mudros. He was appointed a Knight Commander of the Order of St Michael and St George (KCMG) in 1919 for his service in Mesopotamia.

== Later career ==
After the armistice which ended the fighting, Fanshawe was given command of an administrative area in France. He retired from the army in February 1920, with the honorary rank of lieutenant-general.

In retirement, he served as a justice of the peace in Oxfordshire, living near Thame, and was the ceremonial colonel of the Queen's Bays from June 1921, taking over from Major General William Henry Seymour, to 1930. He was promoted to Knight Commander of the Order of the Bath (KCB) in the 1925 Birthday Honours.

== Notes ==
Military offices
Preceded by Michael Rimington	General Officer Commanding the 1st Indian Cavalry Division; 1914–1915	Succeeded by
Preceded by	General Officer Commanding the Cavalry Corps; September – October 1915	Succeeded by
Preceded by Edmund Allenby	GOC V Corps; 1915–1916	Succeeded by Edward Fanshawe
Preceded by Edward Cooper	General Officer Commanding the 58th (2/1st London) Division; September – October 1916	Succeeded by Albemarle Cator
New command	General Officer Commanding the 18th Indian Division; 1917–1919	Succeeded by Theodore Fraser
Preceded by Sir William Henry Seymour	Colonel of the 2nd Dragoon Guards (Queen's Bays); 1921–1930	Succeeded by Sir Wentworth Harman
