= XXIII Corps (United Kingdom) =

- Active: World War I
- Country: United Kingdom
- Branch: British Army
- Type: Field corps
- Part of: Home Forces
- Engagements: Never deployed as a formation

The British XXIII Corps was a British infantry corps during World War I.

== History ==
British XXIII Corps was formed in the UK in February 1918 as a Home Forces formation to reinforce units in France.

== General Officers Commanding ==
Commanders included:

- 16 February – 7 May 1918 Lieutenant-General Sir William Pulteney
- 7 May – 5 August 1918 Lieutenant-General Sir Thomas Snow (temporary)
- 5 August 1918 – April 1919 Lieutenant-General Sir William Pulteney
