= Robert Fanshawe (British Army officer) =

Major-General Sir Robert Fanshawe KCB DSO
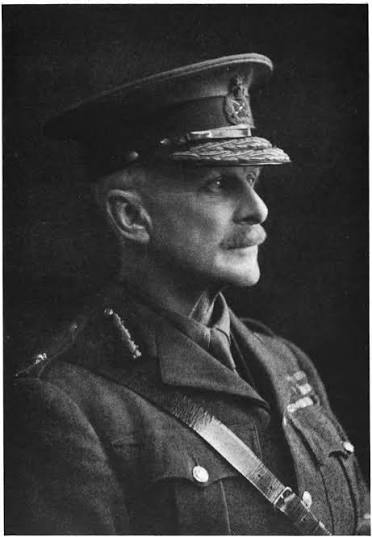
- Fanshawe in either the 1910s or 1920s
- Born: 5 November 1863; Buckinghamshire, England
- Died: 24 August 1946 (aged 82)
- Relatives: Sir Edward Fanshawe (brother); Sir Hew Dalrymple Fanshawe (brother)
- Military career
- Allegiance: United Kingdom
- Branch: British Army
- Service years: 1883–1919
- Rank: Major-General
- Nicknames: "Fanny" "The Chocolate Soldier"
- Unit: Oxfordshire Light Infantry
- Commands: 69th (2nd East Anglian) Division; 48th (South Midland) Division; 6th Infantry Brigade; 2nd Battalion, Oxfordshire and Buckinghamshire Light Infantry
- Conflicts: Tirah campaign Second Boer War; First World War
- Awards: Knight Commander of the Order of the Bath; Distinguished Service Order; Mentioned in Despatches (10); War Merit Cross (Italy)

Major-General Sir Robert Fanshawe, KCB, DSO (5 November 1863 – 24 August 1946) was a British Army officer, who commanded the 48th (South Midland) Division from 1915 to 1918 during the First World War. He was the youngest of three brothers (Edward, Hew, and Robert) who all rose to command divisions or corps during the war.

Fanshawe joined the Oxfordshire Light Infantry in 1883, and served with his regiment in India until the Second Boer War in the late 1880s, where he commanded a mobile column and was mentioned in despatches. At the outbreak of the First World War he was on the staff of the British Expeditionary Force (BEF), and later commanded a regular brigade on the Western Front, before being promoted to divisional command in 1915. He commanded the 48th (South Midland) Division for three years, including service at the Somme, Ancre, Passchendale, and on the Italian Front, before being removed from command after his corps commander objected to his defensive strategy. He was relegated to commanding a second-line home service division, and retired from the army in 1918.

== Early military career ==
Fanshawe was born in 1863, the youngest son of the Reverend Henry Leighton Fanshawe, of Chilworth, Oxfordshire. He was the younger son of three brothers with significant military careers; Edward (b. 1859) joined the artillery and Hew (b. 1860) joined the cavalry, all three rising to command corps or divisions during the First World War.

After attending Marlborough College and the Royal Military College, Sandhurst, Fanshawe joined the 2nd Battalion of the newly formed Oxfordshire Light Infantry, the former 52nd (Oxfordshire) Regiment of Foot, as a lieutenant in August 1883. He spent the next sixteen years with his regiment, primarily on service in India, during which he was promoted to captain in May 1892, and later served in the Tirah campaign of 1897–1898.

Fanshawe entered the Staff College, Camberley at the beginning of 1899, but following the outbreak of the Second Boer War, he was sent to South Africa that November, to serve on the inspector general's staff. He saw service at the relief of Kimberley and the Battle of Paardeberg (February 1900), where he was wounded in action; later, in April 1900, he was made a deputy assistant adjutant general (DAAG) of the 6th Battalion of mounted infantry, and on 2 September 1900 promoted to major. In 1901, he took command of a mobile column, which he commanded to the end of the war. He received the local rank of lieutenant colonel whilst holding this command, on 27 January 1902. For his service in South Africa, he was mentioned in despatches twice and awarded the Distinguished Service Order (DSO).

Following the end of the war in June 1902, Fanshawe returned to the United Kingdom in the SS Dunottar Castle, which arrived at Southampton the following month. In September 1902 Fanshawe was posted to the staff of the 4th Division on Salisbury Plain as deputy assistant adjutant-general (DAAG), after he received the brevet promotion to lieutenant colonel on 22 August 1902. He returned to his regiment in 1903. Promoted to the full rank of lieutenant colonel in September 1907, he became commanding officer (CO) of the regiment's 2nd Battalion from 1907 to 1911, during which he became a brevet colonel in March 1908.

In September 1911, after relinquishing command of the battalion to Henry Rodolph Davies, he was promoted to colonel and placed on half-pay. This only lasted until November when he was posted as general staff officer, grade 1 (GSO1, or chief of staff in most modern armies) to the 1st Division, then commanded by Major General Samuel Lomax.

== First World War ==
At the outbreak of the First World War in 1914, Fanshawe's division was mobilised as part of the British Expeditionary Force (BEF) for service in France. As senior staff officer of the 1st Division, he essentially acted as the division's chief of staff during the Battle of Mons and the subsequent Great Retreat. He continued in this role through the First Battle of the Marne and in the early stages of the First Battle of the Aisne.

On 20 September, he was appointed a temporary brigadier-general to command the 6th Infantry Brigade, part of the 2nd Division, in succession to Richard Hutton Davies. Fanshawe led the brigade through the First Battle of Ypres throughout October and November and the Battle of Festubert in early 1915, where it played a key part in the initial successful night attack. He was made a Companion of the Order of the Bath "in recognition of the meritorious services" in February 1915.

In mid-June, after being promoted to major general "for distinguished service in the Field", he took over command of the 48th (South Midland) Division, a Territorial Force (TF) formation, after its previous general officer commanding (GOC), Major-General Henry Heath, fell ill. Major-General Henry Horne, GOC 2nd Division from January 1915 onwards (and who would eventually rise to command the First Army of the BEF), wrote in a letter to his wife on 30 May, in which he mentioned Fanshawe:

I am sorry to say I am losing General R. Fanshawe, the one who commands the 6th Infantry Brigade, not the gunner one. He has been promoted to command the South Midland Division – Territorial – which is & has been I think for some time, in this country. He is a great loss as he was very excellent, but I am glad he has got his reward.

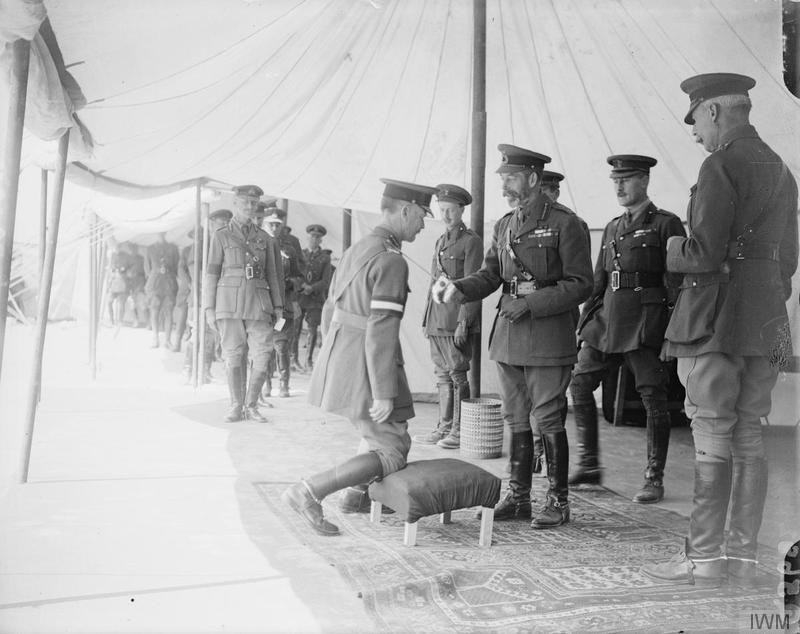
Major-General Robert Fanshawe being knighted in the field at Albert, France, by King George V, 12 July 1917.

Fanshawe was to command the division for almost three years, at the Battle of the Somme the next year, the Battle of the Ancre, and the Battle of Passchendaele, then on the Italian Front from late 1917 onwards, including during the Austrian offensives of June 1918.

Fanshawe spent a good deal of time visiting front-line units, where he "liked to drift into the trench in an old raincoat so that men were not intimidated" and would sometimes venture out with a single escort to patrol no-man's land. More unusually, he had a habit of giving his soldiers chocolates when he met them returning from the lines or on inspections. Such behaviour scandalised his staff officers, who were privately disapproving of Fanshawe's informality with his troops but it did not lead to the disapproval of his superiors; in September 1917, a confidential report by Lieutenant-General Ivor Maxse, his corps commander, had judged him to be "a good average divisional commander and trainer".

Fanshawe was strongly in favour of elastic defence, where a lightly garrisoned front line would delay an enemy attack, and then a strong counter-attack would recapture lost ground, and had been training 48th Division in this mould since he took command in 1915; the Italian theatre was the first opportunity to put this approach fully into practice.

The 48th Division was attacked on 15 June 1918 by the Austrians at the Second Battle of the Piave River; in keeping with the plan, leading elements fell back and a counter-attack was organised, recapturing the lost ground and stalling the offensive entirely.

Whilst a success, this result was greeted with dismay by the commander of the British forces in Italy, Lieutenant General The Earl of Cavan; he was a believer in a more traditional strongly held static line of defence and felt that Fanshawe did not need to have given up any ground at all. Fanshawe was quickly relieved of his command and ordered home, leaving Italy four days after the end of the battle, on 20 June. Major General Harold Walker, formerly the GOC of the 1st Australian Division, arrived as Fanshawe's successor on 4 July.

Francis Mackay wrote that it was the dismissal of a general who had a sound defensive plan applied by officers and men of high morale and confidence.

- The Italians, senior partners at Asiago, frequently sacked senior officers who had suffered setbacks in battle. Lord Cavan, who succeeded General Sir Herbert Plumer as GOC of the British Forces in Italy in March 1918, may have played a political and unpleasant hand in dismissing Fanshawe.
- Cavan thought that, after his briefing of 14 June, Fanshawe should have reinforced the front line in the face of an expected Austrian attack. Cavan had also failed to spot the weaknesses and did not change the battle disposition when he visited Fanshawe at his battle headquarters.
- As a commander, Fanshawe allowed his troops to suffer unnecessary casualties, which, in 1918, was a cause for dismissal. This was due to an increasingly severe shortage of manpower that was beginning to affect operations.
- Despite preparations for a British attack, there was no British artillery support to stem the Austrian advance.

MacKay also reports that the Official History records that Fanshawe may have lost his grip on the battle on the morning of 15 June 1918.

Fanshawe was respected throughout the 48th Division. Charles Carrington, a junior officer who served as an infantry platoon commander with the Royal Warwickshire Regiment, described Fanshawe as "the kindest hearted old swashbuckler in the army." He trained his commanders to use their initiative in the Battle of the Woods and Clouds, where lines of sight and communications were very limited. He left, uncomplainingly, gentlemanly to the end and did not see further active service. Nevertheless, there were many officers in the 48th Division who complained for years about his dishonourable treatment.

Fanshawe was appointed to command the 69th Division on home service in November 1918, the same month as the armistice with Germany.

Throughout the war, he had been mentioned in despatches eight times, as well as knighted in June 1917.

== After the war ==
Fanshawe oversaw the gradual disbandment of the 69th Division following the Armistice with Germany on 11 November and the division was officially broken up in March 1919. Having no further active appointment, he retired from the army, after nearly forty years of service, in August.

He did not sever all ties with the army, however, as he later served as the honorary colonel of the 7th Battalion, Worcestershire Regiment, a Territorial unit that had formed part of his old 48th Division. He relinquished this assignment in July 1929 and ceased to belong to the reserve of officers in November 1930.

He died in August 1946, aged eighty-two, after falling from his horse, and is buried near Oxford.

== Sources ==
- "FANSHAWE, Maj.-Gen. Sir Robert", in Who Was Who (Online ed.). London: A & C Black. 2007.
- Obituary notice in The Times, 26 August 1946, p. 7
- Wright, Philip Lowndes (1920). The First Buckinghamshire Battalion, 1914–1919. Hazell, Watson & Viney.
- Robbins, Simon (2005). British generalship on the Western Front 1914–18: defeat into victory. Routledge. ISBN 0-415-35006-9.
- Robbins, Simon (2009). The First World War Letters of General Lord Horne. History Press for the Army Records Society. ISBN 978-0752454634.
- Cassar, George H. (1998). The forgotten front: the British campaign in Italy, 1917–1918. Continuum. ISBN 1-85285-166-X.
- Ashworth, Tony (2000). Trench warfare, 1914–1918: the live and let live system. Pan Macmillan. ISBN 0-330-48068-5.
- Wilks, Eileen; Wilks, John (1998). The British Army in Italy 1917-1918. Pen and Sword, 1998. ISBN 978-1-78346-171-4.
- Plews, Derek A. (2024). A Brilliant Little Victory: The 48th (South Midland) Division on the Western and Italian Fronts During the First World War. Helion. ISBN 978-1804514290.

Military offices
Preceded by Henry Heath	GOC 48th (South Midland) Division; 1915–1918	Succeeded by Harold Walker
Preceded by Charles Ross	GOC 69th (2nd East Anglian) Division; 1918–1919	Post disbanded
