= Dempsey =

Origin
- Language: Irish
- Derivation: díomasach
- Meaning: proud
- Region of origin: Ireland

Other names
- Variant form: Ó Díomasaigh
- Anglicisation: Proudman

Dempsey is a surname of Irish origin.

== Background ==
Dempsey is an anglicised form of Ó Díomasaigh, 'descendant of Díomasach'; this personal name is the Irish adjective díomasach 'proud'. The family originated in the Kingdom of Uí Failghe.

According to John Grenham:

In the original Irish Dempsey is Ó Diomasaigh, from diomasach, meaning "proud" or "arrogant". The name was also occasionally anglicised "Proudman". The Ó Diomasaigh originated in the territory of Clanmalier, on the borders of what are now counties Laois and Offaly, and remained powerful in the area until the seventeenth century. In the 12th century, Henry II set his court up in Dublin and summoned the Leinster Chiefs. The O’Dempsey, Chief of Offaly, refused to attend. Strongbow together with his son-in-law De Quincy marched into the O'Dempsey territory to take land by force. In a famous battle the O'Dempsey together with his followers routed the Normans with great slaughter, an action that kept the Normans out of the Dempsey territories for over 300 years. In later years, their allegiance was to the English and they were involved with the newcomers in the massacre of the O’Lalors in Laois in 1577, an action which local tradition says was responsible for their later losses. Sir Terence: son of Dermod Ruadh; was knighted in May 1599 for services to the Crown by Robert Devereux, earl of Essex, lord lieutenant of Ireland; Charles the first recognised the strength of the family by granting the English titles of Viscount Clanmaliera and Baron Philipstown in 1631 to Terence O'Dempsey. (PJ Goode – The O'Dempsey Chronicles) The loyalty of the family to the Crown was short-lived, however, and the Williamite wars later in the century destroyed their power and scattered them.

Another source states:

The O'Dempsey family derive their name from Diummasach, an 11th-century Uí Failge prince of the Clann Máel Ugra, aka Cenél Maoilughra. The Clann Máel Úgra, in turn, took their name from Máelaugrai, an Uí Failge chieftain who flourished in the middle of the 9th century. The center of their territory, anglicized Clanmalier, was near Ballybrittas in northeast Co. Leix. Their power later extended into the barony of Upper Phillipstown. O'Donovan, in his Ordnance Survey letters, places Clann-Maoilughra in the present Barony of Upper Philipstown in the King's County and the Barony of Portnahinch in the Queen's County.

According to historian C. Thomas Cairney, the O'Dempseys were one of the chiefly families of the Ui Failghe who in turn were a tribe from the Dumnonii or Laigin who were the third wave of Celts to settle in Ireland during the first century BC.

== Descent ==
An Ó Diomasaigh genealogy records the following:

Flann m. Máel Ruanaid m. Cellaich m. Máel Augra m. Conchobuir m. Áeda m. Tomaltajich m. Flaind m. Díumasaich m. Congaile m. Forannáin m. Congaile m. Máel h-Umai m. Cathail m. Bruidge m. Nath Í m. Rosa Failgi.

The final person may be identical with Failge Berraide (fl. 507–514), a king of the Uí Failghe and of Laigin descent.

== Dempseys in the annals ==
The Irish annals list a number of members of the family:

- 789: Áedh [grandfather of Máelaugrai] was slain by Óengus son of Mugrón, king of Uí Failghe, in the oratory of Kilclonfert.
- 1141: Donnchadh, son of Goll Gaibhle, i.e. Ua Conchobhair Failghe, was killed by the Uí Failghe themselves, i.e. the Clann-Maelughra.
- 1161: Domhnall, son of Conghalach, son of Cuaifne Ua Conchobhair Failghe, Tanist of Uí Failghe, was slain by the Clann-Maelughra.
- 1164: Maelseachlainn Ua Conchobhair Failghe, was slain by the Clann-Maelughra.
- 1193: Diarmait, son of Cubrogam Ua Diumasaigh, chief of Clann-Mailighra and king of Uí Failghe for a long time, died.
- 1383: Dermot O'Dempsy, Lord of Kinel-Maoilughra, was slain by the English.
- 1394: Thomas O'Dempsy, heir to the lordship of Clann-Maoilughra, was slain by the English.

== Other Dempsey families ==
An unrelated family, rendered in Irish as Mac Diomasaigh, are found in County Antrim and its neighbouring counties.

== People with the surname ==
Notable people with the surname Dempsey include:

- Amy Dempsey (born 1963), American art historian
- Bill Dempsey (1942–2026), former Australian rules footballer
- Bill Dempsey (footballer) (1896–1967), English footballer
- Candace Dempsey, American author, journalist and travel writer
- Cedric Dempsey (1932–2025), American sports executive
- Chester Dempsey (1896–1969) American farmer and politician
- Clint Dempsey (born 1983), American soccer player
- Courtenay Dempsey (born 1987), Australian rules footballer
- Damien Dempsey, Irish singer and songwriter
- Dan Dempsey, Australian rugby league footballer
- Denis Dempsey (1826–1896), Irish soldier, recipient of the Victoria Cross
- Donald Dempsey (c. 1932 – 2005), American recording executive
- Ed Dempsey, Canadian ice hockey coach
- Frank Dempsey (1925–2013), American football player
- Gary Dempsey, multiple people
- George Dempsey, multiple people
- Girvan Dempsey (born 1975), Irish rugby union footballer
- Henry Dempsey, pilot who survived being sucked out of an airborne Beechcraft 99 aircraft in 1987
- Holli Dempsey, British actor
- Ian Dempsey (born 1961), Irish radio presenter
- Jack Dempsey (1895–1983), American boxer
- Jack Dempsey (disambiguation), other people with this name
- Jakobe' Dempsey (born 1998) American actor
- James Dempsey (disambiguation), multiple people
- Jesse Dempsey (born 2005), Irish footballer
- Jillian Dempsey (born 1991), American ice hockey player
- Jillian Lee Dempsey, American inorganic chemist
- John Dempsey, multiple people
- Judy Dempsey (born 1956), Irish journalist and researcher
- Julia Dempsey (known as Sister Mary Joseph Dempsey), American religious sister, nurse and hospital administrator
- Kyle Dempsey (born 1995) English footballer
- Lawrence Dempsey (died 1690), an Irish soldier
- Lorcan Dempsey (born 1958), Irish library information expert
- Luke Dempsey (born 1979/1980), Irish Gaelic football manager
- Mark Dempsey, multiple people
- Martin Dempsey (born 1952), American general, 18th chairman, US Joint Chiefs of Staff
- Michael Dempsey, multiple people
- Mick Dempsey, Irish Gaelic footballer
- Miles Dempsey (1896–1969), British general of World War II
- Nathan Dempsey (born 1974), Canadian ice hockey player
- Nick Dempsey (born 1980), English windsurfer
- Nicola Dempsey (fl. 2015–), one half of comedy duo Flo and Joan
- Noel Dempsey (born 1953), Irish politician
- Nonpareil Dempsey (1862–1895), ring name of Irish-born American boxer John Kelly
- Ollie Dempsey (born 2003) Australian rules footballer
- Patrick Dempsey (born 1966), American actor and race car driver
- Paul Dempsey (born 1976), Australian rock musician
- Ray Dempsey, Irish Gaelic footballer
- Rey Dempsey, retired American college football coach
- Richard Dempsey (born 1974), English actor
- Rick Dempsey (born 1949), retired American baseball player
- Rosemary Dempsey, American feminist activist
- Rosie Dempsey (fl. 2015–), one half of comedy duo Flo and Joan
- Sandra Dempsey, Canadian playwright
- Sandy Dempsey (1949–1975), actress
- Simon Dempsey (born 1976) English professional combat sports coach
- Shawna Dempsey, Canadian performance artist
- S. Wallace Dempsey (1862–1949), American Republican politician, Congressman 1915–1931
- Thomas Dempsey (disambiguation) or Tom Dempsey, multiple people
- Tommy Dempsey, American college basketball coach
- Tony Dempsey (politician) (born 1944), Irish Fianna Fáil politician, TD 2002–2007
- Tracy Dempsey (born 1950), American politician from West Virginia
- Travis Demsey, born Travis Dempsey, Australian musician
- Wally Dempsey (1944–2024), American football player
- Guy Dempsey, American Historian and Author

As a given name:

- Dempsey Bob (born 1948), Canadian woodcarver
- Dempsey Burges (1751–1800), American politician, Congressman 1795–1799
- Dempsey Wilson (1927–1971), American racecar driver
- P. Dempsey Tabler (1876–1956), American actor, athlete and businessman

Fictional Characters:

- "Tank" Dempsey (born before 1917), fictional U.S Marine from Call of Duty: Black Ops's Zombies mode
- Zach Dempsey, a character in the novel and Netflix series 13 Reasons Why

== See also ==
- Irish clans
