= General Dempsey =

General Dempsey may refer to:

- Martin Dempsey, U.S. Army General and 18th Chairman of the U.S. Joint Chiefs of Staff
- Sir Miles Dempsey (1896–1969), British Army general, and commander of the British Second Army during the Invasion of Normandy during World War II

== See also ==
- Dempsey
