= John Dempsey =

John Dempsey may refer to:

== Sports ==
- John Dempsey (footballer, born 1946) (1964–2024), Republic of Ireland international football (soccer) player
- John Dempsey (footballer, born 1951), Tranmere Rovers player
- John Dempsey (umpire) (born 1965), New Zealand cricket umpire

== Politicians ==
- John J. Dempsey (1879–1958), American politician, governor of New Mexico
- John N. Dempsey (1915–1989), American politician, governor of Connecticut

== Others ==
- John Dempsey (lyricist), also playwright
- John Dempsey (Medal of Honor) (1848–1884), American sailor and Medal of Honor recipient
- John Church Dempsey (1802–1877), English portrait artist

== See also ==
- Jack Dempsey (disambiguation)
- John Dempsey Hoblitzell, American politician
