= Lewis O'Dempsey, 2nd Viscount Clanmalier =

Irish aristocrat

Lewis O'Dempsey, 2nd Viscount Clanmalier (died 1683) was an Irish aristocrat of the seventeenth century.

He was descended from the Gaelic Dempsey sept of Leinster who had secured their lands in Queen's County through the surrender and regrant policy during the Tudor era. His grandfather Terence O'Dempsey, a long-standing sheriff of Queen's County, had been made a viscount in 1631. Because of the early death of his father Owny (or Anthony) O'Dempsey, Lewis succeeded his grandfather as the second viscount in 1638. His mother was Mary Nugent, daughter of Christopher Nugent, sixth Baron Delvin, and sister of Richard Nugent, 1st Earl of Westmeath.

Although his grandfather appears to have conformed to the Protestant Church of Ireland, Lewis was a Roman Catholic. He was accused of taking part in the Irish Rebellion of 1641 and was attainted by the Irish Parliament the following year. After the Cromwellian conquest of Ireland he was accordingly dispossessed of his estates in Kings and Queens County by the English republicans. Although he was subsequently declared innocent of many of the charges against him following the Restoration in 1660, he struggled to have his estates returned to him. Nonetheless he was restored to his title of Viscount in 1662.

He was married twice. His first wife was Martha Itchingham, daughter of John Itchingham of Dunbrody, County Wexford. Her mother Margaret Whitly had married Lewis' grandfather, the 1st Viscount Clanmalier, then an old man, after her first husband's death. His second wife was Dorothy Molloy, the daughter of Colonel Charles Molloy of County Offaly, whom he married in 1671. He was succeeded by his son Maximilian O'Dempsey, 3rd Viscount Clanmalier.

He was a cousin of the Irish Jacobite leader Patrick Sarsfield.

== Bibliography ==
- Ciaran Brady & Jane Ohlmeyer. British Interventions in Early Modern Ireland. Cambridge University Press, 2005.

Peerage of Ireland
Preceded by Terence O'Dempsey	Viscount Clanmalier; 1638–1683	Succeeded by Maximilian O'Dempsey
