= Miles Dempsey =

British Army general (1896–1969)

General Sir Miles Dempsey GBE KCB DSO MC DL
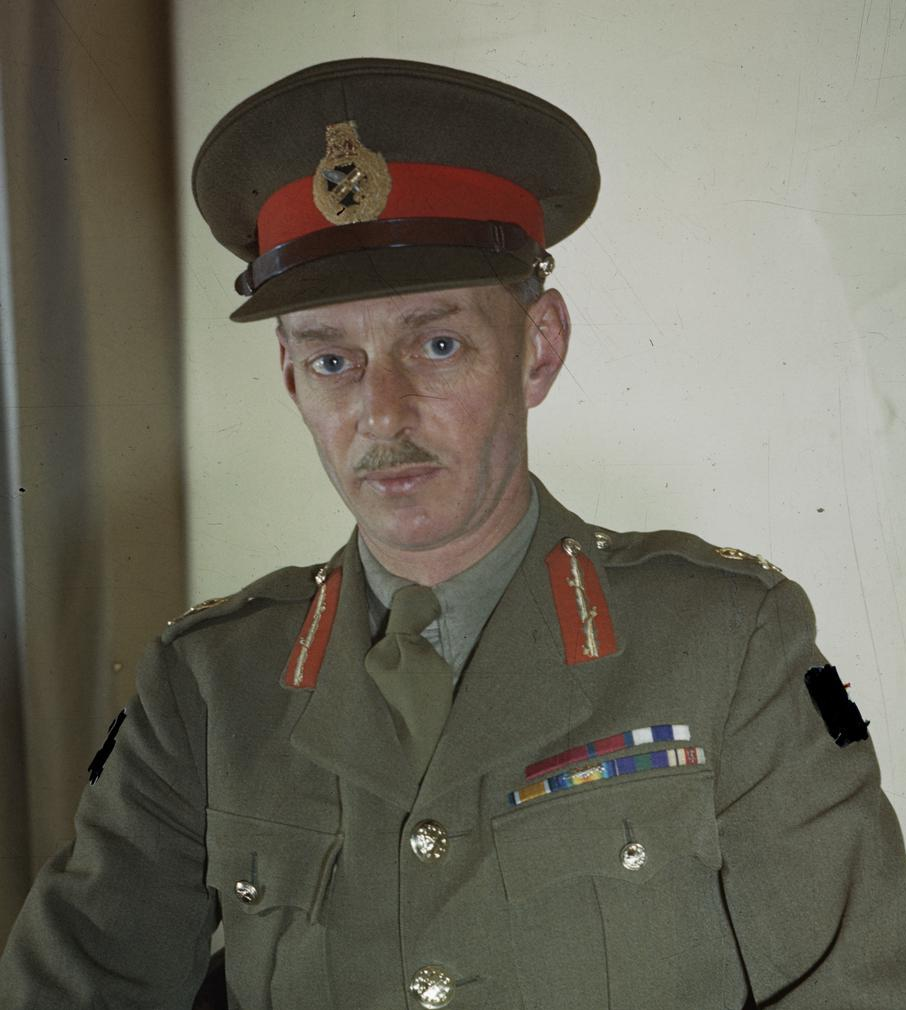
- Dempsey in April 1944
- Born: 15 December 1896; New Brighton, Wallasey, Cheshire, England
- Died: 5 June 1969 (aged 72); Yattendon, Berkshire, England
- Military career
- Allegiance: United Kingdom
- Branch: British Army
- Service years: 1915–1947
- Rank: General
- Nickname: "Bimbo"
- Service number: 9391
- Unit: Royal Berkshire Regiment
- Commands: Middle East Land Forces (1946–47); Allied Land Forces, South East Asia (1945–46); Fourteenth Army (1945); Second Army (1944–45); XIII Corps (1942–44); 42nd Armoured Division (1941–42); 42nd (East Lancashire) Infantry Division (1941); 46th Infantry Division (1941); 13th Infantry Brigade (1939–40); 1st Battalion, Royal Berkshire Regiment (1938–39)
- Conflicts: First World War: Battle of Delville Wood; Battle of Cambrai; German spring offensive; Hundred Days Offensive; Iraqi revolt of 1920; Russian Civil War; Second World War: Battle of France; Allied invasion of Sicily; Battle of Normandy; Allied advance from Paris to the Rhine; Operation Market Garden; Western Allied invasion of Germany; Greek Civil War; Palestine Emergency
- Awards: Knight Grand Cross of the Order of the British Empire; Knight Commander of the Order of the Bath; Companion of the Distinguished Service Order; Military Cross; Mentioned in Despatches (4); Army Distinguished Service Medal (United States); Commander of the Legion of Merit (United States); Grand Officer of the Order of Leopold with Palm (Belgium); Croix de guerre with Palm (Belgium); Knight Grand Officer of the Order of Orange-Nassau with Swords (Netherlands)

General Sir Miles Christopher Dempsey, GBE, KCB, DSO, MC, DL (15 December 1896 – 5 June 1969) was a senior British Army officer who served in both world wars. During the Second World War he commanded the Second Army in northwest Europe. A highly professional career soldier who made his reputation in active service, Dempsey was highly thought of by both his subordinates and superiors, most notably Bernard Montgomery, but is not well known.

A 1915 graduate of the Royal Military College, Sandhurst, Dempsey was commissioned as a second lieutenant in the Royal Berkshire Regiment. As a junior officer, he fought on the Western Front during the First World War, where he was wounded, and was awarded the Military Cross. After the war, he served in Iraq during the Iraqi revolt of 1920, in Iran during the Russian Civil War, and in India.

During the Second World War, Dempsey formed a close relationship with Montgomery. He commanded the 13th Brigade in the Battle of France in 1940, and then spent the next two years training troops in England. He commanded the Eighth Army's XIII Corps in the Allied invasions of Sicily and Italy in 1943. He commanded the Second Army during the Battle of Normandy and made rapid advances in the subsequent campaign in Northern France and Belgium.

After the war, he commanded the Fourteenth Army in the Far East, and the Middle East Command during the Greek Civil War and the Palestine Emergency. He retired from the Army in 1947, and was involved in horse racing. He bred and raced his own horses, and was chairman of the Racecourse Betting Control Board from 1947 to 1951.

== Early life and military career ==
Miles Christopher Dempsey was born in New Brighton, Wallasey, Cheshire, on 15 December 1896, the third and youngest son of Arthur Francis, a marine insurance broker, and his wife Margaret Maud De La Fosse, the daughter of Major-General Henry De La Fosse. Dempsey was the descendant of a clan in County Offaly and County Laois in Ireland. His ancestor Terence O'Dempsey had been knighted on the field of battle by Robert Devereux, 2nd Earl of Essex on 22 May 1599, and was created Viscount Clanmalier in 1631. Maximilian O'Dempsey, 3rd Viscount Clanmalier, was loyal to the Catholic King James II and, as a result, was attainted, and the family lost all their lands in 1691. Dempsey's branch of the family left Ireland and by the mid-19th century had settled in Cheshire.

When Dempsey was six years old, his father killed himself, after which the family moved to Crawley in Sussex. Dempsey was educated at Shrewsbury School, entering there in 1911. He captained the first eleven cricket team in the 1914 season, when they did not lose a match. He was a school and house monitor, and played in the second eleven football team. He attended Officers' Training Corps camp at Rugeley, reaching the rank of sergeant by 1914. The Great War broke out in August of that year, and in October he left Shrewsbury to enter the Royal Military College, Sandhurst, at the age of 17. He graduated in February 1915 and was commissioned as a second lieutenant into the Royal Berkshire Regiment.

Promoted to lieutenant in August, Dempsey attended training courses until he reached the age of 19 and was eligible to proceed overseas. He served on the Western Front with the 1st Battalion, Royal Berkshires, from June 1916 onwards. The battalion was part of the 99th Brigade of the 2nd Division. Dempsey, serving as a platoon commander in D Company, first saw action during the Battle of Delville Wood in late July 1916, part of the larger Somme offensive. Although successful, the battalion suffered heavy casualties, including eight officers. It was relieved in the line and saw little further fighting that year. Dempsey was promoted to the acting rank of captain and assumed command of D Company, and later B Company. In November the battalion took part in an assault on Munich Trench, near the River Serre. As at Delville Wood earlier in the year, the assault was successful but with heavy losses, although Dempsey again remained unscathed, and soon returned to England for home leave. On 8 February 1917 he became the adjutant of the battalion.

Following attacks near Miraumont and then Oppy in April, the battalion, badly understrength, remained in a quiet sector of the front for most of the year and was temporarily merged with the 23rd (Service) Battalion, Royal Fusiliers. Dempsey was posted as a staff officer at II Corps headquarters (HQ), before returning to the 1st Royal Berkshires, this time in command of A Company. In late November the battalion attacked Bourlon Wood as part of the Battle of Cambrai.

On 12 March 1918, as the Germans prepared to launch their Spring Offensive, they laid down a heavy mustard gas barrage on Dempsey's battalion, which was now at Lavacquerie with Dempsey commanding D Company. Dempsey, along with 10 other officers and 250 other ranks, was gassed and later evacuated to England, where he had a lung removed. He returned to the battalion on 6 July, where, with the tide of the war having turned, the 1st Royal Berkshires took part in the Hundred Days Offensive until the war ended with the armistice of 11 November 1918. Dempsey served as adjutant again from 5 October to 4 November. Dempsey was mentioned in despatches on 8 November 1918, and awarded the Military Cross, which was gazetted in the King's Birthday Honours list on 3 June 1919.

== Between the wars ==
After the war ended, the 1st Royal Berkshires served in the Allied occupation of the Rhineland. On 16 February 1919, Dempsey returned to the UK on leave. During the summer he played two first-class cricket matches for Sussex against Oxford University and Northamptonshire.

The 1st Battalion was re-formed at Chiseldon Camp in Wiltshire in June, and Dempsey rejoined it. In September it was sent to Iraq, where it helped suppress the Iraqi revolt of 1920. The following August, it moved to Iran, where it formed part of North Persia Force (Norperforce) in the Russian Civil War. While his battalion was stationed in Iran, Dempsey took up Pelmanism. In late 1921 it moved again, this time to Bareilly, India, and Dempsey took over C Company. In 1922 he returned to England for his first leave in almost three years. He went back to India later in the year before returning to England again in 1923, this time to take up an appointment at the Royal Military College, Sandhurst.

While at Sandhurst, Dempsey commanded No. 1 Platoon of No. 1 Company, which was commanded by Major Richard O'Connor, who was later to serve under Dempsey. Another who he would later encounter, and become great friends with, was Frederick Browning, then a captain and the college's adjutant. Dempsey remained in this post until 1927 when he returned to duties with his regiment. This time he was posted to the 2nd Battalion, which was serving in Germany as part of the British Army of the Rhine (BAOR). Dempsey took over B Company, and spent a large amount of his time travelling, mainly by bicycle, around Europe, visiting battlefields of old wars, as well as likely scenes of battle in any future conflicts. The 2nd Battalion returned to the UK in 1928. Between 1926 and 1932, he played Minor Counties Championship cricket for Berkshire. He also played football and hockey.

In January 1930, Dempsey was admitted to the Staff College, Camberley, graduating in December 1931. His fellow students in the Junior Division included numerous future general officers, including William Gott, George Hopkinson, George Symes, Maurice Chilton, Walter Mallaby, Stuart Rawlins and John Nichols. The Senior Division attending from 1929 to 1930 included Neil Ritchie, Herbert Lumsden, George Erskine, Ivor Hughes, Reginald Denning, Harold Redman and Ian Playfair, while in Dempsey's second year, the Junior Division, attending from 1931 to 1932, included Brian Horrocks, Sidney Kirkman, Frank Simpson, Joseph Baillon, Arthur Dowler, Thomas Rees, Keith Arbuthnott and Cameron Nicholson. The instructors in Dempsey's first year included Henry Maitland Wilson and Trafford Leigh-Mallory. Nearly all of these men were to achieve high rank in the upcoming war.

Enjoying his time at the Staff College, Dempsey captained the college cricket team. He also excelled at equitation, beating Gott in the point-to-point competition. Students worked in syndicates; Dempsey's chose to study the August 1914 Battle of Gumbinnen. They toured the battlefield with Hauptmann Anton Reichard von Mauchenheim genannt Bechtolsheim, a German Army officer who had been on two months' secondment to the British Army in 1930. The syndicate noted the influence that poor communications had on the outcome of the battle, and speculated as to how armoured fighting vehicles might have been employed had they existed at the time.

Completion of the course at Camberley was normally followed by a staff posting to allow the graduate to practise his skills, and Dempsey's first posting after Camberley was as a General Staff Officer Grade 3 (GSO3) on the staff of the Military Secretary, Major-General Sidney Clive. Dempsey was responsible for the careers and assignments of all officers below the rank of colonel, with access to their annual confidential reports. Dempsey, who was promoted to major on 22 September 1932, held this post until late January 1934, when he handed over to Horrocks upon receiving an appointment as brigade major of the 5th Infantry Brigade.

The brigade, commanded by Brigadier Victor Fortune (Francis Nosworthy from 1935), formed part of the 2nd Division, then commanded by Major-General Archibald Wavell. It served in Aldershot Command and took part in numerous large-scale military manoeuvres throughout Dempsey's time as brigade major. After handing over again to Horrocks in February 1936, Dempsey returned to the 1st Battalion of his regiment, taking command of HQ Company. The 1st Battalion was now stationed in Shorncliffe, Kent, as part of the 10th Brigade of the 4th Division. Shortly after Dempsey's return, Lieutenant Colonel Eric Miles assumed command.

The following year Dempsey attended a brief course at the Senior Officers' School at Sheerness, before being posted to South Africa, where he served as a General Staff Officer Grade 2 (GSO2) with the Defence Forces of the Union of South Africa at the South African Army College at Roberts Heights near Pretoria, a posting which he enjoyed. Relinquishing that post in late January 1938, he returned to England soon after to succeed Miles as commanding officer of the 1st Battalion, Royal Berkshires, and received a promotion to lieutenant colonel on 11 February 1938.

The 1st Battalion, still with the 10th Brigade, was both lacking in modern equipment and severely understrength, although, with the possibility of another war in Europe, the situation slowly changed and new equipment and reservists began arriving. In October 1938 Dempsey's battalion moved to Blackdown Army Camp in Surrey. It was transferred from Brigadier Evelyn Barker's 10th Brigade to Brigadier Noel Irwin's 6th Brigade and became part of the 2nd Division once more.

== Second World War ==
=== Belgium and France ===
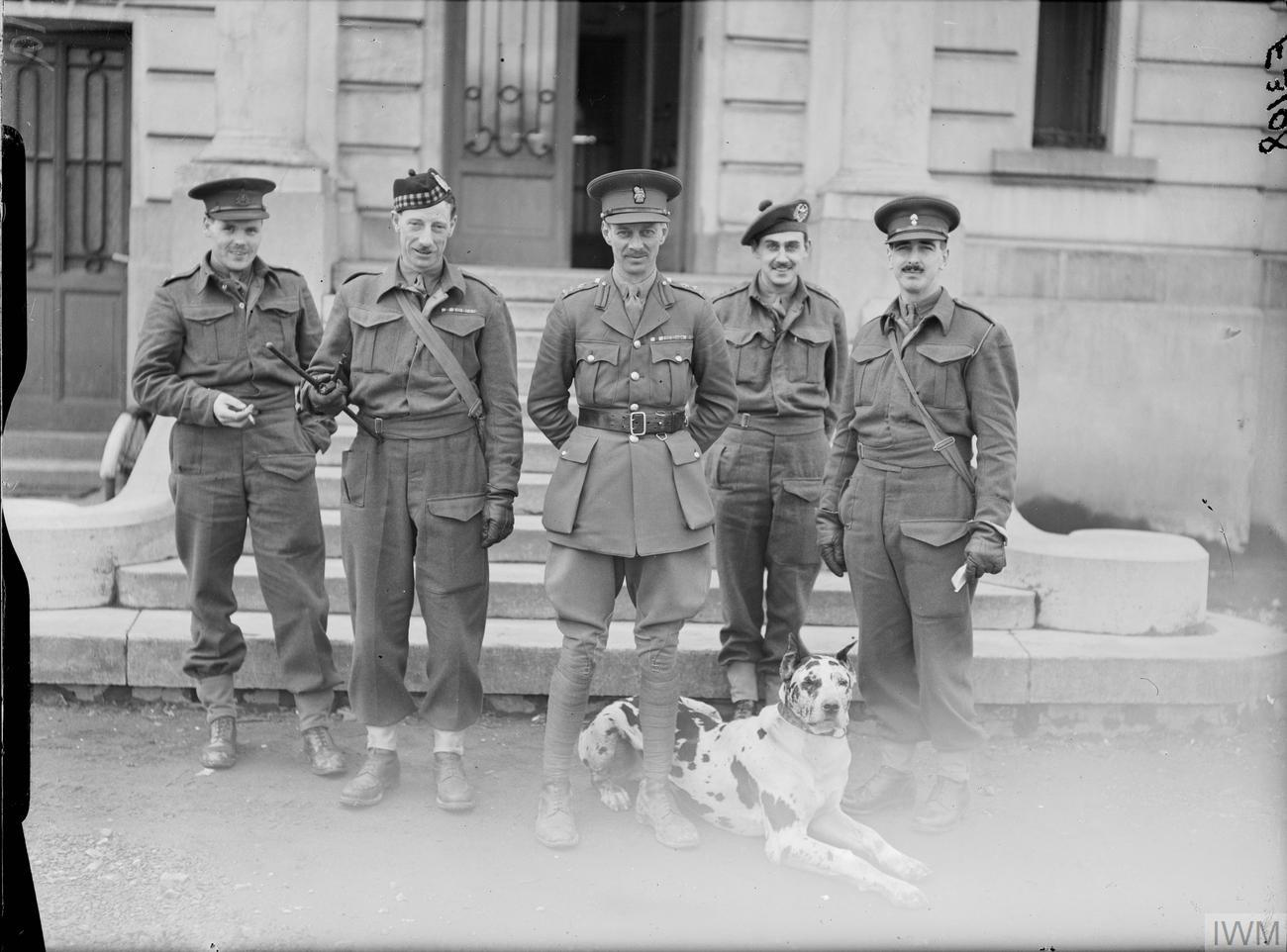
Brigadier Miles Dempsey (centre) and his staff, with their mascot 'Tiny' at Wervicq, France, in late 1939

Soon after the start of the Second World War in September 1939, Dempsey, with his battalion, was sent to France as part of the British Expeditionary Force (BEF). In November, Dempsey was promoted to the acting rank of brigadier, and assumed command of the 13th Infantry Brigade in place of Brigadier Henry Willcox, who had been one of Dempsey's instructors at the Staff College in the 1930s, and had been promoted. Aged just 42, Dempsey was one of the youngest brigadiers in the British Army. The brigade now formed part of Major-General Harold Franklyn's 5th Division, although the division was still not fully formed. The brigade was sent to France as an independent formation, and had spent most of its time on guard duties in the BEF's rear areas. Together with the 15th Infantry Brigade, under Brigadier Horatio Berney-Ficklin, and the 17th Infantry Brigade, under Brigadier Montagu Stopford, it re-joined the 5th Division when the division HQ arrived in late December. The 5th Division then became part of II Corps (Lieutenant-General Alan Brooke).

The brigade saw action in May 1940 in the retreat from the River Dyle and fought in the defensive battle on the River Scarpe. When the Belgian Army surrendered in late May the brigade took part in the holding battle of the Ypres–Comines Canal allowing the 3rd Infantry Division (Major-General Bernard Montgomery) to cross their rear and secure the gap created by the Belgian collapse. In the retreat to Dunkirk the brigade provided part of the rearguard for the BEF during the Dunkirk evacuation before being lifted off the beaches. By the time the 13th Brigade returned to England, it was reduced to fewer than 500 men, out of an original strength of nearly 3,000. For his services in France, Dempsey was mentioned in despatches and made a Companion of the Distinguished Service Order in July, which was presented to him by Franklyn. Soon after, Franklyn was replaced by Berney-Ficklin.

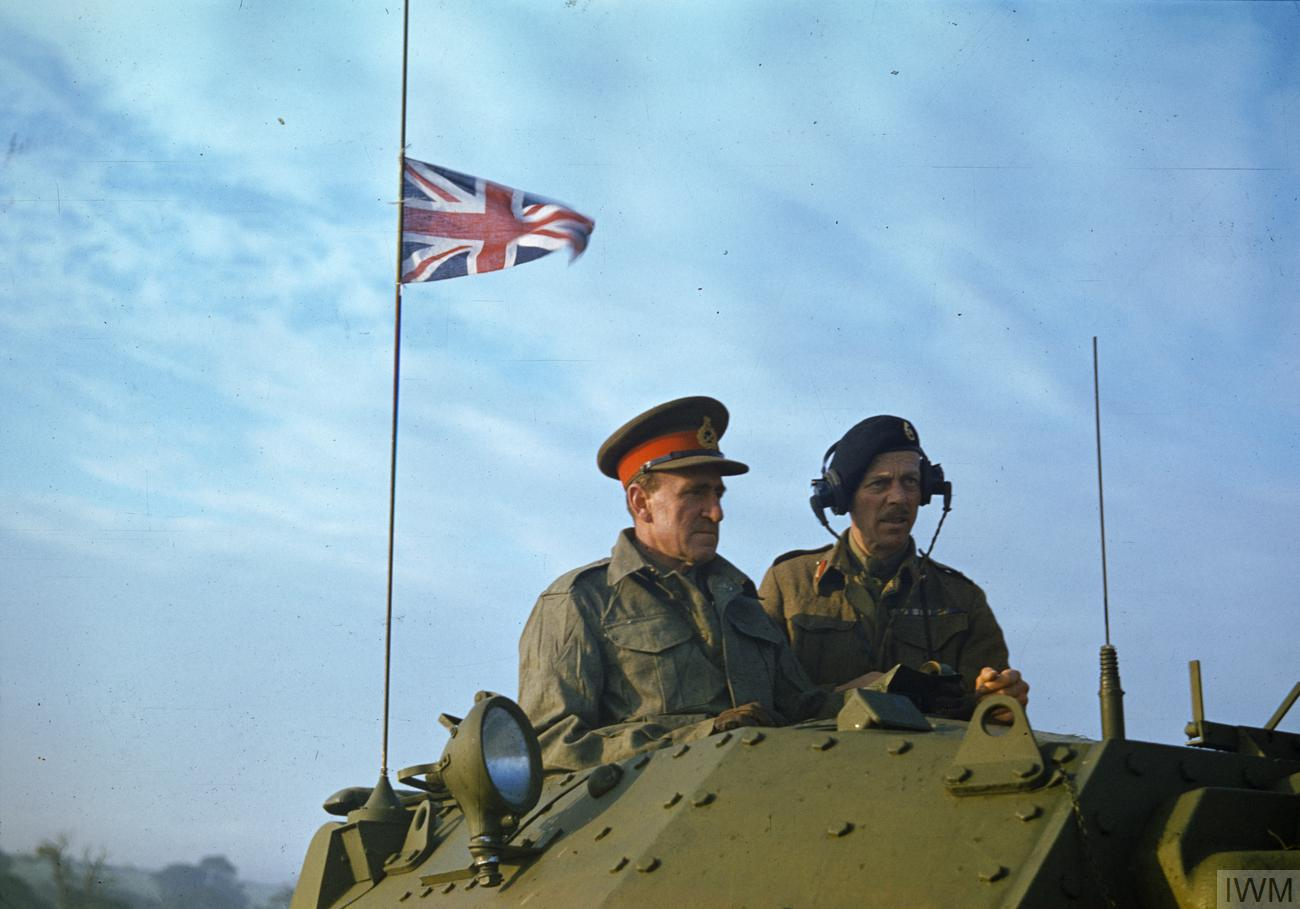
The Commander in Chief Home Forces, General Sir Bernard Paget (left) and Dempsey (right) watch 42nd Armoured Division exercises from a Crusader tank.

In July Dempsey took up the appointment of Brigadier General Staff (BGS) of the newly created VII Corps, which in December became known as the Canadian Corps, and was commanded by Lieutenant General Andrew McNaughton of the Canadian Army. As the senior staff officer of the new corps, he helped to oversee the Canadian units and higher formations during their training, and it was during this time where his "quiet competence, notable friendliness, and lack of airs endeared him to the Canadians." He held this position until 15 June 1941, when he was promoted to the acting rank of major-general, and given command of the 46th Infantry Division, at the instigation of General Sir Alan Brooke, then the Commander-in-Chief, Home Forces, who had recognised Dempsey's ability in Belgium and France and thought highly of him. His stay with the division, which had fought in France a year earlier, was not destined to be for long as, four months later, he assumed command of the 42nd (East Lancashire) Infantry Division, which was in the process of converting to an armoured division. This required him to implement a huge training programme. The 125th and 126th Infantry Brigades were converted into the 10th and 11th Armoured Brigades and their infantry battalions converted to regiments of the Royal Armoured Corps. Further challenges were presented in May 1942 when the establishment of British armoured divisions was altered to have an armoured brigade with an infantry brigade instead of having two armoured brigades. The 10th and 11th Armoured Brigades were withdrawn from the division and replaced by 30th Armoured Brigade and 71st Infantry Brigade. By the end of the year, Dempsey had become well-versed in the direction of combined armoured and infantry formations as well as an experienced trainer of troops.

=== Sicily and Italy ===
On 12 December 1942 Dempsey was promoted to lieutenant-general and assumed command of XIII Corps, part of the Eighth Army in North Africa, at the request of Montgomery, the Eighth Army commander. Dempsey replaced Horrocks, who took over X Corps. In his memoirs, Montgomery wrote that Dempsey had been a student of his when he was an instructor at the Staff College, but his memory was faulty; Montgomery left the Staff College in 1929, and Dempsey did not arrive until 1930.

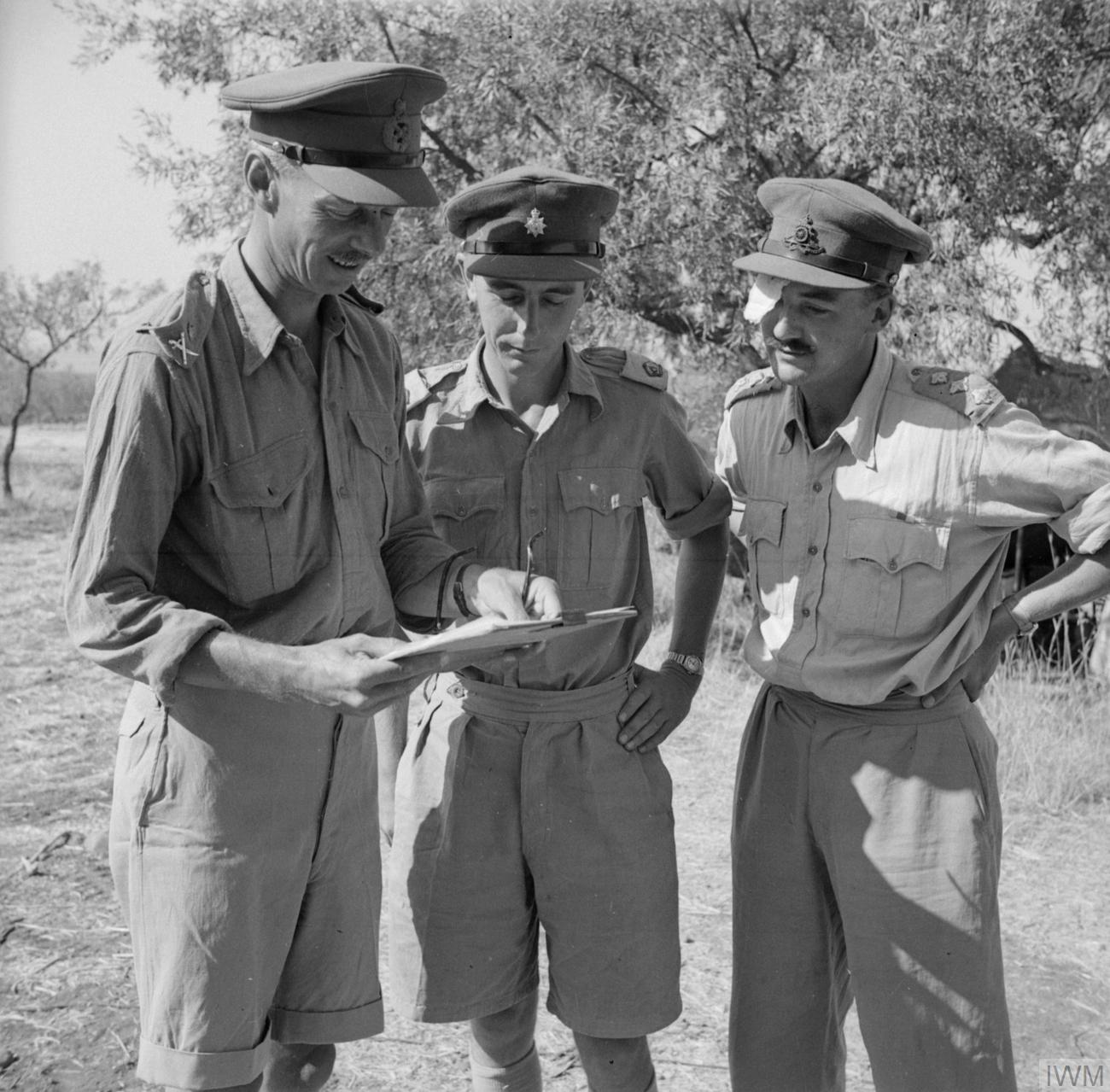
Dempsey (left) with two of his staff (Major Priestly and Captain Hay) in Sicily in July 1943

Unlike a division, which had a set structure, a corps was a flexible formation to which divisions and brigades were assigned as necessary. When he arrived in Cairo, Dempsey found all he commanded was a headquarters, because the long lines of communication to Eighth Army's spearhead could only sustain X Corps and XXX Corps (Lieutenant-General Oliver Leese). Dempsey was employed in the planning of the Allied invasion of Sicily. The plan was developed by a staff in Algiers known as Force 141, under Major-General Charles Gairdner. Dempsey temporarily assumed the role of chief of staff of Force 545, the staff responsible for planning the Eighth Army's part in the operation, until Major-General Freddie de Guingand, the Eighth Army chief of staff, could be spared to take over.

Dempsey did not like the plan, which involved separate, dispersed landings. This assumed that the German and Italian response would be slow and weak, and nothing in the British experience of the war supported the expectation that this would be the case. Dempsey wanted the Allied forces to land where they could support each other in the event of a strong and vigorous German response. Dempsey took his objections to Montgomery on 13 March 1943 and then to Gairdner five days later. The former agreed with him but the latter did not. De Guingand took over on 17 April, enabling Dempsey to return to command of XIII Corps. De Guingand discussed the plan with Dempsey, agreed with Dempsey's objections and prepared an appreciation for Montgomery. Montgomery raised their objections with General Harold Alexander, the 15th Army Group commander, on 24 April. After some debate, the Supreme Allied Commander, General Dwight D. Eisenhower accepted Montgomery's revised plan on 3 May.

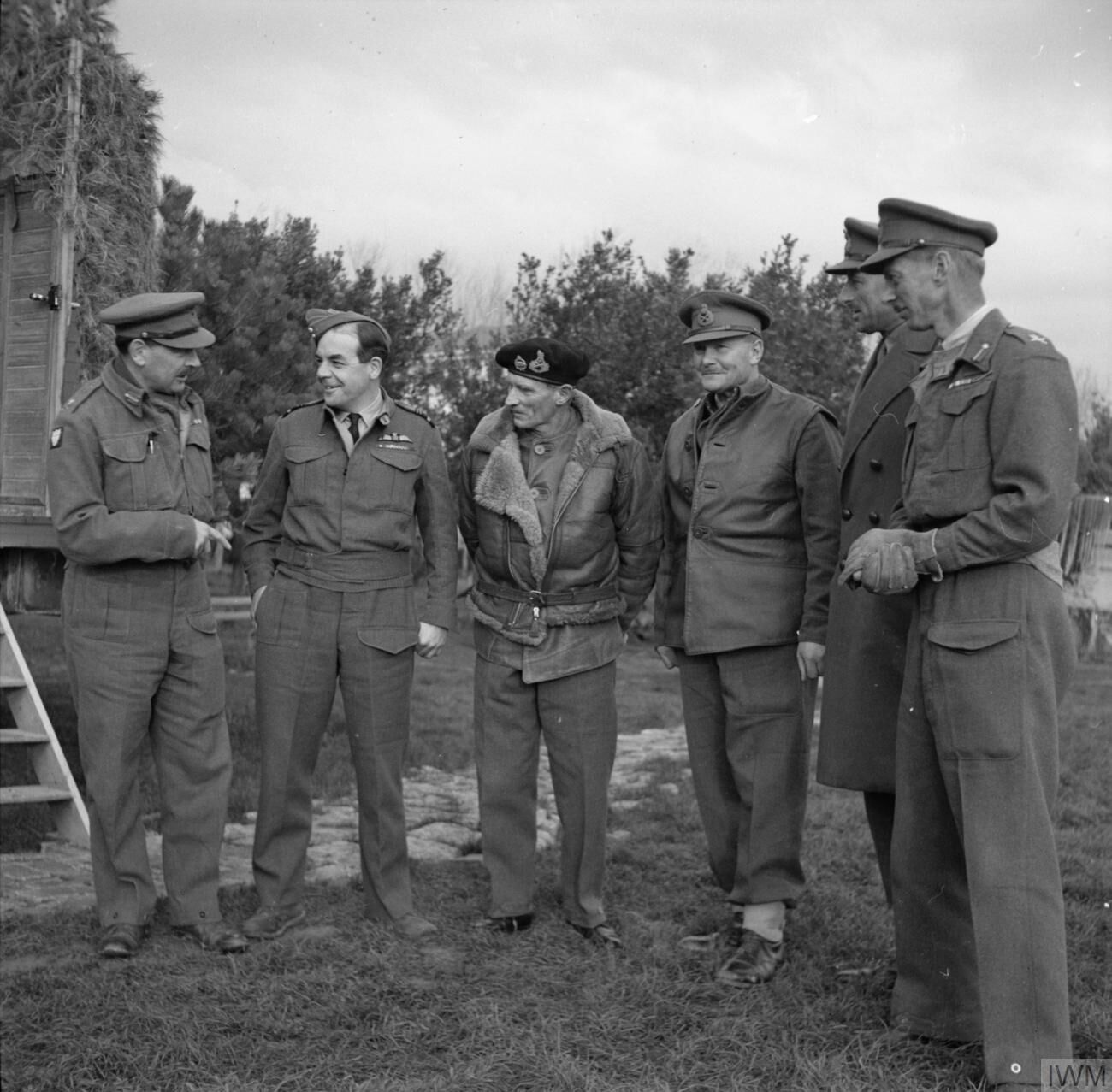
Dempsey (right) in Italy with (left to right) Freddie de Guingand, Harry Broadhurst, Bernard Montgomery, Bernard Freyberg and Charles Allfrey

For the invasion of Sicily, XIII Corps had two infantry divisions, the 5th Division under Berney-Ficklin and the 50th Division under Major-General Sidney Kirkman and the 4th Armoured Brigade (Brigadier John Cecil Currie), which had only two armoured regiments, the 44th Royal Tank Regiment and the 3rd County of London Yeomanry (Sharpshooters). He was also responsible for the 1st Airborne Division (Major-General George Hopkinson), to be dropped by parachute and glider just prior to the amphibious landings.

The landings on Sicily on 10 July initially went well, with XIII Corps achieving all its first-day objectives but by 12 July progress slowed after the 5th Division encountered elements of the German Hermann Göring Division. Montgomery and Dempsey attempted to capture Catania using paratroops and commandos. Operation Fustian was only partially successful and Catania was not taken. Dempsey suggested an amphibious operation but this was rejected by Montgomery in favour of switching the main axis of the Eighth Army's advance inland to the west of Mount Etna. On 3 August Dempsey relieved Berney-Ficklin of his command. His performance had impressed neither Dempsey nor Montgomery and the latter was happy to replace him with another protégé, Major-General Gerard Bucknall.

Air Vice Marshal Harry Broadhurst recalled an incident from the campaign:

"Bimbo" Dempsey, who'd then got XIII Corps, they were completely new ... they'd given a bomb line, asked for air support, close support, they were going to attack somewhere. (Note: Questions about the origin of this nickname always made him blush. He used it in correspondence with close friends and those he considered equals, like O'Connor. According to Peter Caddick-Adams, it was the name of his horse at the staff college.) And the Germans withdrew before we got there. So they advanced without bothering to tell us. And we attacked the place they said. And of course it was Dempsey's own troops. So Dempsey was stinkingly rude. Freddie [de Guingand] rang me up and said: "This is terrible, attacked our troops. I thought we had grown out of that. I said, "Well, I'll go into it." And of course Freddie signalled Montgomery. I went into it and found they'd advanced after they'd asked for air support and then forgotten to cancel it. So I rang Freddie up and said, "It's your lot this time, boy." Monty sent for Dempsey. I was there with him. And he lined Dempsey up and gave him the biggest strip I've ever seen a general get... made him apologise.

On 13 August, towards the end of the campaign, the XIII Corps HQ was withdrawn to reserve to plan Operation Baytown, the Eighth Army's part in the Allied invasion of Italy across the Strait of Messina. The 50th Division was earmarked to return to the UK and was replaced by the 1st Canadian Division (Major-General Guy Simonds), whom Dempsey considered a friend. Although surrender negotiations with the Italians were in progress, intelligence on German and Italian dispositions was sketchy, so the possibility of strong opposition could not be ruled out. Dempsey insisted on an adequate number of landing craft being provided to lift three brigades, along with their supplies, which delayed the operation until 3 September.

Although the XIII Corps landing was unopposed, and subsequent opposition was light, the Germans ensured his progress was slow by destroying bridges and culverts on the only routes through the harsh terrain. It took nearly two weeks to advance more than 300 mi (480 km) to the north to link up with the US Fifth Army landing at Salerno as part of Operation Avalanche. Allied forces then commenced to fight their way northward with the Fifth Army to the west and the Eighth Army to the east of the Apennine Mountains. XIII Corps took part in the Moro River Campaign but the severe winter weather precluded further progress.

=== North Western Europe ===
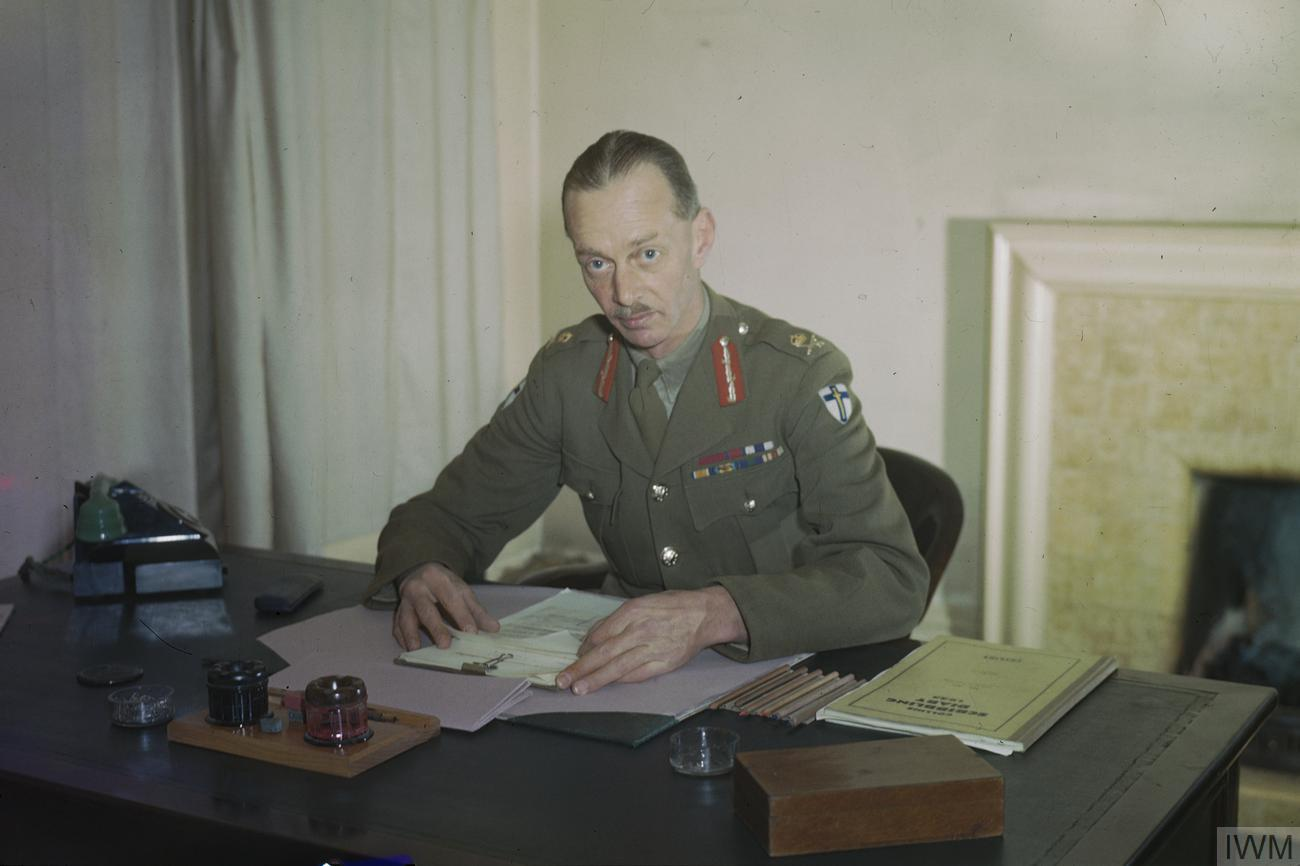
Dempsey at his desk in April 1944

In Sicily and Italy, Dempsey gained a reputation for his expertise in combined operations. Montgomery, left Italy at the end of 1943 to take command of the 21st Army Group for the forthcoming D-Day landings, and he nominated Dempsey to command the Second Army, the main British force involved. Dempsey was not Montgomery's first choice for the assignment; he had recommended that Leese take over the Second Army and Dempsey be given the First Canadian Army. There was no chance that the Canadian government would accept a British officer, and the Chief of the Imperial General Staff (CIGS), Field Marshal Sir Alan Brooke, would not countenance it. Command of the First Canadian Army was given to Canadian Lieutenant-General Harry Crerar. Leese replaced Montgomery in command of the Eighth Army on Alexander's recommendation, and Dempsey was given the Second Army on Montgomery's. Montgomery believed that while Dempsey lacked Leese's ruthlessness and drive, he was cleverer and a better tactician.

Dempsey established his Second Army headquarters at Ashley Gardens in London on 26 January 1944. With his chief of staff, Brigadier Maurice Chilton, who had been part of his syndicate at Camberley, and his naval and air counterparts, Rear Admiral Sir Philip Vian and Broadhurst, Dempsey drew up the detailed plans for the assault on the British and Canadian beaches in Normandy. The Second Army made successful assaults at Gold, Juno and Sword beaches on D-Day, 6 June 1944. Dempsey came ashore that evening and established his tactical headquarters (Tac HQ) at Banville. Like Montgomery, he lived at his Tac HQ, where he maintained a small staff with some aides and liaison officers. It had caravans, radios and some vehicles, and could move at short notice. He had a staff car and an Auster light aircraft, which he called his "whizzer", and used them to move about the battlefield. Main HQ moved to Normandy on 12 June and opened at Creully, where Montgomery had his 21st Army Group HQ. Although usually located further back than Tac HQ, it was still a field headquarters and did not require accommodation in buildings or fixed signal connections. It contained the operations, intelligence and air support branches.

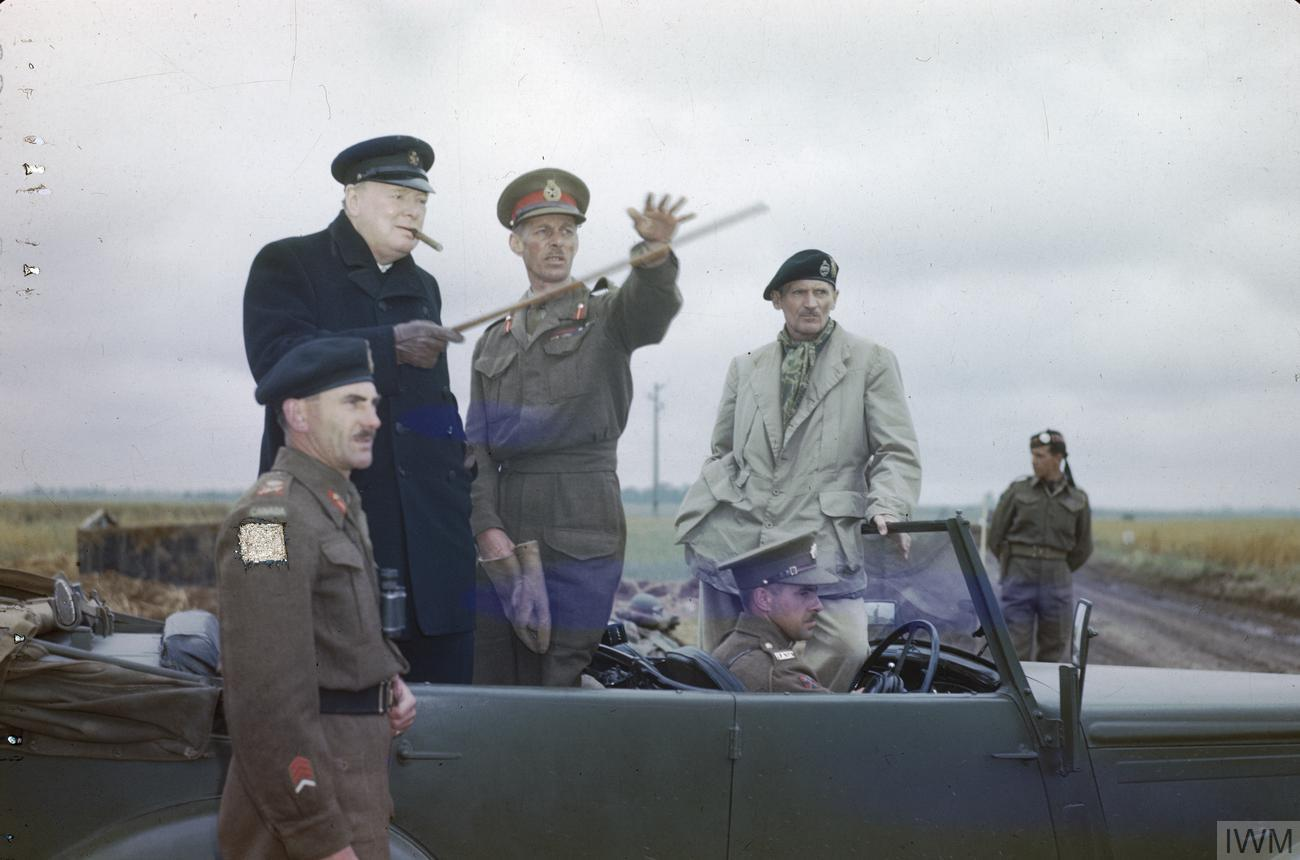
Dempsey points out a section of the front to Winston Churchill, while Guy Simonds (left) and Montgomery (right) look on.

Where possible, Main HQ was co-located with Broadhurst's No. 83 (Composite) Group RAF and A Squadron of the GHQ Liaison Regiment (known as Phantom). Broadhurst was apprehensive when he found out that he would be Dempsey's opposite number, as their relationship in Italy had been strained, something Broadhurst attributed to Dempsey's inexperience as a corps commander. Broadhurst found that Dempsey had accepted that he had been wrong, and worked on forging the Army and RAF into a successful team. Dempsey seldom made a move without talking to Broadhurst, and the two gradually became friends. Main HQ was presided over by Chilton. Chilton and Dempsey would meet every day, usually at Tac HQ. Chilton later became Deputy Adjutant General at 21st Army Group HQ, and he was replaced as chief of staff by Brigadier Harold "Pete" Pyman on 23 January 1945. Rear HQ was normally situated 10 miles (16 km) or so further back and contained the rest of Second Army HQ. It was presided over by the Quartermaster General, Brigadier Geoffrey Hardy-Roberts. In all, Second Army HQ had a strength of 189 officers and 970 other ranks.

The Battle for Caen degenerated into a battle of attrition during which the Anglo-Canadian forces were frustrated by determined German resistance. This fighting drew vital German units including the bulk of their armoured strength to the Caen sector, which facilitated Operation Cobra, the breakout further west by Lieutenant General Omar Bradley's U.S. First Army. Dempsey convinced Montgomery to allow him to make an attempt at a breakthrough using three armoured divisions, assisted by heavy bombers dropping 7,000 long tons (7,100 t) of bombs. This was Operation Goodwood. Launched on 18 July, it resulted in a costly 7-mile (11 km) advance. Goodwood increased the pressure on the German forces and inflicted heavy casualties on them. Montgomery succeeded in his principal aim of drawing away German reserves from Bradley's front, for by 25 July, when Operation Cobra delayed by weather from the 18 July actually commenced, the Germans had 600 tanks, including all the heavy battalions with Tiger I and Tiger II tanks, opposite the Second Army and just 100 facing the U.S. First Army. Dempsey argued after the war that Goodwood had succeeded in many of its strategic aims although there was no breakthrough. There were calls for Montgomery to be sacked, although this was never likely, but little criticism of Dempsey despite him being the architect and directly responsible for some of its tactical flaws.

Dempsey's tactics were based on combat experience in the desert and Italy, but they were not always as applicable or as effective in Normandy. Doctrine called for armour and infantry to be employed in separate brigades, but in Normandy, closer cooperation between the two was required. In the wake of Goodwood, the armoured divisions were reorganised, with infantry battalions and armoured regiments operating together in pairs. O'Connor had urged the adoption of armoured personnel carriers for the infantry, but Dempsey had not agreed to this. Dempsey's use of aerial bombardment and artillery to neutralise the German defences was a sound tactic, but the German forces were disposed in greater depth than had been encountered hitherto and the bombardment did not reach far enough. So too was the use of artillery to suppress the anti-tank defences, but it was less effective against the armoured self-propelled guns that the Germans were now employing. Montgomery took all the heat upon himself, and never tried to shift the blame onto Dempsey.

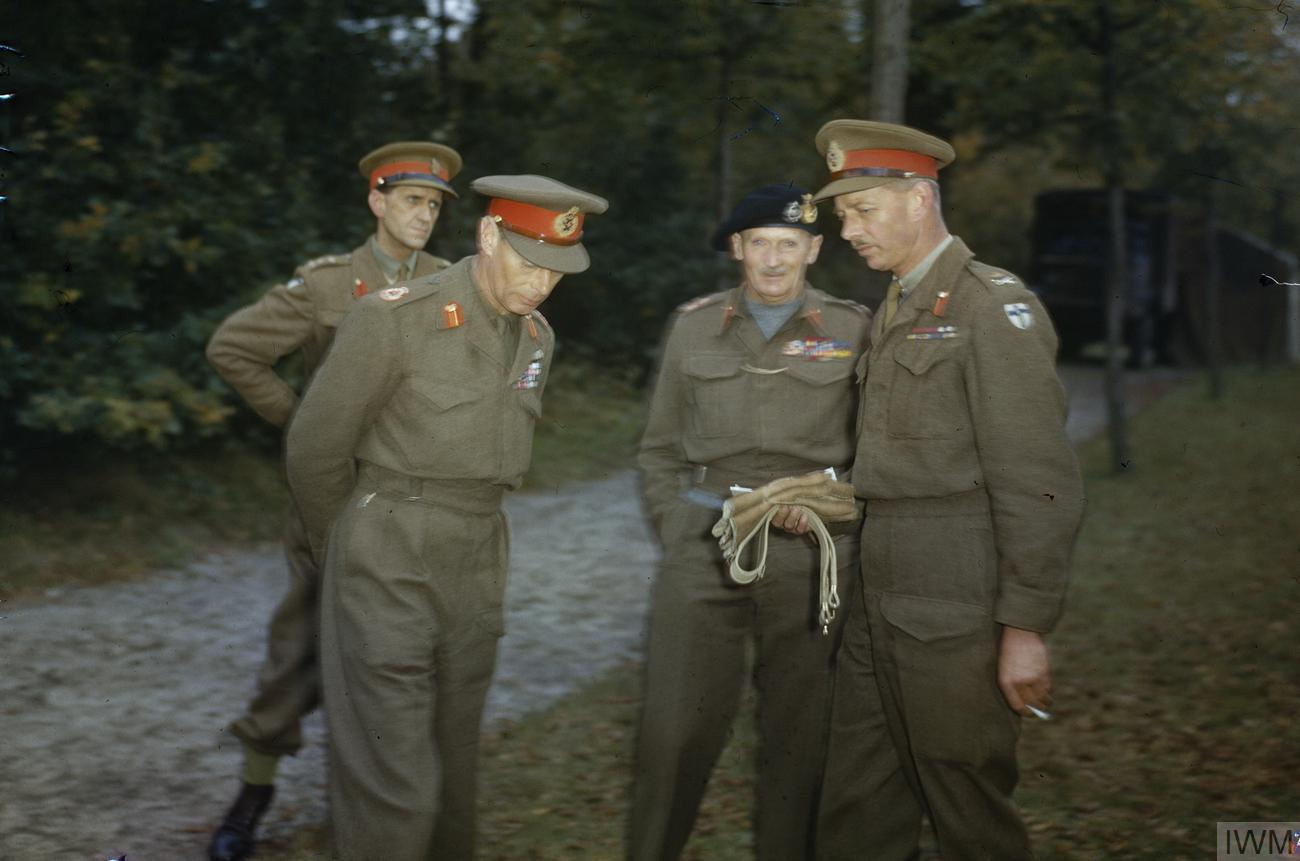
Dempsey (right) with Maurice Chilton (left), King George VI (second from left) and Montgomery

On 2 August, Dempsey told Montgomery that he was fed up with Bucknall, the XXX Corps commander, and Major-General George Erskine, the commander of the 7th Armoured Division, and wanted to relieve them both. Relief of a corps commander is always a sensitive matter, and Bucknall had been appointed at Montgomery's request despite Brooke's reservations. Montgomery now had to admit to Brooke that he had made a mistake and that Bucknall was not fit to command a corps in mobile operations after all. Bucknall was replaced by Horrocks. Erskine was also replaced, in his case by Major-General Gerald Lloyd-Verney. This meant that three of the four British corps commanders in the 21st Army Group had commanded a corps before Dempsey had, but Horrocks (XXX Corps) and John Crocker (I Corps) had been wounded, O'Connor (VIII Corps) had been a prisoner of war; the fourth, Ritchie (XII Corps), had been commander of Eighth Army before being demoted after losing the Battle of Gazala in June 1942.

Horrocks wrote of Dempsey:

He was shrewd, he never flapped, and consequently his second Army HQ was highly efficient and devoted to their Commander. I doubt whether anyone else could have worked so harmoniously and successfully with Montgomery as his immediate boss. The two were complementary: Montgomery the extrovert, who loved the headlines; Dempsey the introvert, who shunned publicity but got on with the job efficiently without any fuss.

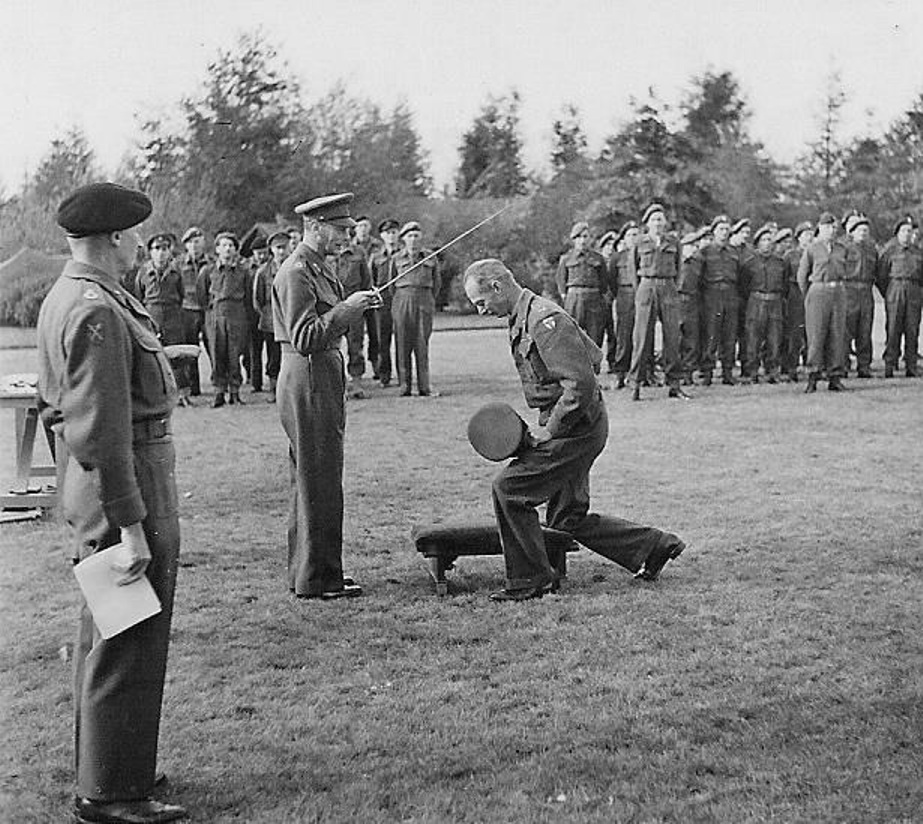
Dempsey is invested with his knighthood in the field by King George VI while Montgomery looks on

The Second Army then made a rapid advance across northern France into Belgium, liberating Brussels on 3 September and Antwerp the following day, Dempsey's Tac HQ moved five times, covering 200 miles (320 km) in eleven days. Second Army took part in Operation Market Garden, the attempt to secure an early crossing of the Rhine. Dempsey believed that it was unlikely to succeed and openly questioned Montgomery. Dempsey suggested an alternative plan of crossing the Maas near Venlo and the Rhine at Wesel, 40 miles (64 km) closer to Bradley's American armies. According to Dempsey, Montgomery's mind was made up by a signal from London concerning the launching of German V-2 rockets against London from sites in the Netherlands. Montgomery's arguments were rooted in military strategy, which was his responsibility, whereas Dempsey's were based in the operational level of war, which was his. And too, Montgomery was difficult to argue with because he always employed well-reasoned military logic, and would not be swayed by anything but the same. Dempsey did convince Montgomery to enlarge the operation so that while Horrocks's XXX Corps would just be the spearhead, it would be accompanied by Ritchie's XII Corps on the left and O'Connor's VIII Corps on the right, and employ three airborne divisions instead of just one.

Market-Garden commenced on 17 September. Airborne troops secured a succession of canal and river crossings to enable XXX Corps to reach the Nederrijn at Arnhem and advance into Germany. Intelligence had not detected the presence of unexpected German formations in the area and resistance proved greater than expected, frustrating XXX Corps' attempts to reach its final objective. During the operation, Dempsey, forward near the front with his Tac HQ, witnessed the assault crossing of the Waal by the U.S. 82nd Airborne Division's 504th Parachute Regiment. He later wrote that the 82nd was "easily the best division on the Western front". Dempsey met with the 82nd's commander, Brigadier General James M. Gavin, shook him by the hand and said "I am proud to meet the commander of the greatest division in the world today." Dempsey also impressed the American paratroopers with his demeanour. When a paratrooper told him that all the leaders of his squad were dead, Dempsey replied: "You're in charge." When it became clear that the operation no longer had any chance of success, Dempsey and Horrocks agreed to terminate it and withdraw the 1st Airborne Division from the north bank of the Nederrijn. On 15 October, during a visit to the Second Army, King George VI invested Dempsey in the field with his award of the Knight Commander of the Order of the Bath, which had been gazetted on 27 June.

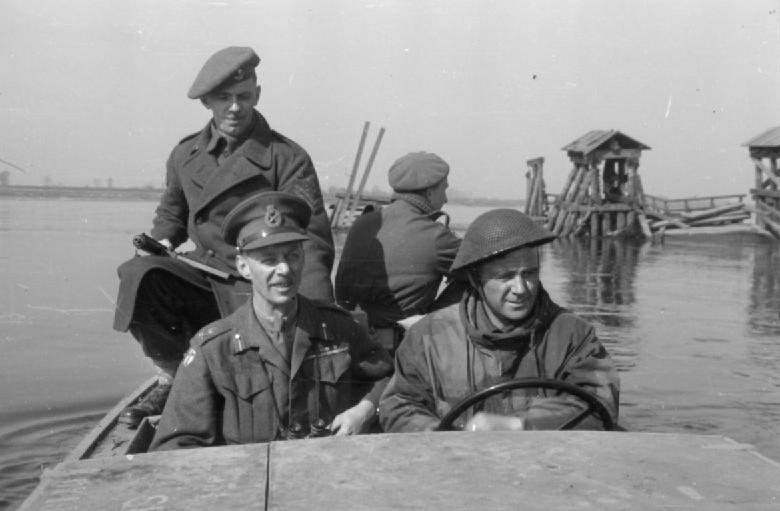
Crossing the Rhine in March 1945

The Second Army, with XII and XXX Corps in the vanguard and Simonds's II Canadian Corps under command, and VIII Corps in reserve, eventually crossed the Rhine on 23 March 1945. Dempsey was the first British commander to do so. The operation was a great success, with one historian writing:

Within a week of the crossing, Dempsey had advanced forty miles with eight infantry, four armoured, and two airborne divisions, plus four independent armoured brigades. Because of meticulous planning and the application of overwhelming air and artillery firepower, the Second Army's 3,174 casualties between 24 and 31 March were relatively light. Airborne losses of 2,888 over the first three days were comparatively heavier, though perhaps not overly so given Plunder's scope. All things considered, Plunder was an exciting victory and one that Dempsey, who had fought all the way from the dark days of Dunkirk, must personally have relished.

On 7 April, The Illustrated London News carried a full front page of a specially commissioned portrait painting of Dempsey by artist Arthur Pan. In May, Dempsey's men captured Bremen and Kiel. On 3 May, a delegation of senior German officers led by Generaladmiral Hans-Georg von Friedeburg arrived at Dempsey's Tac HQ and after questioning it appeared that Friedeburg was a representative of Generalfeldmarschall Wilhelm Keitel, who wished to surrender to Montgomery. Dempsey sent them to Montgomery, which led to the German surrender at Lüneburg Heath the next day. In the meantime, Dempsey negotiated the surrender of the Hamburg garrison with Generalmajor Alwin Wolz.

For his services in north west Europe, Dempsey was mentioned in despatches twice more, and he was made a Knight Commander of the Order of the British Empire in July. The United States awarded him its Army Distinguished Service Medal, and made him a Commander of the Legion of Merit. The Belgian government awarded him its Croix de guerre with Palm and made him a Grand Officer of the Order of Leopold with Palm, and the Netherlands government made him a Knight Grand Officer of the Order of Orange-Nassau with Swords.

=== Far East ===
After the end of World War II in Europe, Dempsey had been nominated to become the commander in chief of British Troops in Austria, but this was abruptly cancelled. On 4 July 1945, Dempsey was summoned to a meeting with Brooke, who informed Dempsey that he was appointed to the command of the Fourteenth Army in the Far East. Brooke was disappointed with Dempsey's attitude, noting in his diary that Dempsey was "suffering from a swollen head, and I took some pains to deflate it!" The appointment had come about because Leese, as Commander-in-Chief, Allied Land Forces South East Asia (ALSEA), had unwisely attempted to side-line Lieutenant-General Sir William Slim, the victorious Fourteenth Army commander, resulting in Leese's removal and replacement by Slim.

Dempsey assumed command of the Fourteenth Army on 10 August. The war ended soon after, and the Fourteenth Army re-occupied British Malaya. Operation Zipper, the planned amphibious landing, was carried out anyway. Dempsey was extremely critical of its poor planning, which he believed would have led to disaster under wartime conditions. Within South East Asia Command there were 122,700 British Commonwealth and Dutch prisoners of war and 733,000 Japanese soldiers. Dempsey was in charge of their repatriation. He also had to deal with the Indonesian War of Independence. The Fourteenth Army ceased to exist on 1 November, and part of its headquarters was used to form that of Malaya Command, with Dempsey in command and his headquarters at Kuala Lumpur. On 8 November he handed over to Lieutenant-General Sir Frank Messervy, and replaced Slim, who returned to the UK, as Commander-in-Chief of ALSEA.

== Post-war career ==
On 19 April 1946, Dempsey was appointed Commander-in-Chief, Middle East. Initially, his main concern was the Greek Civil War. This abated after the end of 1946, allowing British troops to be withdrawn and the commitment handed over to the Americans. The other major concern was the Palestine Emergency. The British Army became involved in a full-scale counterinsurgency. Dempsey advised Montgomery, who was now the CIGS, that if the government was not willing to commit the resources required, then it should contemplate withdrawal from Mandatory Palestine. The experience left Dempsey with a distaste for the role of senior officer in peacetime. He was made acting general in June 1946, which was made permanent on 14 October. He was also appointed to the ceremonial post of aide-de-camp general to the King. Nonetheless, he told Lord Mountbatten that he regarded command of the Second Army as being the pinnacle of his career. Although Montgomery wanted Dempsey to succeed him as CIGS, Dempsey elected to retire instead.

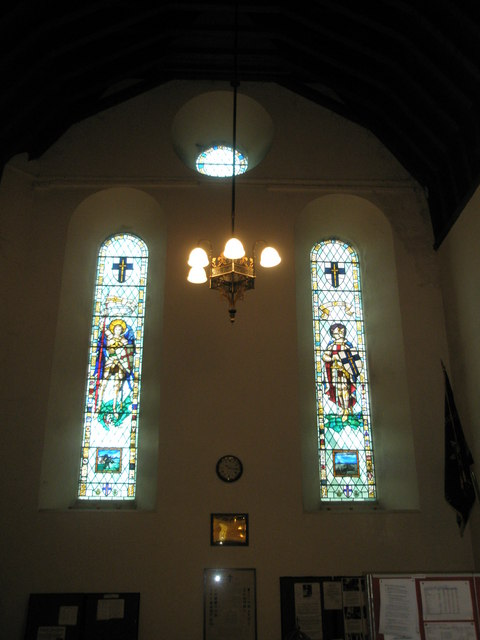
The D-Day windows on the west wall at Christ Church, Portsdown. On Sunday 4 June 1944, Dempsey organised an "Eve of Battle" service here for the troops assembled for the Normandy Landings. In 1948 he returned to dedicate these two windows; and subsequently, returned on the Sunday nearest to this date every year until his death.

Dempsey retired from the Army in August 1947. In 1950, he was appointed Commander-in-Chief, Home Forces. This was a "shadow" appointment, one that would only become active in the event of another major war. He relinquished it in 1956. He was advanced to Knight Grand Cross of the Order of the British Empire in the 1956 New Year Honours. He was Colonel of the Royal Berkshire Regiment from 1946 to 1956, and held the ceremonial posts of Colonel Commandant of the Royal Military Police, from 1947 to 1957, and the Special Air Service (SAS) from 1951 to 1960. He was also Honorary Colonel of the Territorial Army's 21st SAS Regiment (Artists Rifles) from 1948 to 1951. There were proposals to disband the SAS, and to absorb it into other organisations like the Parachute Regiment or the Army Air Corps. Montgomery managed to have the Parachute Regiment made a permanent part of the Army, but it was Dempsey's lobbying that achieved the same status for the SAS in May 1950.

In 1948, Dempsey married Viola O'Reilly, the youngest daughter of Captain Percy O'Reilly of Colamber County Westmeath in Ireland, whom he called "Tuppeny". The two met when Dempsey paid a visit to the stables of the King's racehorse trainer, Cecil Boyd-Rochfort, where she was working. They shared a mutual love of horses. His marriage surprised many of his friends and relatives, as he had been a long-time bachelor, and the bride was Catholic while Dempsey was Church of England. He would sometimes join her for religious services in her own church. They decided to settle in Berkshire, the home of his old regiment, and conveniently close to horse racing venues. They moved to the Old Vicarage at Greenham, and then to Coombe House in Yattendon. He was commissioned as a Deputy Lord Lieutenant in the county of Berkshire in 1950.

Dempsey was Chairman of the Racecourse Betting Control Board from 1947 to 1951, and he bred and raced his own horses. He was chairman of H&G Simonds from 1953 to 1963, and of Greene King and Sons from 1955 to 1967, and the first non-family chairman and Deputy Chairman of Courage, Barclay, Simonds & Co from 1961 to 1966. He declined to write any memoirs about his military experiences, and ordered that his diaries be burned. However, some of his diaries and letters have survived, and are in the National Archives and the Liddell Hart Centre for Military Archives. His engagement diary for the first half of 1944 sold at auction in 2014 for £1,125. He oversaw the July 1947 publication of An Account of the Operations of Second Army in Europe 1944–1945, for which he wrote the foreword and Pyman edited, but only 48 copies were printed; one sold at auction for £8,750 in 2012.

== Death ==
During a visit to his nephew Michael in Kenya, Dempsey felt a pain in his back. When he returned to England it was diagnosed as cancer. He died at his home in Yattendon soon afterwards, on 5 June 1969. "Bimbo died", author and historian Peter Caddick-Adams wrote, "the way he had lived his life, in relative obscurity." He was buried in the churchyard at Yattendon. A memorial service was held at the Farm Street Church, which was attended by Montgomery and Mountbatten.

== Reputation ==
Although modest and unassuming, Dempsey was considered to be a highly competent officer. He asserted effective control over the Second Army without taking the limelight. He was described thus by military historian Carlo D'Este:

A career infantryman, Dempsey was an ardent student of military history and during the interwar period had frequently visited Europe to study its battlefields firsthand [sic]. Blessed with an active and incisive mind, a phenomenal memory and a unique skill in reading maps, Dempsey would soon leave his army staff in awe over his ability to remember everything he saw on a map, to bring a landscape literally to life in his mind even though he had never actually seen it. This talent proved particularly important during the crucial battles around Caen in June and July 1944. Dempsey was considered the Eighth Army's best expert in combined operations and, as he grew in experience, Montgomery soon recognized his potential for army command. The two men shared many qualities, including a disdain for paperwork and a determination, based on their First World War experiences, never to waste their soldiers' lives.

Horrocks wrote that

He has remained a shadowy figure and a general almost completely unknown to the general public. This was primarily due to the fact that he loathed any type of publicity. It was also partly owing to the size of Second Army, which never therefore captured the imagination of the public as the smaller Eighth Army had.

Dempsey is remembered in Singapore by the naming of Dempsey Road and Dempsey Hill, both in the Tanglin area at the former site of Tanglin Barracks. The former British garrison buildings have been converted to civilian use as shops, cafes and restaurants.

== Notes ==
Military offices
Preceded by Douglas Wimberley	GOC 46th Infantry Division; June–October 1941	Succeeded by Harold Freeman-Attwood
Preceded by Eric Miles	GOC 42nd (East Lancashire) Infantry Division; October–November 1941	Post redesignated 42nd Armoured Division
New command	GOC 42nd Armoured Division; 1941–1942	Succeeded by John Aizlewood
Preceded by Brian Horrocks	GOC XIII Corps; 1942–1943	Succeeded by Sidney Kirkman
Preceded by Sir Kenneth Anderson	GOC Second Army; 1944–1945	Post disbanded
Preceded by Sir William Slim	GOC Fourteenth Army; July–November 1945	Post disbanded
New command	GOC Malaya Command; November – December 1945	Succeeded by Sir Frank Messervy
New command	Commander-in-Chief Middle East; 1946–1947	Succeeded by Sir John Crocker
Honorary titles
Preceded by Robert Collins	Colonel of the Royal Berkshire Regiment; 1946–1956	Succeeded by Dudley Hogg
