= Michael Dempsey (disambiguation) =

Michael Dempsey (born 1958) is a British musician who played with The Cure and Associates.

Michael Dempsey may also refer to:

- Michael Ryan Patrick Dempsey (1918–1974), American Catholic bishop
- Mick Dempsey (Gaelic footballer), Gaelic football player
- Mick Dempsey (hurler) (born 1941), Irish retired hurler
- Mike Dempsey (graphic designer), British graphic designer
- Mike Dempsey (intelligence), former acting Director of National Intelligence
- Michael James Dempsey (1912–1996), American-born bishop of the Catholic Church
- Michael Dempsey (table tennis) (1956–2009), American table tennis player
