= James Guidney =

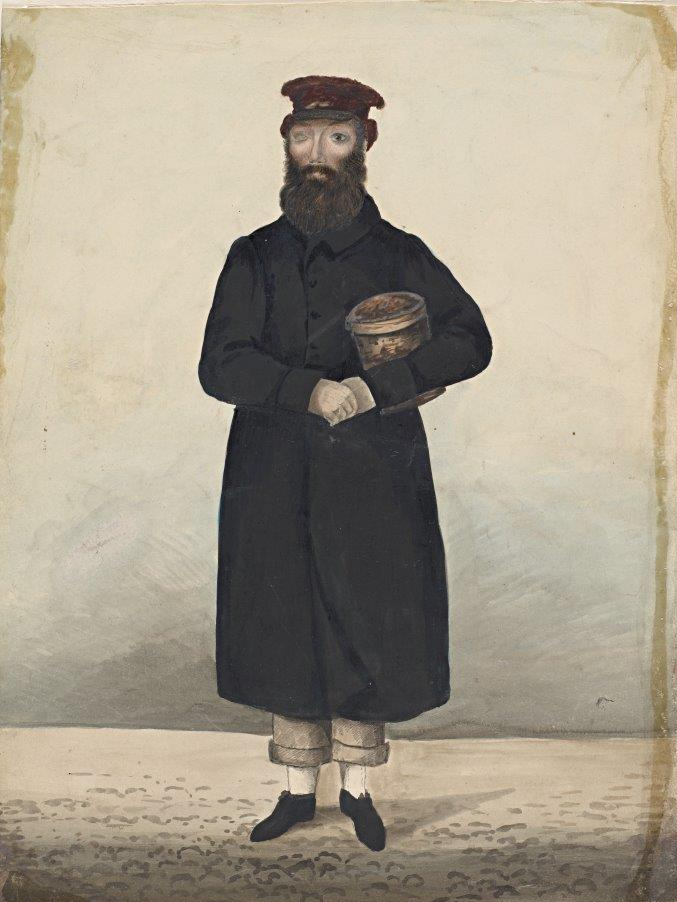
- Watercolour portrait by John Church Dempsey, circa 1830
- Born: 1779 or 1782
- Died: 28 September 1866 (aged 83-87)
- Other name: Jemmy the Rock Man

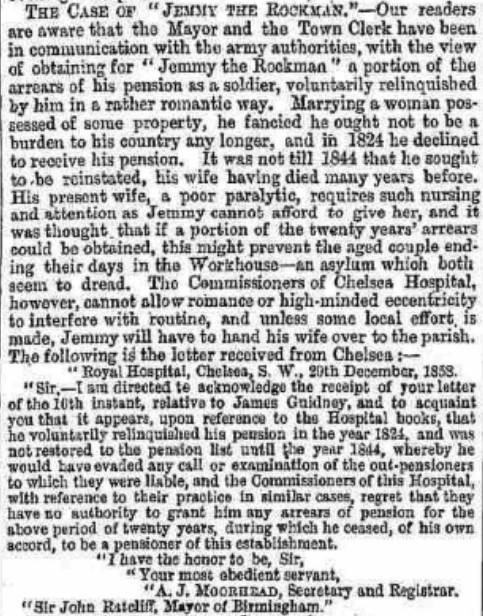
Article about Guidney in the Birmingham Daily Post, 10 January 1859

James Guidney or Jemmy the Rock Man (Note: "rock" is a colloquial name for a boiled sweet or other hard candy in Birmingham dialect) (born 1779 or 1782; died 1866) was a British soldier and later street pedlar in Birmingham, England.

Guidney was born in Norwich in 1779 or 1782. He received five years of part-time education, and worked as an errand boy, before joining the 48th (Northamptonshire) Regiment, initially as a drummer boy, in 1797. He served with them in Gibraltar and then Malta, where he lost his right eye as the result of Ophthalmia. In around 1809 he transferred to the First Royal Veteran Battalion, claiming to have eventually been promoted to "Sergeant and Drum Major to the Battalion".

Several artists painted Guidney; a watercolour portrait by John Church Dempsey is in the Tasmanian Museum and Art Gallery and three in oil (one by William Thomas Roden), and a watercolour, are in Birmingham Museum and Art Gallery, which also holds a silver plated relief, and the tin from which he sold medicated toffee, "good for cough or cold".

His short biography, Some particulars of the life and adventures of James Guidney, a well known character in Birmingham. Written from his own account of himself., was published anonymously in Birmingham and ran to at least four editions, with revisions. It is considered autobiographical, and has many demonstrably-incorrect dates. Among the incidents described are the capture of a purported mermaid, and a lamb that Guidney claimed had assumed human form and instructed him to grow a beard.

Guidney died on 28 September 1866 and is buried in Birmingham's Witton Cemetery.
