= Dzianis Melyantsou =

Dzianis Melyantsou (Belarusian: Дзяніс Мельянцоў, Russian: Денис Мельянцов, occasionally also Denis Melyantsov; born 1980), is a Belarusian political scientist and commentator of foreign relations of Belarus. He is criticised for propaganda in Belarus and lobbyism of the authoritarian regime of Alexander Lukashenko.

== Biography ==
D. Melyantsou was born in Mahilioŭ. He graduated from the Mahilioŭ State University (2003), Vilnius University (2006) and the Belarusian State University.

In 2006-2009 he was a lecturer at the European Humanities University in Vilnius.

Between 2007 and 2017, he was an expert at the Belarusian Institute for Strategic Studies under Vitali Silitski.

Dzianis Melyantsou is the coordinator of the Belarus’s Foreign Policy Programme of the Minsk Dialogue Council on International Relations. He specializes in Belarus’s foreign policy, Belarus-EU and Belarus-US relations, international and European security.

== Criticism ==
Dzianis Melyantsou is the coordinator of the Belarus’s Foreign Policy Programme of the Minsk Dialogue Council on International Relations, a structure close to the Ministry of Foreign Affairs of Belarus.

He is a frequent commentator at the heavily censored Belarusian state media such as Sovetskaya Belorussiya – Belarus' Segodnya or Belarus-1.

In 2012, Melyantsou was accused by journalist and activist Nikolai Khalezin of drafting a letter later signed by a number of Belarusian political analysts and lobbyists that called for the lifting of EU sanctions against members of the nomenklatura of the regime of Alexander Lukashenko responsible for elections rigging, repressions and torture. This was later denied by the director of the Belarusian Institute for Strategic Studies.

Melyantsou criticises the imposition of sanctions against the Lukashenko regime, promoting the involvement of Western countries in a dialogue with official Minsk and to making concessions to the regime, under various guises, including the threat from Russia.

In his statements in Belarusian media, Melyantsou aggressively criticised the opponents of A. Lukashenka.

Together with other participants of the Minsk Dialogue project, Melyantsou was engaged in positioning Lukashenka's Belarus as a supposedly neutral platform for negotiations between Russia and the West.

In his comments to Belarusian media, Melyantsou accused Western countries, which criticise the Lukashenko regime for violating human rights and democratic norms, of being hostile and biased towards Belarus. He accused NATO of aggressive actions against Belarus.

He justified the inaction of Belarusian authorities during the COVID-19 pandemic.

After mass peaceful protests caused by the rigged presidential elections of 2020 and by political terror against opponents of Alexander Lukashenko, Melyantsou made public statements about the allegedly violent nature of the protests, the alleged downscaling of repressions against protesters as a result of the threat of strikes, and emphasised the illegality of a possible strike of workers in accordance with the present legislation in authoritarian Belarus.

He made public claims that the United States supports protests in Belarus basing on geopolitical reasons, expressed regret over the inability of the Lukashenko regime to control the Internet, and justified the brutality of Lukashenko's security forces with police brutality in the United States

== See also ==
- List of people and organizations sanctioned in relation to human rights violations in Belarus
