= Arthur Vickers (VC) =

English soldier and recipient of the Victoria Cross

- Born: 2 February 1882; Birmingham, England
- Died: 27 July 1944 (aged 62); Birmingham
- Burial place: Witton Cemetery,
- Military career
- Allegiance: United Kingdom
- Branch: British Army
- Rank: Sergeant
- Units: The Royal Warwickshire Regiment
- Conflicts: World War I
- Awards: Victoria Cross; Croix de Guerre (France)

Arthur Vickers VC (2 February 1882 – 27 July 1944) was an English soldier and a recipient of the Victoria Cross, the highest and most prestigious award for gallantry in the face of the enemy that can be awarded to British and Commonwealth forces. He was also awarded the French Croix de Guerre.

== Details ==
Vickers was 33 years old, and a private in the 2nd Battalion, The Royal Warwickshire Regiment, British Army during the First World War when the deed took place for which he was awarded the VC. The citation stated:

On 25 September 1915 at Hulloch, France, during an attack by his battalion on the first line German trenches, Private Vickers on his own initiative, went forward in front of his company under very heavy shell, rifle and machine-gun fire and cut the wires which were holding up a great part of his battalion. Although it was broad daylight at the time, he carried out this work standing up and his gallant action contributed largely to the success of the assault.

He received his medal from George V at Buckingham Palace in 1916.

== Further information ==
He later achieved the rank of sergeant, and served in the army until 1935. He died in Birmingham in 1944 and is buried at the city's Witton Cemetery.

== The medal ==
His Victoria Cross is displayed at the Royal Regiment of Fusiliers Museum (Royal Warwickshire), Warwick, England.

== Bibliography ==
- Batchelor, Peter; Matson, Christopher (2011). The Western Front 1915. VCs of the First World War. Stroud, Gloucestershire: The History Press. ISBN 978-0-7524-6057-4.
- Buzzell, Nora, ed. (1997). The Register of the Victoria Cross. Cheltenham, Gloucestershire: This England Alma House. ISBN 0-906324-27-0.
- Harvey, David (2000). Monuments to Courage. Naval & Military Press Ltd. ISBN 1-84342-356-1.
