= Terence O'Dempsey, 1st Viscount Clanmalier =

Irish noble

Terence O'Dempsey, 1st Viscount Clanmalier (Irish: Toirdelbach Ó Díomasaigh; died 1638) was an Irish aristocrat.

He was the son of Dermot O'Dempsey of Queen's County, part of the Dempsey sept. The family were confirmed in their lands as part of the surrender and regrant policy. Terence O'Dempsey served as sheriff of Queen's County, and was knighted by Robert Devereux, 2nd Earl of Essex in 1599. In 1631 he was made a Viscount and Baron in the English peerage by King Charles 1st. (Viscount Clanmaliere and Baron Philipstown)

He was married three times. His first wife was Mary FitzGerald, daughter of Sir Maurice FitzGerald of Laccagh, of a junior branch of the family of the Earl of Kildare and his wife Margaret Butler. His second wife was Genet (or Jenet) Finglas, daughter of Patrick Finglas of Westphailstown, who had previously been married to John Bathe, Attorney General for Ireland, and the distinguished soldier Sir William Warren. His third wife was Margaret Whittie, widow of John Ichingham (died 1616) of Dunbrody, County Wexford; by her first husband she had a daughter Martha, who married Lewis, Terence's grandson and heir. All Terence's children seem to have been from his first marriage. He conformed at least outwardly to the Church of Ireland, although his second wife Genet was a devout Roman Catholic, as were her children by her first husband John Bathe: two of his sons became priests. For this reason, her loyalty to the English Crown was suspect, and she was kept under surveillance.

His eldest son Owny (Anthony) O'Dempsey predeceased him, and he was succeeded by his grandson Lewis O'Dempsey, 2nd Viscount Clanmalier, who was attainted for his role in the Irish Rebellion of 1641 but later had his title and some of his estates restored following the Restoration.

His daughter Eleanor married Peter Sarsfield of Tully Castle in County Kildare, a member of a wealthy Old English family. She was the grandmother of Patrick Sarsfield, the leading Jacobite general during the Williamite War in Ireland.

Another daughter Joan, married Felim O'Neill of the Clandeboye O'Neill family.

O'Demsey's sister Giles was the mother of Roche MacGeoghegan, Bishop of Kildare. Her grandson (through her son Niall) was Conall the Historian.

== Bibliography ==
- Wauchope, Piers. Patrick Sarsfield and the Williamite War. Irish Academic Press, 1992.

Peerage of Ireland
New creation	Viscount Clanmalier; 1631–1638	Succeeded by Lewis O'Dempsey
