= Catholic Campaign for Human Development =

U.S. Catholic anti-poverty program

- Formation: 1969
- Headquarters: Washington, DC
- Director: Ralph McCloud
- Website: https://www.usccb.org/committees/catholic-campaign-human-development

The Catholic Campaign for Human Development (CCHD) is the national anti-poverty and social justice program of the United States Conference of Catholic Bishops (USCCB)

== History ==
CCHD was begun in 1969 as the National Catholic Crusade Against Poverty by the Catholic bishops in the United States, in part as a response to Pope Paul VI's encyclical Populorum progressio ("The Progress of Peoples"). CCHD's mission is "to address the root causes of poverty in America through promotion and support of community-controlled self-help organizations and through transformative social justice, education, and solidarity between poor and non-poor".

The Campaign had its origins in the 1960s with Chicago priest (and later Bishop) Michael Dempsey while serving as pastor of Our Lady of Lourdes Parish on the West Side. He served as the organization's first leader after his appointment as an auxiliary bishop for the Archdiocese. Future cardinal Joseph Bernardin also played a major role in its founding.

CCHD is supported by an annual collection in U.S. Catholic parishes, and individual donations. Allegations that some CCHD-funded organizations were promoting abortion, contraception and radical politics, and that the CCHD was a force of internal corruption within the USCCB were addressed in 2010 with the Review and Renewal of CCHD, which affirmed the core mission of CCHD and instituted controls to ensure that all CCHD-funded initiatives are consistent with Catholic mission and identity.

CCHD had revenues of $18.1 million for the fiscal year ending December 31, 2017.
