= George Ravenhill =

Recipient of the Victoria Cross

George Ravenhill VC
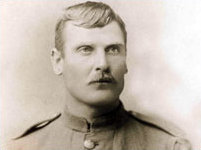
- Born: 21 February 1872; Aston, Birmingham, England
- Died: 14 April 1921 (aged 49); Birmingham
- Burial place: Witton Cemetery, Birmingham
- Military career
- Allegiance: United Kingdom
- Branch: British Army
- Service years: 1889 - 1908, 1914 - 1916
- Rank: Private
- Units: The Royal Scots Fusiliers
- Conflicts: Second Boer War World War I
- Awards: Victoria Cross (forfeited)

George Albert Ravenhill VC (21 February 1872 – 14 April 1921) was an English recipient of the Victoria Cross, the highest award for gallantry in the face of the enemy that can be awarded to British and other Commonwealth forces. Ravenhill is one of eight men whose VCs were involuntarily forfeited.

== Military service ==
Ravenhill was born in Aston, Birmingham in 1872. In May 1889 Ravenhill joined the 1st Battalion of The Royal Scots Fusiliers at Birr, County Offaly. He served near six years in India then two years with the 2nd Battalion in South Africa. He gained the Queen's and the King's medals, with clasps, for Relief of Ladysmith, Transvaal and Cape Colony.

Ravenhill was 27 years old, and a private in the 2nd Battalion, The Royal Scots Fusiliers, British Army during the Second Boer War when the following deed took place on 15 December 1899 at the battle of Colenso, South Africa for which he was awarded the VC. His citation reads:

At Colenso, on the 15th December, 1899, Private Ravenhill went several times, under a heavy fire, from his sheltered position as one of the escort to the guns, to assist the officers and drivers who" were trying to "withdraw the guns of the 14th and 66th Batteries, Royal Field Artillery, when the detachments serving them had all been killed, wounded, or driven from them by infantry fire at close range, and helped to limber up one of the guns that were saved.

He was wounded at Colenso due to being shot through the forearm.

== Forfeiture ==
Ravenhill's VC was forfeited in 1908 after he was imprisoned for theft of a quantity of iron and could not afford to pay the 10 shilling fine. His VC-entitled pension was also withdrawn.

Despite the forfeiture of his VC, Ravenhill re-enlisted into the army in September 1914, aged 42, and fought in the First World War. During the next two years he earned the British, Victory and 1915 Star campaign medals. He was invalided out of the army for health reasons in 1916.

Ravenhill died in poverty at the age of 49, and three of his children were taken away to be fostered in the USA and Canada. Ravenhill is buried in an unmarked grave at Witton Cemetery, Birmingham.

== The Medal ==
Ravenhill's Victoria Cross is currently displayed at the Museum of The Royal Highland Fusiliers in Glasgow, Scotland.

== See also ==
- Victoria Cross forfeitures
- List of Boer War Victoria Cross recipients
