= Judy Dempsey =

Irish journalist and researcher

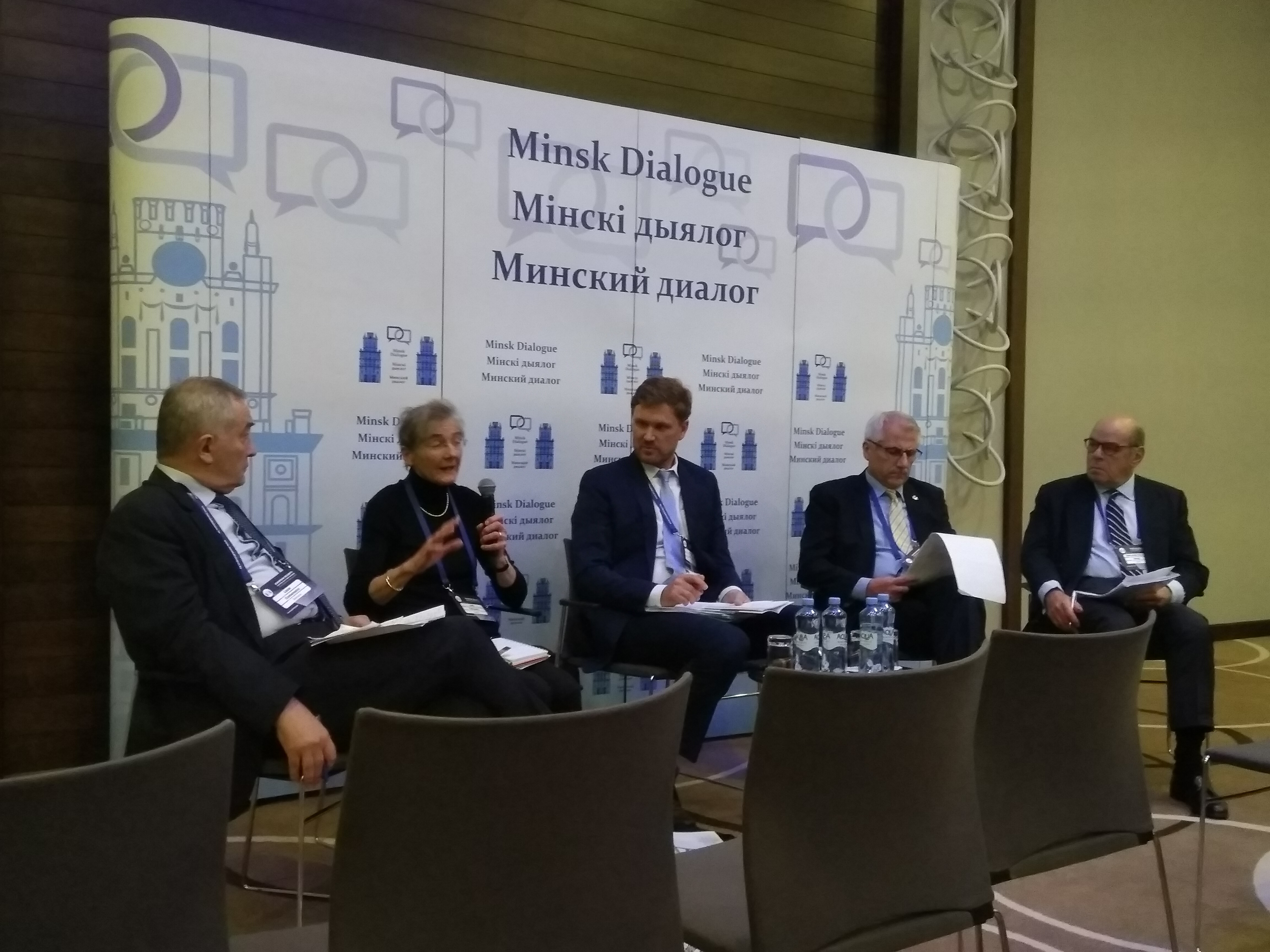
- Dempsey (second from left) speaking at the Minsk Dialogue in 2019, (with left to right: Lazăr Comănescu, Florent Marciacq, Vygaudas Ušackas and Paul Révay
- Born: Ireland
- Education: Trinity College Dublin
- Employer: Carnegie Europe

Judy Dempsey is an Irish journalist and international relations researcher. She is a non-resident Senior Fellow at Carnegie Europe, and has been editor-in-chief for Carnegie Europe's Strategic Europe blog. She has been a guest contributor to the Washington Post, has contributed to The World on PRX and has also written for The Guardian, The International Herald Tribune and The New York Times.

In 2014, she was awarded the Officer's Cross (4th class) of the Order of Merit of the Republic of Poland for "outstanding services in supporting democratic changes in Poland, for promoting Poland to the world".
