= Viscount Clanmalier =

Title in the Peerage of Ireland

Viscount Clanmalier, in the King's and Queen's County, was a title in the Peerage of Ireland. It was created on 22 December 1631 for Sir Terence O'Dempsey, Sheriff of Queen's County in 1591 who was knighted in 1599. He was made Baron of Phillipstown, in the Queen's County, at the same time, also in the Peerage of Ireland. His grandson, Lewis, the second Viscount, joined the Irish Rebellion of 1641 and was consequently attainted with his titles forfeited. However, in 1662 he was restored to a third of his former estates and presumably to his titles. His son, Maximilian, the third Viscount, was Governor of King's County.

== Viscounts Clanmalier (1631) ==
- Terence O'Dempsey, 1st Viscount Clanmalier (died c. 1638)
  - Hon. Owny O'Dempsey (died between 1637 and 1638)
- Lewis O'Dempsey, 2nd Viscount Clanmalier (died 1683)
- Maximilian O'Dempsey, 3rd Viscount Clanmalier (died 1691)
