= Jack Dempsey (disambiguation) =

Jack Dempsey (1895–1983) was a heavyweight boxing champion.

Jack Dempsey may also refer to:

== Sports ==
- Jack Dempsey (wrestler) (1920–2007), British wrestler
- Jack "Nonpareil" Dempsey (1862–1896), Irish-born middleweight boxing champion
- Jack Dempsey (Australian footballer) (1919–2006), Australian rules footballer
- Jack Dempsey (American football) (1913–1988), American football tackle
- Jack Dempsey (rugby union) (born 1994), Australian-Scottish rugby player
- Jack Dempsey (Gaelic footballer) (1878–1913), Irish Gaelic footballer
- Jack Dempsey (rugby league) (1907–1951), Australian rugby league player

== Other uses ==
- Jack Frost (musician) (born 1968), American guitarist, born Jack Dempsey
- Ken Goldstein (born 1969), a.k.a. Jack Dempsey, American filmmaker, occasional actor and musician
- Jack Dempsey (politician) (born 1966), Australian politician
- Jack Dempsey (fish), a species of cichlid

== See also ==
- Jack Dempsey's Broadway Restaurant, New York City restaurant
- John Dempsey (disambiguation)
