= Witton Cemetery =

Cemetery in Birmingham, England

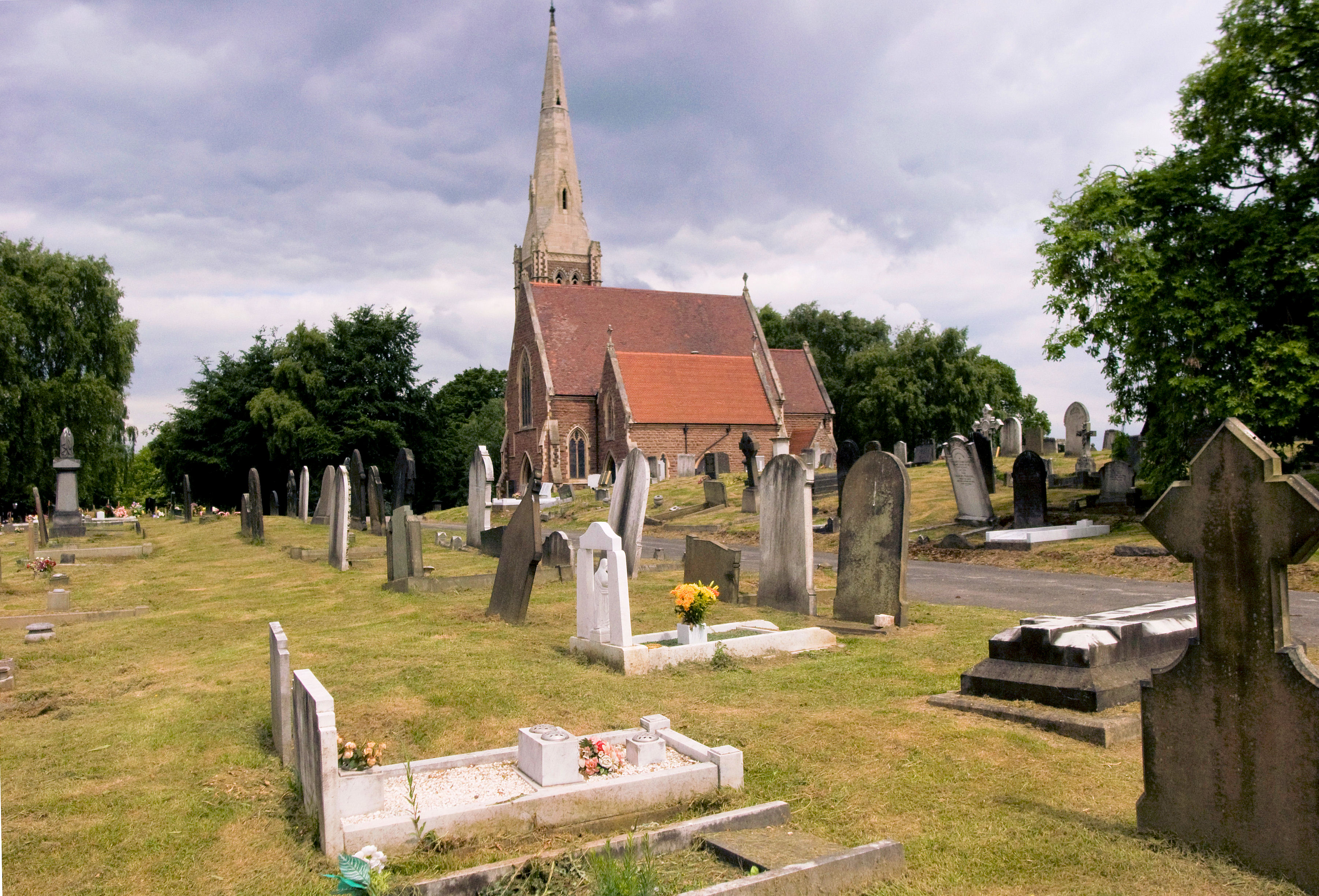
- Chapel near the highest point
- Interactive map of Witton Cemetery

Details
- Established: 1863
- Location: Birmingham
- Country: England
- Coordinates: 52.5249°N 1.8787°W
- Owned by: Birmingham City Council
- Website: www.birmingham.gov.uk/witton-cemetery
- Find a Grave: Witton Cemetery

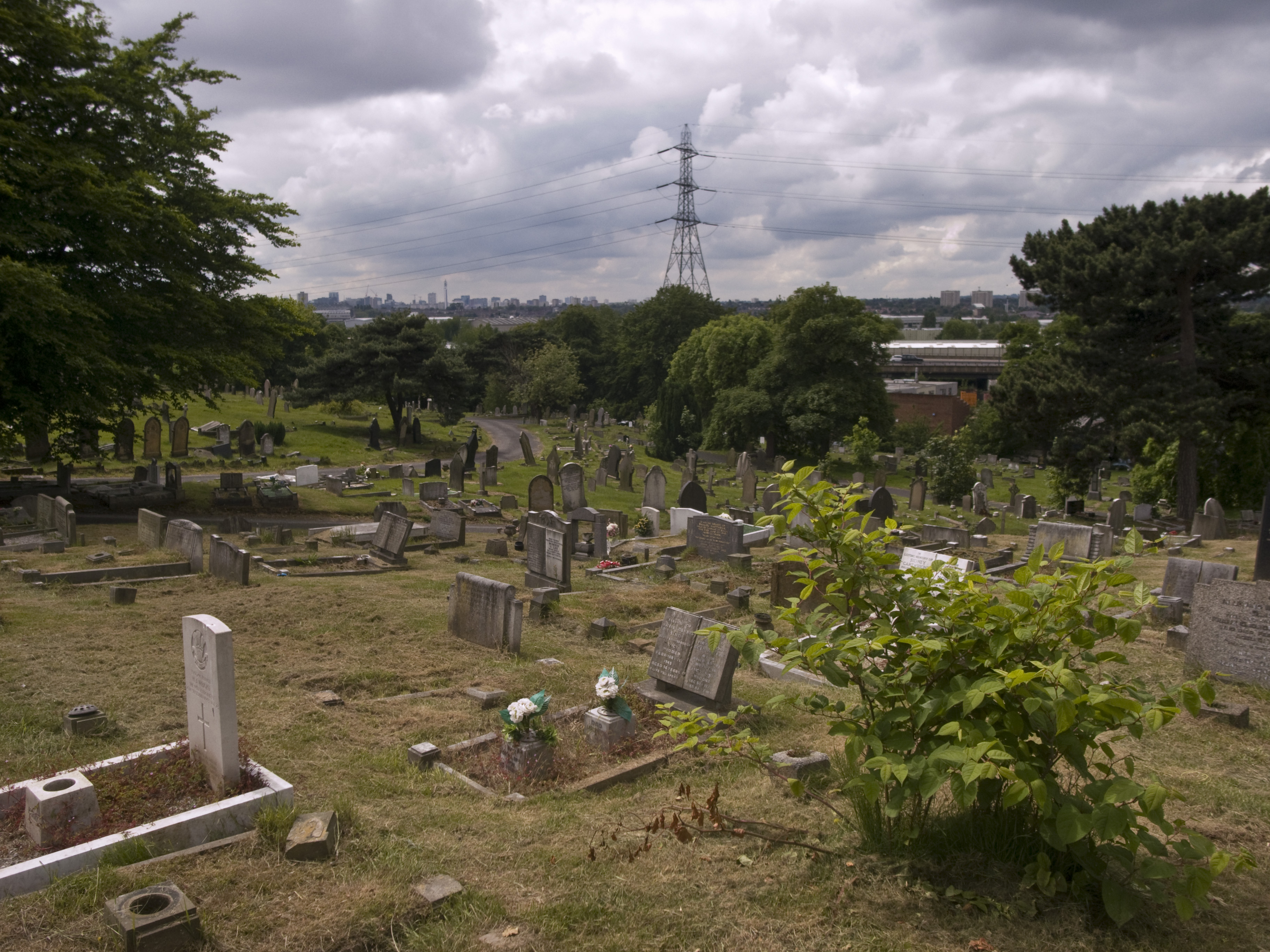
View of central Birmingham from the highest point of the cemetery. In the left foreground is a CWGC headstone marking one of the cemetery's 683 Commonwealth war graves.

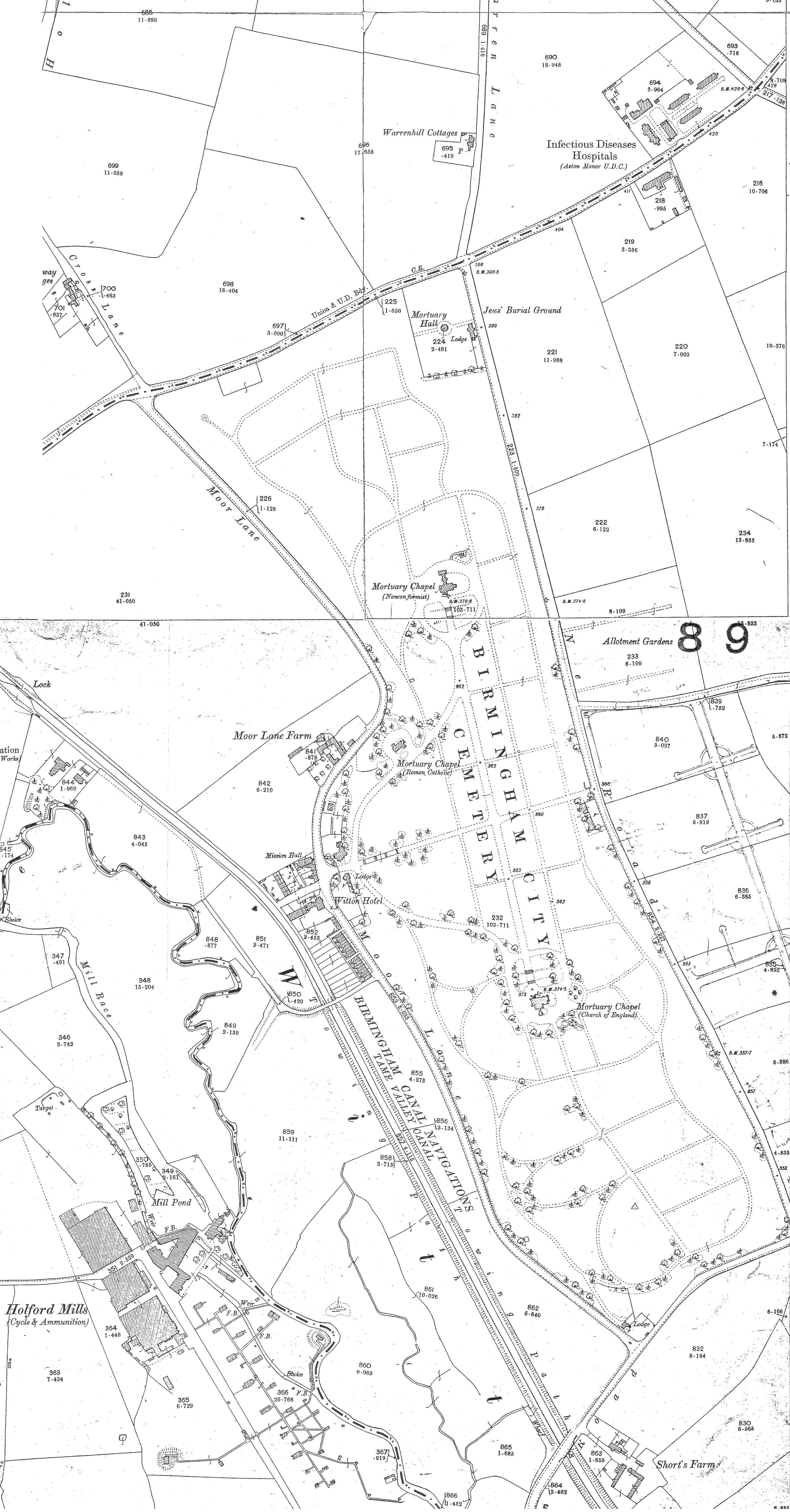
1903 Ordnance Survey map

Witton Cemetery (grid reference SP082921), which opened in Witton in 1863 as Birmingham City Cemetery, is the largest cemetery in Birmingham, England. Covering an area of 103 acres (0.42 km^{2}), it once had three chapels; however, two of these were demolished in 1980. The cemetery would perform up to 20 burials a day; however, it was declared "full to capacity" in December 2013, allowing burials only in existing family plots, or of babies or cremated remains. Extra capacity was therefore provided at the nearby New Hall Cemetery. The cemetery office was opened in 1999.

== History ==
Started in May 1860 and consecrated by the Bishop of Worcester on 23 May 1863, it was the only cemetery owned by the Corporation of Birmingham until 1911, when an expansion of the city boundary brought in others. Key Hill and Warstone Lane Cemetery were private concerns. It opened in 1863 with an area of 106 acres (0.43 km^{2}). In 1869, 2 acres (8,100 m^{2}) were bought by the Jewish community for their interments, forming Birmingham Hebrew Congregation Cemetery, at the north of the site, across College Road. In 1882 an obelisk was constructed to replace the monuments that were previously at The Old Meeting House chapel, which itself was demolished to make way for New Street railway station.

== War graves ==
The cemetery contains 459 Commonwealth service war graves from World War I, over 200 of whom form three denominational war graves plots marked by screen walls bearing names of those buried within the plots and elsewhere in the cemetery whose graves could not be marked by headstones.

There are 224 Commonwealth war graves from World War II, the highest concentration (31 burials) in a small war graves plot in Sections 55 and 56, and the rest are scattered individually in the rest of the cemetery. The names of 12 service personnel of that war whose graves could not be marked by CWGC headstones were added to the screen wall at the World War I plots.

== Notable burials ==
- Private George Ravenhill (1872–1921), VC recipient Boer War. Grave currently (2012) unmarked.
- William Snook, athlete (1861–1916). Died in workhouse hospital, his funeral paid for by former running club Birchfield Harriers.
- Sergeant Arthur Vickers (1882–1944), VC recipient First World War.
- John Cadbury (1801–1889) was the proprietor of a small chocolate business in Birmingham, England, that later became Cadbury plc.
- James Guidney (1782–1866), former soldier and pedlar
