= James Dempsey =

James Dempsey may refer to:

- James Dempsey (Scottish politician) (1917–1982)
- James Shannon Dempsey (1887–1955), Canadian politician in the Legislative Assembly of Ontario
- James Dempsey (poker player), English professional gambler
- James Dempsey (builder) (1768–1838), Australian pioneer
- James Dempsey (hurler) (born 1989), Irish hurler
- James C. Dempsey, United States Navy submarine commander
