= Amy Dempsey =

American art historian

- Born: 22 December 1963 (age 62)
- Education: Courtauld Institute of Art
- Occupation: Author
- Scientific career
- Thesis: The friendship of America and France: A new internationalism, 1961–1965

Amy Jo Dempsey FRSA (born 1963) is an independent scholar and art historian based in London. Her book Styles, Schools and Movements (2002) has seen twenty-eight editions, including a revised and expanded edition in 2010, and is available in fifteen languages.

== Early life ==
Amy Dempsey was born in Minneapolis, MN on 22 December 1963. She lived in 17 different places in the United States before the age of 10. She studied at the University of Virginia in Charlottesville, VA and at Hunter College in New York under Rosalind Krauss before receiving her PhD from the Courtauld Institute of Art in London on the subject of The Friendship of America and France: A New Internationalism, 1961–1965. Dempsey's early career in the arts included working at commercial galleries in Washington D.C and New York and writing for various museums in London when she moved there in the 1990s, including Tate, Victoria & Albert and National Maritime Museum.

== Writing ==
Dempsey's first art history book was Styles, Schools & Movements: The Essential Encyclopaedic Guide to Modern Art, published by Thames & Hudson in 2002, which was translated into fourteen languages other than English. A second expanded edition was published in 2010. A new, updated, expanded version will be published in 2027.

In 2006 she published the first book on ‘Destination Art’, coining the phrase to provide a framework with which to present, discuss and promote artworks in which location is an integral ingredient, as is the journey to find them. Destination Art (2006) saw eight editions, including a revised and expanded edition in 2011, and was available in five languages.

Dempsey is also the author of three titles in Thames & Hudson's Art Essential series: Modern Art (2018, sixteen editions, fourteen languages), Surrealism (2019, thirteen editions, eleven languages) and Destination Art (2021, five editions, three languages).

In 2026 Dempsey's book The Female Body in Art was published by Laurence King and translated into German, Spanish and Japanese.

She is a fellow of the Royal Society of Arts.

== Selected publications ==
- Styles, Schools and Movements: The Essential Encyclopaedic Guide to Modern Art. Thames & Hudson, London, 2002. (2nd edition 2010) ISBN 9780500237885, ISBN 9780500288443
- Art in the Modern era: A Guide to Styles, Schools, & Movements. Abrams, New York, 2002. (U.S. edition of Styles, Schools and Movements) ISBN 9780810941724
- Destination Art. Thames & Hudson, London, 2006. (2nd edition, 2011) ISBN 9780500238325, ISBN 9780500288801
- Museu Berardo: An itinerary. Thames & Hudson, London, 2007. (co-author) ISBN 9780500287002
- Modern Art (Art Essentials). Thames & Hudson, London, 2018. ISBN 9780500293225
- Surrealism (Art Essentials). Thames & Hudson, London, 2019. ISBN 9780500294345
- Destination Art (Art Essentials). Thames & Hudson, London, 2021. ISBN 9780500295601
- The Female Body in Art. Laurence King, London, 2026. ISBN 9781399626736
