= John Dempsey (footballer, born 1951) =

English footballer

Personal information
- Full name: John Dempsey
- Date of birth: 2 April 1951 (age 75)
- Place of birth: Birkenhead, England
- Position: Full back

Senior career*
Years	Team	Apps	(Gls)
1967–1972	Tranmere Rovers	53	(1)
- * Club domestic league appearances and goals

John Dempsey (born 2 April 1951) is an English footballer, who played as a full back in the Football League for Tranmere Rovers.
