= Michael Ryan Patrick Dempsey =

American Roman Catholic bishop

His Excellency, The Most Reverend Michael Dempsey
- Auxiliary Bishop of Chicago
- Church: Catholic Church
- See: Titular See of Truentum
- In office: June 13, 1968 - January 8, 1974
- Other posts: President, National Catholic Crusade Against Poverty

Orders
- Ordination: May 1, 1943 by Samuel Stritch
- Consecration: June 13, 1968 by John Cody

Personal details
- Born: September 10, 1918 Chicago, Illinois, USA
- Died: January 8, 1974 (aged 55) Chicago
- Motto: Deus meus adjutor meus (My God is my helper)

Michael Ryan Patrick Dempsey (September 10, 1918 – January 8, 1974) was an American Catholic prelate who served as an auxiliary bishop of the Archdiocese of Chicago in Illinois from 1968 to 1974.

== Biography ==
=== Early life and ordination ===
Michael Dempsey was born in Chicago, Illinois on September 10, 1918. He was ordained a priest for the Archdiocese of Chicago on May 1, 1943, by Archbishop Samuel Stritch Dempsey would spend 30 years serving parishes in the poor neighborhoods of Chicago. During the 1960s, Dempsey was serving as pastor of Our Lady of Lourdes Parish.

=== Auxiliary Bishop of Chicago ===
On June 13, 1968 Pope Paul VI appointed Dempsey as the titular bishop of Truentum and as an auxiliary bishop of Chicago. He was consecrated by Cardinal John Cody on June 13, 1968 in Sacred Heart Chapel at the Quigley Preparatory Seminary South in Chicago. The principal co-consecrators were Bishops Ernest John Primeau and Cletus F. O'Donnell.

Dempsey was a founder and the first president in 1969 of the National Catholic Crusade Against Poverty, a group dedicated to promoting self-help among the poor and a willingness to fight for social justice. One of Dempsey's favorite sayings was "Poverty just doesn’t have to be, and the Lord gave us the vision to overcome it in our time.” In 1970, Dempsey announced a $50 million fundraising drive for the organization.

=== Death ===
Dempsey died in Chicago from a heart attack on January 8, 1974. The National Catholic Crusade continues as of 2025 as the Catholic Campaign for Human Development, run by the US Conference of Catholic Bishops.
