= Rosemary Dempsey =

Rosemary Jacqueline Dempsey

Rosemary Dempsey is an American activist who has served many roles in second wave feminism, civil rights movements, and anti-war protests. Her most notable positions were Vice President for Action of the National Organization for Women starting in 1990 and Director for the Center for Reproductive Law and Policy.

== Education and early activism ==
Dempsey earned her B.A in sociology from the College of New Rochelle in 1967, which was a private, all women's Catholic college. It is known as the first Catholic women's college in New York State when it was founded in 1904. In the Fall of 2016, the College of New Rochelle admitted men for the first time. Later she earned her Juris Doctor from Rutgers University Law School. As a young student, she began her activist career speaking out during the civil rights movement in the 1960s and participating in anti-war protests.

== Career highlights ==
- Founded "New Jersey Women Take Back the Night," with the goal to generate public awareness and lobby legislators for the fight against violence against women
- Chartered the New Jersey Chapter of NOW as President
- Formed a battered women's shelter in New Jersey called Womanspace
- Chaired a statewide coalition to pass lesbian and gay rights legislation in New Jersey
- Served National Board member of the LAMBDA Legal Defense and Education Fund
- Founded feminist law firm McGahen, Dempsey and Case
- Served as a trustee on the New Jersey Bar Association for four years for the women's rights section
- Served as DC Director for the Center for Reproductive Law and Policy

== Professional life ==
Dempsey studied law and worked in the criminal justice system. She practiced law for 12 years in New Jersey, where she founded the feminist law firm McGahen, Dempsey and Case. She became interested in the women's movement in the 1960s because it affected her and every other woman. She came across NOW in 1970 and has played an active role in the organization since. She played a vital role in the chartering of the New Jersey Chapter of NOW in 1973 where she served as their first president. She says, "[NOW] came along at a time in my life when I had little children, and I needed to connect with some meaningful movement."

=== Work with NOW ===
NOW was founded in June 1966. It started as 28 women who attended the Third National Conference of Commissions on the Status of Women in DC. Today, NOW is the largest women's rights organization in the U.S. NOW has worked toward women's equality and dignity. To do so, they have gone up against issues such as discrimination in education, credit, and employment. NOW also works to help the reputation of women who choose to stay at home, and have helped to elevate their voices. NOW has also fought for the rights of women in marriage and divorce.

Dempsey was vice president of the organization during a tumultuous time for women's rights, and was at the forefront of many key feminists movements.

During her time with NOW, she travelled around the country on a speaking tour to talk about feminist issues. Some colleges on this tour included Penn State, Franklin and Marshall College, the University of Pennsylvania, Haverford College, and Carnegie Mellon University. A main topic during this tour was the wage gap for women. At this time women were making 58% of what men made, so it was at the forefront of NOW's work.

Dempsey was also Vice President of NOW when Justice Clarence Thomas was nominated as a Supreme Court Justice. She was quoted saying that Thomas' hearing was a "collective click" for women all over the nation.

Dempsey helped plan the "We Won't Go Back!" March for Women's Lives in Washington DC that took place on April 5, 1992. This march was sponsored by NOW, and advocated for abortion rights in America. This walk had over half a million attendees, and was organized to impress lawmakers and the public during a time when the Supreme Court was hearing a case that had the ability to severely limit women's rights. The New York Times wrote an article that day outlining the dangers of the Supreme Court Case.

On April 22, the High Court will hear arguments on a Pennsylvania law that seeks to limit access to abortion through a variety of regulations, including a 24-hour waiting period and a requirement that women seeking abortions notify their husbands. Many people on both sides see that case as a potential vehicle for overturning Roe v. Wade. Meanwhile, some states have adopted even stricter limits.

The Supreme Court case Planned Parenthood of Southeastern Pennsylvania v. Robert P. Casey was a landmark case that reaffirmed Roe v. Wade to secure abortion rights to women. This case sparked the March on Washington, and attracted many women, including celebrities and students from around the nation. A similar march took place in Los Angeles a week later.

=== Domestic violence ===
In 1991, there were roughly 1 million incidents reported of domestic violence towards women, and another 3 million incidents were predicted as unreported. Domestic violence had become so common in society at the time that it had been named the top health risk against women. She was a founding member of "New Jersey Women Take Back the Night," an organization that helped to generate public awareness for violence against women. This group also lobbied legislators to gain support for the movement to stop violence against women, and create laws to protect women. This was the start to the idea of the Violence Against Women Act. She has also supported women who have faced domestic violence through her work to create a battered women's shelter in New Jersey called Womanspace.

=== Gay rights ===
Being an openly gay women, she also advocated for gay rights. During this time, gay couples were not able to have the same rights and privileges as heterosexual married couples. This meant they were barred from the hospital rooms where their partners were being treated, or they were thrown out of their houses after their partners' death. They did not have the same protections as their heterosexual counterparts. Dempsey was a lawyer in many cases revolving around these issues, and fought for equal rights for gay people. She also chaired a coalition to pass lesbian and gay rights legislation in New Jersey.

=== Mitsubishi lawsuit ===
Dempsey traveled to Tokyo in 1996 to raise awareness about a sexual harassment issue between Mitsubishi and hundreds of women that were employed by them. Dempsey was doing a lot of talking during her trip with many officials from Tokyo including Mitsubishi Motors representatives. With her help and others, the EEOC, sued Mitsubishi which eventually agreed to pay $34 million in a settlement.

== Personal life ==
Dempsey was born in Connecticut in 1946, and earned her bachelor's degree in New York before moving to New Jersey for law school. She did most of her activist work out of New Jersey, and raised her two children there as well who were born in 1969 and 1970.

She gained national media attention after gaining full custody of her two children even though she was openly gay in 1979. This made it easier for future homosexual couples looking to gain legal custody of their children. She and her long-time partner, Kim Costanza, owned a gay restaurant, bar and guest house in Pass-A-Grille, Florida that has since been closed.
