= Thomas Dempsey =

Thomas or Tom Dempsey may refer to:

- Thomas W. Dempsey (born 1931), American politician in Pennsylvania
- Tom Dempsey (1947–2020), American football player
- Tom Dempsey (hurler) (born 1965), Irish hurler
- Tom Dempsey (Missouri politician) (born 1967), American restaurateur and politician
- Tommy Dempsey (born 1974), American basketball coach
