= Jack Dempsey (rugby league) =

Australian rugby league player (1907–1951)

Personal information
- Full name: John Wilson Dempsey
- Born: 1907 Kalgoorlie, Western Australia, Australia
- Died: 21 July 1951 (aged 43–44) Moore Park, New South Wales, Australia

Playing information
- Position: Halfback
Club
Years	Team	Pld	T	G	FG	P
1929	St. George	13	0	0	0	0
Representative
Years	Team	Pld	T	G	FG	P
1928	New South Wales	4	1	3	0	12
1928	NSW Country	2	2	4	0	14

John Wilson Dempsey (1907-1951) was an Australian rugby league footballer who played in the 1920s and 1930s.

== Career ==
Regarded by many as one of the best halfbacks that came from the Newcastle area, Jack 'Inky' Dempsey came to Sydney for one season and played for St. George in 1929. He later captained/coached many country teams, including Moree, New South Wales. He represented Newcastle against touring English teams in 1928, 1932, and 1936. 'Inky' Dempsey retired from playing in 1937 at Kurri Kurri, New South Wales.

== Death ==
Jack 'Inky' Dempsey collapsed and died in a wild brawl on the hill at the Sydney Cricket Ground during a Test Match between Australia v France on 21 July 1951. His lifeless body was carried down from the 'Hill' and placed on a stretcher on the SCG pitch in view of all 67,000 spectators. He left a wife and three children, and was buried at Sandgate Cemetery on 24 July 1951.
