= Mick Dempsey (hurler) =

Irish retired sportsperson

Personal information
- Native name: Mícheál Ó Díomsaigh (Irish)
- Born: 1941 (age 84–85) Waterford, Ireland
- Height: 5 ft 8 in (173 cm)

Sport
- Sport: Hurling
- Position: Midfield
Club
- Years: Club
- 1950s-1970s: Mount Sion
Inter-county
- Years: County
- 1960s: Waterford
Inter-county titles
- Munster titles: 1
- All-Irelands: 0
- NHL: 0
- All Stars: 0

Mick Dempsey (born 1941 in Waterford, Ireland) is an Irish retired sportsperson. He played hurling with his local club Mount Sion and was a member of the Waterford senior inter-county team in the 1960s.
