= Mark Dempsey =

Mark Dempsey may refer to:

- Mark Dempsey (English footballer) (born 1964), English coach and former footballer
- Mark Dempsey (Irish footballer) (born 1972), Irish association football player
- Mark Dempsey (baseball) (born 1957), former Major League Baseball pitcher
