= Maximilian O'Dempsey, 3rd Viscount Clanmalier =

Maximilian O'Dempsey, 3rd Viscount Clanmalier (died 1691) was an Irish aristocrat.

He was the son of Lewis O'Dempsey, 2nd Viscount Clanmalier and succeeded him in 1683. He was of mixed Gaelic and Old English descent. He was a Roman Catholic and a supporter of his fellow Catholic King James II during the Williamite War in Ireland. He was appointed Governor of Queen's County by James and attended the Irish House of Lords in the Patriot Parliament of 1689.

He died in 1691. Although he had been married twice, to Anne Bermingham and Margaret FitzMaurice, he was childless and his title became extinct.

== Bibliography ==
- D'Alton, John. King James's Irish Army List. The Celtic Bookshop, 1997

Peerage of Ireland
Preceded by Lewis O'Dempsey	Viscount Clanmalier; 1683–1691	Attainted
