= Gary Dempsey =

Gary Dempsey may refer to:

- Gary Dempsey (Australian footballer) (born 1948), former Australian rules footballer
- Gary Dempsey (Irish footballer) (born 1981), Irish footballer for Bray Wanderers
