= John Church Dempsey =

English artist (1802–1877)

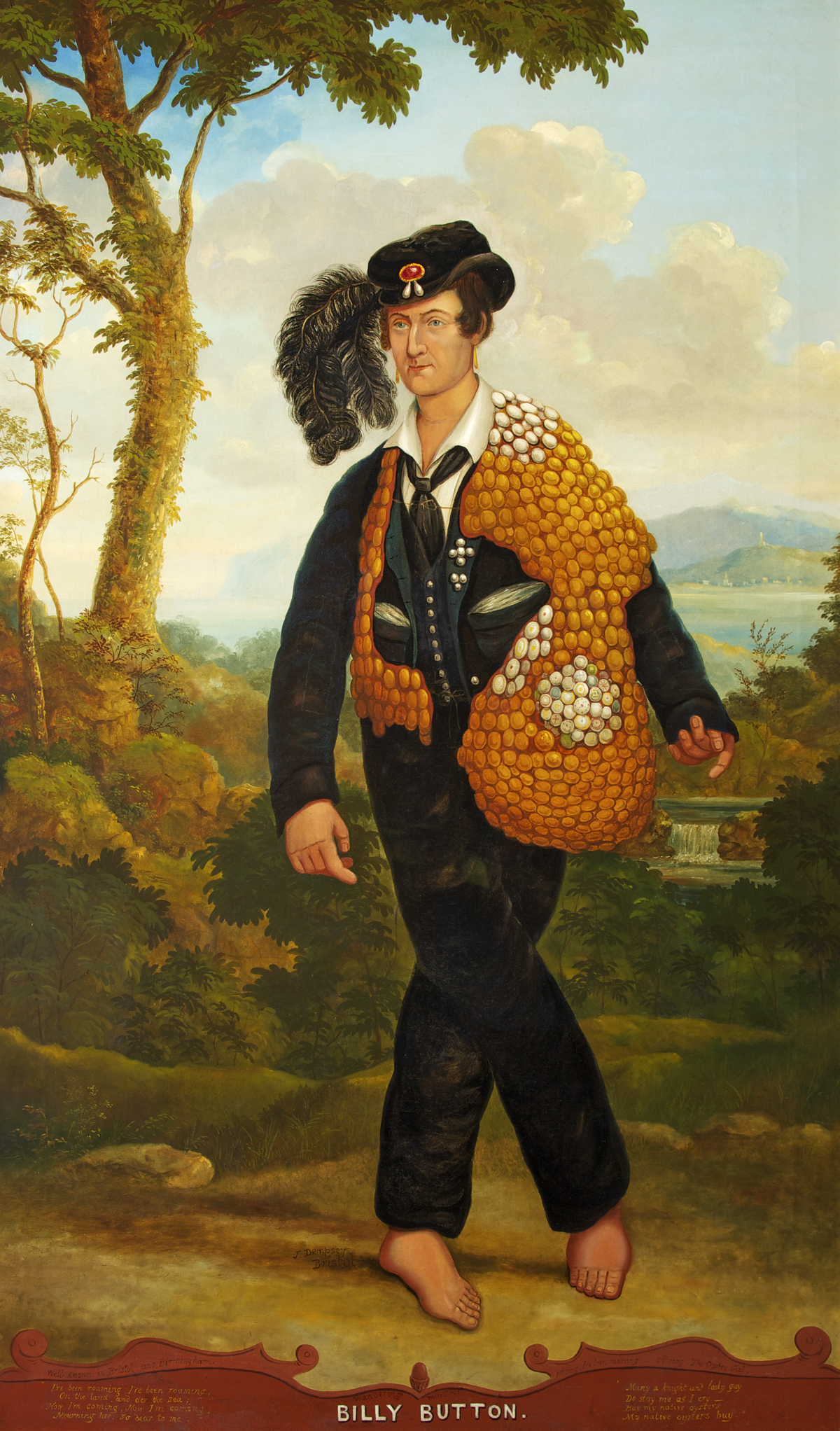
Dempsey's painting 'The Singing Minstrel', depicting travelling singer Billy Button (1778–1838)

John Church Dempsey (1802–1877) was an English artist specialising in portraiture. He operated a stationery shop in Bristol, but in 1845 he was declared bankrupt and his effects were seized. After this he became semi-itinerant, travelling as far afield as Norwich and Durham. He painted miniatures and silhouette portraits primarily, as well as the occasional full canvas. In later life (after 1850) he took up photography.

Possible because of his vagrant lifestyle, Dempsey primarily depicted beggars, buskers and other itinerant persons in his works, although he took commissions from the wealthy as well, painting the Lord Mayor of London as well as members of the Liverpool Stock Exchange. His works are of interest to historians as they document the rise of the "urban proletariat" in Britain.
