= Yauheni Preiherman =

Belarusian political scientist and analyst

- Born: August 6, 1986 (age 40); Vitsebsk
- Education: Belarusian State University (2009); University of Sussex (2010); University of Warwick (2021)
- Occupations: Founder and director, minsk dialogue council on international relations

Yauheni Preiherman (Belarusian: Яўген Леакардзьевіч Прэйгерман, Russian: Евгений Леокардьевич Прейгерман, born August 6, 1986) is a Belarusian political scientist and analyst who specializes in international affairs and regional security in Eastern Europe and heads the Minsk Dialogue Council on International Relations.

== Biography ==
Yauheni Preiherman was born in Vitsebsk.

In 2004 he won the national olympiad in the English language and was admitted to the Faculty of International Relations of the Belarusian State University, which he graduated from with a distinction in 2009.

In 2006–2007 he studied at the Higher People's School Litorina in Karlskrona (Sweden), in 2010 he received a master's degree in European Politics (and a special Jean Monnet prize for the best overall performance on the course) from the University of Sussex.

In 2021 he received a PhD in Politics and International Studies from the University of Warwick. His thesis dealt with foreign policy strategies of small states that sit in-between centres of geopolitical gravity and have asymmetric relations with them. In the thesis, Yauheni offered an innovative theoretical model of foreign policy hedging and an explanation of its sources and limitations for small in-between states.

Preiherman's articles and comments have been published by numerous internationally renowned newspapers and think tanks, including Foreign Affairs, Carnegie Endowment for International Peace, European Council on Foreign Relations, Valdai Discussion Club, The Moscow Times, Carnegie Europe, Carnegie Moscow Center, Heinrich Böll Stiftung, Italian Institute for International Political Studies, etc.

As a student Yauheni Preiherman organised a group called the Liberal Club (Russian: Либеральный клуб), which aimed at facilitating an inclusive political debate in Belarusian society and implemented research projects, mainly in the economic field.

In 2015 the Liberal Club became the basis for the Minsk Dialogue Track-2 Initiative, which offered a platform for international experts to address the crisis in/around Ukraine and its broader implications for regional security in Eastern Europe.

== Minsk Dialogue Council on International Relations and Minsk Dialogue Forum ==
After the success of its inaugural conference in March 2015, the Minsk Dialogue Track-2 Initiative started to host multiple international events of different formats (conferences, seminars, situational analysis sessions, panel discussions, and briefings) and publish regular research and analytical products. In April 2019, the initiative was officially registered as the Minsk Dialogue Council on International Relations. The mission of the Minsk Dialogue is to offer an open and geopolitically unbiased platform for research and discussion on international affairs and security in Eastern Europe. Regular Minsk Dialogue events gather international experts, as well as high-level officials and diplomats.

In early 2021 the Minsk Dialogue was named the second most quoted Belarusian think tank, according to a study by the ThinkTanks.by web-site.

In May 2018 the inaugural Minsk Dialogue Forum gathered over 500 participants from 59 countries, including leading international experts and high-profile diplomats and politicians. The Forum's title – Eastern Europe: In search of security for all – later became the Minsk Dialogue's motto. In October 2019, the second Minsk Dialogue Forum gathered over 700 participants from 61 countries. The annual event claimed to be a unique platform in Eastern Europe due to its ability to go beyond the echo chamber type of events and gather officials and experts from Russia, the United States, the EU, China, and East European countries for open and inclusive discussions "with one another, rather than about one another". According to the OSCE's former Secretary General Thomas Greminger, "the Minsk Dialogue Forum provides an excellent and most timely platform for informal discussion of the many complex challenges that confront us today".
