= Henry Willcox =

British Army officer (1889–1968)

Lieutenant-General Sir Henry Willcox KCIE CB DSO MC
- Born: 30 April 1889; New Zealand
- Died: 15 August 1968 (aged 79); Fremantle, Western Australia
- Military career
- Allegiance: United Kingdom
- Branch: New Zealand Military Forces; British Army
- Service years: 1910–1946
- Rank: Lieutenant-General
- Nickname: "Ulysses"
- Service number: 4694
- Units: Sherwood Foresters; East Lancashire Regiment
- Commands: 1st Battalion, East Lancashire Regiment; 15th Infantry Brigade; 13th Infantry Brigade; 42nd (East Lancashire) Infantry Division; I Corps; Central Command, India
- Conflicts: World War I World War II; Arab revolt in Palestine
- Awards: Knight Commander of the Order of the Indian Empire; Companion of the Order of the Bath; Distinguished Service Order; Military Cross; Mentioned in dispatches (5)

Lieutenant-General Sir Henry Beresford Dennitts Willcox KCIE CB DSO MC (30 April 1889 – 15 August 1968) was a British Army officer who served during World War I and World War II.

During the First World War, he served as a staff officer with the Egyptian Expeditionary Force and was attached to headquarters, before being appointed a general staff officer, Grade 2 (GSO2), with the temporary rank of major, and was also awarded the Distinguished Service Order. During the Second World War, he became general officer commanding GOC 42nd (East Lancashire) Infantry Division and then became GOC I Corps, stationed in Northern England under Northern Command and was responsible for the defence of Lincolnshire and the East Riding of Yorkshire.

== Early life and military career ==
Born in New Zealand, Willcox was commissioned into the Sherwood Foresters of the British Army from the New Zealand Military Forces on 20 December 1911. He was posted to the regiment's 2nd Battalion, then stationed in Sheffield.

Shortly after the outbreak of World War I in August 1914, Willcox's battalion, serving as part of the 18th Brigade of the 6th Division, was sent to the Western Front, landing at St-Nazaire, France on 11 September. Just days later the battalion was engaged in heavy fighting and, while still only a second lieutenant, he was appointed the battalion adjutant on 21 September as the previous adjutant had been killed in action. He was promoted to the temporary rank of lieutenant on 21 October 1914 (substantive from 21 November) and awarded the Military Cross (MC) on 18 February 1915. He was promoted to the temporary rank of captain on 1 May 1915, relinquishing this rank on 14 December. Seconded to the staff as a temporary captain on 22 March 1916, he was appointed a brigade major on 29 June and was promoted to the substantive rank of captain on 1 October. He served ultimately as a staff officer with the Egyptian Expeditionary Force (EEF) in 1917. He was attached to headquarters on 9 November 1917. On 16 December 1917, he was appointed a General staff Officer Grade 2 (GSO2) with the temporary rank of major and was also awarded the Distinguished Service Order (DSO) around this time. He relinquished this post and rank on 1 July 1918 and was reappointed in the same rank and position on 1 March 1919. During the war Willcox was, in addition to being awarded the MC and DSO, wounded twice and mentioned in dispatches five times.

== Between the wars ==
After the war he married, in 1919, and became a GSO3 in his substantive rank of captain on 25 February 1920. He served initially in Home Forces, then at Aldershot, in Mesopotamia and Iraq, then at Southern Command and finally attended the Staff College, Camberley from 1925 to 1926. Among his fellow students there included Ronald Scobie, Philip Whitcombe, Francis Tuker, Roland Le Fanu, Frank Messervy, William Morgan, Raymond Briggs, Gordon Grimsdale, Ralph Deedes, Alan Pigott, John Swayne, Brocas Burrows, Douglas McConnel, Leonard Hawes, Eric Harrison, William Oxley and Langley Browning, all of whom would become general officers. He relinquished his position of brigade major on 5 December 1922, and was appointed a GSO3 on 21 January 1927. On 9 July 1927, he transferred from the Sherwood Foresters to the East Lancashire Regiment to receive a promotion to major (with seniority backdated to 2 June 1927), and brevetted to lieutenant colonel on 1 July 1929. On 21 January 1930, he returned to the Staff College, Camberley upon being appointed as a GSO2 instructor.

Relinquishing this appointment in early 1933, Willcox was then selected to attend the Imperial Defence College, and, promoted on 8 November 1934 to lieutenant colonel, was appointed as commanding officer (CO) of the 1st Battalion, East Lancashire Regiment. Promoted to the temporary rank of colonel on 15 September 1936, he then became assistant adjutant general for Palestine and Transjordan during the early stages of the Arab revolt in Palestine, before reverting to lieutenant colonel on 7 December 1936 and relinquishing the appointment on the same date. On 29 June 1937, his permanent rank was advanced to colonel (with seniority backdated to 1 July 1933) and, on the same date, was made an instructor at the Staff College, Quetta in India. He returned to England and, promoted to the temporary rank of brigadier on 16 October, took command of the 15th Infantry Brigade in succession to Brigadier Archibald Beauman. Handing over the brigade to Brigadier Horatio Berney-Ficklin in July 1939, he succeeded Brigadier Reade Godwin-Austen in command of the 13th Infantry Brigade. Both brigades formed part of the 5th Infantry Division, whose general officer commanding (GOC) was the then-Major General Harold Franklyn.

== World War II ==
He served in World War II, leading his brigade overseas to France in mid-September 1939, shortly after the war began, as part of General Lord Gort's British Expeditionary Force (BEF). Instead of being involved in immediate action as in World War I, however, Willcox's brigade, sent initially as an independent formation under GHQ BEF as the 5th Division was not yet fully formed, was relegated to guard duties in the BEF's rear areas in Nantes, with little time being allotted to training for operations. On 19 November, however, after handing over command of the 13th Brigade to Miles Dempsey, who had been one of his students at the Staff College, Camberley in the early 1930s, Willcox was ordered to return to England and, promoted to the acting rank of major general on 21 November, was made inspector of infantry at the War Office, responsible for the training of the infantry of the British Army. His rank of major general was made permanent on 9 March 1940 (with seniority backdated to 19 July 1938). He held this post until 18 June 1940, handing over to Major General Charles Loyd, when he was given command of a division, becoming GOC of the 42nd (East Lancashire) Infantry Division in succession to Major General William Holmes, also of the East Lancashire Regiment, who was promoted to command X Corps.

A first-line Territorial Army (TA) formation then stationed in Yorkshire, the division – comprising George Sutton's 125th, Eric Miles's 126th and John Smyth's 127th Infantry Brigades, plus divisional troops – had recently fought in France and subsequently participated in the Dunkirk evacuation, suffering severe losses in both manpower and equipment and needed to be brought up to strength to face a potential German invasion of Britain which, in the aftermath of the French surrender, was considered highly likely. The 42nd, then serving under William Holmes's X Corps, was rapidly brought up to strength in men by absorbing thousands of conscripts – few of whom had had any sort of military experience – although the division was still very short on equipment of all sorts and, throughout the year and into 1941, the division moved numerous times around the country, alternating between beach defence and training to repel the expected German invasion.

Willcox remained with the 42nd Division until late April 1941 when, after handing over the division to Major General Eric Miles, he was promoted to the rank of acting lieutenant general on 12 May and became GOC of I Corps, succeeding Lieutenant General Laurence Carr. The corps had then the 1st and 2nd Infantry Divisions (commanded by Major Generals Edwin Morris and Daril Watson, respectively), along with the Lincolnshire and Yorkshire County Divisions (under Major Generals Kenneth Hay and Edward Lawson) under control. I Corps was stationed in Northern England under Northern Command and was responsible for the defence of Lincolnshire and the East Riding of Yorkshire. However, in October 1941, General Sir Alan Brooke, the Commander-in-Chief, Home Forces, who had been one of "Ulysses" Willcox's instructors at the Staff College, Camberley in the mid-1920s and soon to become Chief of the Imperial General Staff (CIGS), believed Willcox to be out of his depth in corps command, claiming him, along with Ridley Pakenham-Walsh, the GOC of IX Corps stationed further north, to be "quite incapable of handling the forces under orders!" Therefore, several months later, in May 1942, Willcox was replaced by Lieutenant General Frederick Morgan, who was nearly five years younger. Willcox was then sent to India to become GOC Central Command, India and, in 1944, he became chairman of the Indian Army Reorganisation Committee, set up to consider India's postwar needs.

== Postwar ==
After a military career spanning three decades, and with the war over, Willcox, after being knighted, retired from the army in August 1946, retaining the honorary rank of lieutenant general. He was colonel of the Sherwood Foresters from February 1946, when he took over from Lieutenant General Sir Douglas Brownrigg, until 1947.

== Bibliography ==
- Alanbrooke, Field Marshal Lord (2001). Danchev, Alex; Todman, Daniel (eds.). War Diaries 1939–1945. Phoenix Press. ISBN 1-84212-526-5.
- Smart, Nick (2005). Biographical Dictionary of British Generals of the Second World War. Barnesley: Pen & Sword. ISBN 1844150496.

Military offices
Preceded by William Holmes	GOC 42nd (East Lancashire) Infantry Division; 1940–1941	Succeeded by Eric Miles
Preceded by Laurence Carr	GOC I Corps; 1941–1942	Succeeded by Frederick Morgan
Preceded by New post	GOC-in-C Central Command, India; 1942–1944	Succeeded by Sir Geoffrey Scoones
Honorary titles
Preceded by Douglas Brownrigg	Colonel of the Sherwood Foresters; 1946–1947	Succeeded by Percival White
