= Burma Command =

- Active: 1937 to 1942; 1945 to 1948
- Country: United Kingdom
- Branch: British Army
- Type: Command
- Garrison/HQ: Rangoon

Burma Command was a British Army command formed for the coordination of the defences of Burma. It functioned from 1937 to 1942, when the country fell to Japanese Forces during the Second World War, and functioned again from 1945 to 1948, when the country secured independence from the UK.

== History ==
Before the formation of the command, Burma had functioned as independent district within the British Indian Army. The last General Officer Commanding Burma Independent District was Major-General William Twiss who commanded from 1936 to 1937. In April 1937, when Burma became a semi-autonomous country, it was decided to separate the command from the British Indian Army. Initially Burma Command came under the direct command of the Governor of British Burma as commander-in-chief. However with the Second World War imminent, responsibility was delegated to Lieutenant-General Kenneth McLeod as the first General Officer Commanding in January 1939.

Once Rangoon had fallen to Japanese troops on the 5/6 March 1942 and Mandalay had fallen shortly thereafter, the command was disbanded.

After the war it was reformed from the core of the Twelfth Army on 1 October 1945 consisting not just British and Indian Army units but also of the Patriot Burmese Forces. It was disbanded again when Burma became an independent country under the Burma Independence Act 1947 in January 1948.

== Commanders ==
Commanders included:

- Lieutenant-General Kenneth McLeod: 1939 – 1941
- Lieutenant-General Thomas Hutton: 1941 – 1942
- General Sir Harold Alexander: March 1942 – May 1942

Under Japanese rule from 1942 to 1945

- Lieutenant-General Harold Briggs: 1945 – 1948
