= Donald Kenneth McLeod =

British Indian Army general (1885–1958)

Sir Donald Kenneth McLeod
- Born: 19 June 1895
- Died: 25 October 1958 (aged 63)
- Military career
- Allegiance: United Kingdom
- Branch: British Indian Army
- Service years: 1904–1942
- Rank: Lieutenant-General
- Service number: 24126
- Commands: Burma Command; 1st (Risalpur) Cavalry Brigade; 4th (Secunderabad) Cavalry Brigade
- Conflicts: First World War; Second World War
- Awards: Knight Commander of the Order of the Indian Empire; Companion of the Order of the Bath; Distinguished Service Order; Mentioned in Despatches

Lieutenant-General Sir Donald Kenneth McLeod, KCIE, CB, DSO, DL (19 June 1885 – 25 October 1958) was a British Indian Army officer.

== Military career ==
McLeod was commissioned into the Indian Army on 29 November 1904. He earned recognition with his appointment as a companion of the Distinguished Service Order in the 1917 New Year Honours during the First World War.

He became commanding officer Guides Cavalry in India in 1928, commander of the 4th (Secunderabad) Cavalry Brigade in 1933 and commander of the 1st (Risalpur) Cavalry Brigade in 1934. He went on to be deputy adjutant and quartermaster general, Northern Command, India in 1937 and, having been appointed a Companion of the Order of the Bath on 11 May 1937, he became general officer commanding Burma Command in January 1939 before retiring in 1942. He was appointed a Knight Commander of the Order of the Indian Empire in the 1942 New Year Honours.

He became a deputy lieutenant for Inverness-shire in 1955.

== Bibliography ==
- Smart, Nick (2005). Biographical Dictionary of British Generals of the Second World War. Barnesley: Pen & Sword. ISBN 1844150496.

Military offices
Preceded by William Twiss (As GOC Burma Independent District)	GOC Burma Command; 1939–1941	Succeeded by Thomas Hutton
