= Eric Miles =

British Army general (1891–1977)

Major-General Eric Miles CB DSO MC
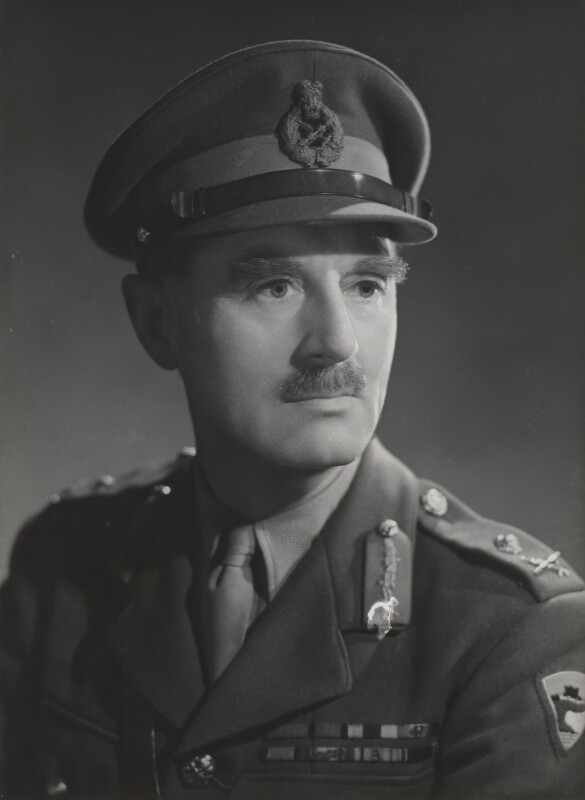
- Miles in 1944
- Born: 11 August 1891; Welwyn, Hertfordshire, England
- Died: 3 November 1977 (aged 86); Newport, Shropshire, England
- Military career
- Allegiance: United Kingdom
- Branch: British Army
- Service years: 1911–1946
- Rank: Major-General
- Nicknames: "Tiger Miles" "Miles the soldier"
- Service number: 20038
- Units: King's Own Scottish Borderers; Royal Berkshire Regiment
- Commands: South-Eastern Command (1944); 56th (London) Infantry Division (1941–43); 42nd (East Lancashire) Infantry Division (1941); 126th Infantry Brigade (1940); 1st Battalion, Royal Berkshire Regiment (1936–38)
- Conflicts: First World War; Second World War
- Awards: Companion of the Order of the Bath; Distinguished Service Order; Military Cross; Mentioned in Despatches (6)

Major-General Eric Grant Miles, CB, DSO, MC (11 August 1891 – 3 November 1977) was a senior British Army officer who saw active service during both the First and Second World Wars, where he commanded the 126th Infantry Brigade in the Battle of France and the 56th (London) Infantry Division in the final stages of the Tunisian Campaign.

== Early life and military career ==
Born on 11 August 1891, the second son of George Herbert Miles, Eric Grant Miles was educated at Harrow School and the Royal Military College, Sandhurst, where he was commissioned as a second lieutenant into the King's Own Scottish Borderers (KOSB) on 3 June 1911. Upon passing out from Sandhurst, Miles was posted to the 2nd Battalion, KOSB, then serving in Belfast, Ireland.

Upon the outbreak of the First World War in August 1914, Miles, with his battalion, then serving in Dublin as part of the 13th Brigade of the 5th Division, was sent overseas to France, landing at Le Havre on 15 August, as part of the British Expeditionary Force (BEF). Promoted to the temporary rank of lieutenant on 27 August 1914, Miles, his rank of lieutenant made permanent, participated in all the major battles in which the battalion was engaged that year, beginning with the Battle of Mons and the subsequent retreat, and culminating in the First Battle of Ypres, where Miles's battalion suffered very heavy losses, although Miles himself survived unscathed and, from 18 November 1914, was seconded to the Army Signal Service. During the Battle of Hill 60 in April–May 1915, Miles, while attached to the 5th Signal Company, Royal Engineers, was awarded the Military Cross (MC) on 23 July 1915. The citation read:

For conspicuous gallantry. During a critical period in the attack on "Hill 60" and neighbouring trenches on May 1st, 1915, he succeeded in mending the telephone wire along the railway cutting under such heavy shell fire that messengers were unable to get through.

He later became a staff officer for the rest of the war, remaining on the Western Front throughout the conflict. After receiving a promotion to temporary captain on 1 September 1915 (made permanent on 25 January 1916), in March 1916, he was appointed a brigade major with the 54th Brigade, part of Major-General Ivor Maxse's 18th (Eastern) Division, a Kitchener's Army formation composed largely of civilian volunteers, which saw service, and suffered heavy casualties, that summer during the Somme offensive. On 4 June 1917 Miles was awarded the Distinguished Service Order (DSO), "for distinguished service in the field", and, from July 1917 he served as a General Staff Officer Grade 3 (GSO3) until 23 September 1918, during the Hundred Days Offensive and shortly before the end of the war, when he was wounded in action and returned to England, to become a GSO2 at the Staff School, Cambridge. During the war Miles was five times mentioned in dispatches.

== Between the wars ==
Promoted to brevet major on 1 January 1919, Miles continued to serve in a variety of staff positions, notably as a GSO2 with the British Army of the Rhine (BAOR) from 1919 to 1920. He then attended the Staff College, Camberley from 1921 to 1922. His many fellow students there included a large number of future general officers; Frank Roberts, Merton Beckwith-Smith, James Gammell, Eric Costin, Francis Nosworthy, Edmund Osborne, Robert Naylor, John Priestman, Giffard Martel, Ernest Squires, Edward Alban, John Kennedy, Ralph Eastwood, Russell Gurney, Edwin Morris, Austin Miller and Ridley Pakenham-Walsh. After this, Miles served as a GSO3 at the War Office from 1923 to 1924, the year he married Lady Marcia Valda, youngest daughter of Robert Jocelyn, 7th Earl of Roden, on 23 August; they had a daughter. Following a three-year posting as GSO Weapon Training with Southern Command, he then became a brigade major with the Shanghai Defence Force from 1927 to 1928, the year in which his rank of major was confirmed.

Returning to England in 1930, he spent until early 1934 as a GSO2 at the War Office, during which time he was promoted to brevet lieutenant colonel in July 1931, before attending the Imperial Defence College, later in 1934. In 1936, now a permanent lieutenant colonel, he was given a field command, being appointed Commanding Officer (CO) of the 1st Battalion, Royal Berkshire Regiment, then stationed in Southern England, with Major Miles Dempsey as second-in-command (2-i-c). Handing over command of the battalion to Dempsey in early 1938, he was promoted to colonel and posted to Malaya where he became a GSO1 with Malaya Command.

== Second World War ==
Still in Malaya when the Second World War broke out in September 1939, later in the year he returned to England where, promoted to acting brigadier, Miles assumed command in January 1940 of the 126th Infantry Brigade, part of the 42nd (East Lancashire) Infantry Division, a first-line Territorial Army (TA) formation, whose General Officer Commanding (GOC) was Major General William Holmes. The brigade was in Wiltshire, training for overseas service and, in mid-April he led the brigade overseas to join the British Expeditionary Force (BEF) in France.

Posted to the Belgian border soon after, the German Army invaded France on 10 May, less than a month after the brigade's arrival, and the brigade, along with the rest of the division, was initially held in reserve until being ordered to advance to the River Escaut. On 22 May the Germans attacked the 42nd Division heavily along its entire front, and by the end of the day, after several hours of confused fighting, was ordered to retreat to Dunkirk, where the rest of the BEF, now cut off from most of the French Army further south, was already converging. The brigade, after temporarily coming under the command of the 1st Division for the final stages of the fighting in the Dunkirk perimeter, was evacuated from Dunkirk on the night of 1 June, along with Miles himself, and returning to 42nd Division command the day after. The brigade, during the fighting, had suffered heavy losses in both manpower and equipment, but had gained one of the first Victoria Crosses (VC) of the war, belonging to Captain Marcus Ervine-Andrews of the 1st Battalion, East Lancashire Regiment.

Miles continued to command the brigade after its return to England, training it in preparation for the expected German invasion of England and at the same time absorbing conscripts to bring the brigade up to strength after its heavy casualties. He became Brigadier General Staff (BGS) of Home Forces in mid-September before returning to the 42nd Division in late April 1941, this time as its GOC, succeeding Major General Henry Willcox, who in turn had succeeded Major General Holmes the previous June, Miles in turn receiving a promotion to acting major general in May. He was promoted to permanent major general in June. The division comprised, in addition to Miles's old 126th Brigade, the 125th and 127th Infantry Brigades, and divisional troops, and was serving in Eastern Command in East Anglia as part of Lieutenant General Hugh Massy's XI Corps. The division's main role was that of a static beach defence, and training to repel an invasion.

In early October, however, he left the division and was appointed GOC of the 56th (London) Infantry Division, succeeding Major General Montagu Stopford. The division, like the 42nd, was a first-line TA formation, composed of the 167th, 168th and 169th Infantry Brigades and divisional troops, and was stationed in Kent under Lieutenant-General Bernard Montgomery's XII Corps, itself under South-Eastern Command, responsible for the defence of the Home Counties. In mid-November the division moved to Eastern Command in East Anglia, joining XI Corps, then commanded by Lieutenant General Noel Irwin.

As part of the Tenth Army, his division was stationed in Persia in late 1942. At that time, the Tenth Army was part of Paiforce (formerly Iraqforce) under Persia and Iraq Command. On 1 January 1943 Miles was made a Companion of the Order of the Bath (CB). During a reconnaissance into Tunisia during the last stages of the campaign there, he was wounded in the head by artillery in early May 1943 and returned to the United Kingdom.

Later in 1943, after recovering from his injury, he became GOC Kent and South East Districts and, in September 1944, as an acting lieutenant general, he took over as General Officer Commanding-in-Chief (GOC-in-C) of South-Eastern Command.

== Postwar ==
Miles retired from the army, after a career spanning thirty-five years, in September 1946, retaining his permanent rank of major general. He served as Colonel of his old regiment, the King's Own Scottish Borderers, from 19 June 1944 until 19 June 1954. He was Deputy Chairman of the Lichfield Diocesan Board of Finance from 1954 to 1960, becoming Chairman from 1960 to 1971, and became a member of the House of Laity, Church Assembly from 1955 to 1960. Miles retired to Shropshire, where he lived at Tilstock near Whitchurch before moving in 1956 to his last home, Rope Walk on Lyth Hill near Shrewsbury. After the death of his wife in 1972, his last five years were spent as a widower before he died at Brookfield Nursing Home in Newport, Shropshire on 3 November 1977. His funeral took place at Condover, Shropshire, on 9 November.

== Bibliography ==
- Montgomery, Bernard (2005). The Memoirs of Field Marshal Montgomery. Leo Cooper Ltd. ISBN 978-1844153305.
- Smart, Nick (2005). Biographical Dictionary of British Generals of the Second World War. Barnesley: Pen & Sword. ISBN 1844150496.
- Williams, David. The Black Cats at War: The Story of the 56th (London) Division T.A., 1939–1945 ISBN 1-870423-89-5.

Military offices
Preceded by Henry Willcox	GOC 42nd (East Lancashire) Infantry Division; April–October 1941	Succeeded by Miles Dempsey
Preceded by Montagu Stopford	GOC 56th (London) Infantry Division; 1941–1943	Succeeded by Douglas Graham
Preceded by Sir Edmond Schreiber	GOC-in-C South-Eastern Command; September–November 1944	Post disbanded
Honorary titles
Preceded by Sir Edward Broadbent	Colonel of the King's Own Scottish Borderers; 1944–1954	Succeeded by James Scott-Elliot
