= Ivo Vesey =

British Army officer

General Sir Ivo Vesey KCB KBE CMG DSO
- Vesey in 1920
- Born: 11 August 1876; Dorking, Surrey, England
- Died: 19 February 1975 (aged 98); Colchester, Essex, England
- Military career
- Allegiance: United Kingdom
- Branch: British Army
- Service years: 1897–1939; 1939–1945
- Rank: General
- Commands: Chief of the General Staff in India; Southern Command, India; Western Command, India; 48th South Midland Division
- Conflicts: Second Boer War; First World War; Second World War
- Awards: Knight Commander of the Order of the Bath; Knight Commander of the Order of the British Empire; Companion of the Order of St Michael and St George; Distinguished Service Order; Mentioned in Despatches

General Sir Ivo Lucius Beresford Vesey, KCB, KBE, CMG, DSO (11 August 1876 – 19 February 1975) was a British Army officer who served as Chief of the General Staff in India from 1937 to 1939.

== Military career ==
Born the second son of Major General George Henry Vesey and educated at Wellington College and the Royal Military College, Sandhurst, Vesey was commissioned as a second lieutenant in the Queen's Royal Regiment on 20 February 1897. He was promoted to lieutenant on 20 October 1898.He served in the Second Boer War of 1899–1902, where he was wounded in the Battle of Colenso on 15 December 1899, and later served in the Natal from March to June 1900, including action at Laing's Nek in June. While in South Africa, he was acting adjutant of the 2nd Battalion of his regiment from 15 May to 29 November 1900.

After peace was declared in May 1902, Vesey left South Africa on board the SS Bavarian and arrived in Britain the following month.

In May 1904 he was appointed an adjutant of his regiment. He attended the Staff College, Camberley.

In August 1911 he was appointed a brigade major and in April 1914 he was appointed as a general staff officer, grade 2 at the War Office, taking over from Brevet Lieutenant Colonel Lord Loch. In November he became an assistant military secretary.

Vesey later served in the First World War. In June 1915 he was appointed an assistant military secretary, which was graded as an assistant adjutant general (AAG) in terms of pay, and for which he was granted the temporary rank of lieutenant colonel whilst employed in this role. He was promoted to substantive major in September and brevet colonel in June 1918, and then became director of recruiting and organisation at the War Office in London in 1919.

He was appointed director of organisation and staff duties at the Air Ministry in 1923, was promoted to major general in September 1928, and was placed on half-pay in May 1929.

He became general officer commanding of 48th South Midland Division in April 1930 and director of staff duties at the War Office in June 1931. He went on to be General Officer Commanding-in-Chief at Western Command, India in 1935, General Officer Commanding-in-Chief at Southern Command, India in March 1936 and Chief of the General Staff in India in 1937 before retiring in 1939.

He served in the Second World War as a battalion commander in the Home Guard. He was also Colonel of the Queen's Royal Regiment from 1939 to 1945.

== Family ==
In 1913, Vesey married Geraldine Foley; they had two sons.

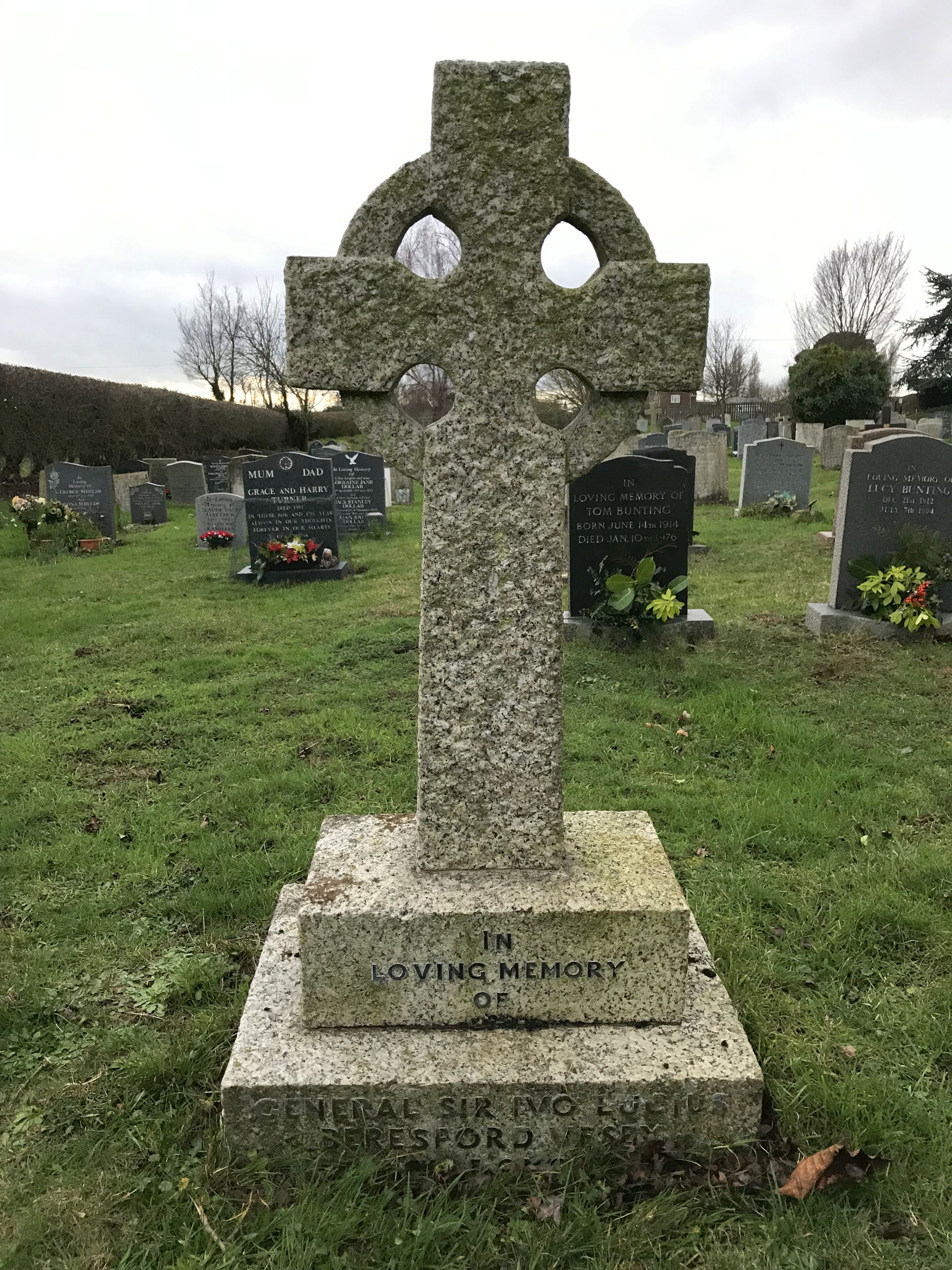
The grave of Ivo Vesey in the churchyard of St John the Baptist, Layer de la Haye, Essex.

== Honours and awards ==
Knight Commander of the Order of the Bath (KCB)	
Knight Commander of the Order of the British Empire (KBE)	
Companion of the Order of St Michael and St George (CMG)	
Companion of the Distinguished Service Order (DSO)	
Queen's South Africa Medal	with five clasps
King's South Africa Medal	with two clasps
1914 Star	with '5th Aug.-22nd Nov. 1914' clasp
British War Medal	
Victory Medal with palm for Mention in Despatches	
King George V Silver Jubilee Medal	1935
King George VI Coronation Medal	1937
Officer of the Order of the Crown	(Belgium)
Knight of the Order of Saints Maurice and Lazarus	(Italy)
Officer of the Legion of Honour	(France)
Croix de guerre	(Belgium)

Military offices
Preceded by Thomas Pitman	GOC 48th (South Midland) Division; 1930–1931	Succeeded by Cuthbert Fuller
Preceded by Sir Torquhil Matheson	GOC-in-C, Western Command, India; 1935–1936	Succeeded by Sir Walter Pitt-Taylor
Preceded by Sir George Jeffreys	GOC-in-C, Southern Command, India; 1936–1937	Succeeded by Sir John Brind
Preceded by Sir William Bartholomew	Chief of the General Staff (India); 1937–1939	Succeeded by Sir Eric de Burgh
Honorary titles
Preceded by Sir Wilkinson Bird	Colonel of the 2nd (The Queen's Royal) Regiment of Foot; 1939–1945	Succeeded by Sir George Giffard
