= Laurence Carr =

British Army general (1886–1954)

Lieutenant-General Laurence Carr CB DSO OBE
- Carr in 1942
- Born: 14 April 1886
- Died: 15 April 1954 (aged 68); Surrey, England
- Military career
- Allegiance: United Kingdom
- Branch: British Army
- Service years: 1904–1944
- Rank: Lieutenant-General
- Service number: 3469
- Unit: Gordon Highlanders
- Commands: Eastern Command (1941–1942); I Corps (1940–1941); 2nd Infantry Brigade (1936–1938)
- Conflicts: First World War; Arab revolt in Palestine; Second World War
- Awards: Companion of the Order of the Bath; Distinguished Service Order; Officer of the Order of the British Empire; Mentioned in Despatches

Lieutenant-General Laurence Carr, CB, DSO, OBE (14 April 1886 – 15 April 1954) was a senior British Army officer during the Second World War.

== Military career ==
Laurence Carr was commissioned into the Gordon Highlanders in 1904. He served in the First World War in France and Belgium. After the war he attended the Staff College, Camberley, and was deployed to India in 1920. He then held an appointment as GSO2 with Eastern Command, India, which he relinquished in January 1923 in order to take up a new position as an instructor, graded as a GSO2, at the Staff College, Quetta, the following month.

From 1931 Carr was a General Staff Officer at the War Office. He moved on to join the staff at the Imperial Defence College in 1934. He was appointed commander of the 2nd Infantry Brigade in 1936 and deployed to Palestine. He was on 30 June 1938 promoted to major general, with seniority backdated to 28 December 1937, and succeeded Ernest Squires as director of staff duties at the War Office in London.

Carr also served in the Second World War, initially as Assistant Chief of the Imperial General Staff and then as General Officer Commanding I Corps, which formed part of the British Expeditionary Force, deployed to France and Belgium in 1940. He became General Officer Commanding-in-Chief of Eastern Command in 1941. His last appointment was as Senior Military Assistant to the Ministry of Supply in 1942; he retired in 1944.

== Family ==
Carr was married to Elizabeth Montgomery Carr.

== Bibliography ==
- Smart, Nick (2005). Biographical Dictionary of British Generals of the Second World War. Barnesley: Pen & Sword. ISBN 1844150496.

Military offices
New title Post established	Assistant Chief of the Imperial General Staff; 1939–1940	Succeeded by Arthur Percival
Preceded by Sir Harold Alexander	GOC I Corps; 1940–1941	Succeeded by Henry Willcox
Preceded by Sir Guy Williams	GOC-in-C Eastern Command; 1941–1942	Succeeded by Sir Kenneth Anderson
