= Kenneth Wigram =

British general (1875–1949)

General Sir Kenneth Wigram GCB CSI CBE DSO
- Born: 5 December 1875
- Died: 11 July 1949 (aged 73)
- Military career
- Allegiance: United Kingdom
- Branch: British Indian Army
- Service years: 1896–1936
- Rank: General
- Commands: Northern Command, India (1934–36); Chief of the General Staff, India (1931–34); Waziristan District (c. 1926–30); Delhi Brigade Area (1922–24); 2nd Battalion, 2nd King Edward's Own Gurkha Rifles (The Sirmoor Rifles) (circa 1921)
- Conflicts: North-West Frontier; First World War
- Awards: Knight Grand Cross of the Order of the Bath; Companion of the Order of the Star of India; Commander of the Order of the British Empire; Distinguished Service Order; Knight of the Legion of Honour (France); Commander of the Order of the Crown (Belgium); Croix de guerre (Belgium); Knight Commander of the Order of the Crown of Siam

General Sir Kenneth Wigram, GCB, CSI, CBE, DSO (5 December 1875 – 11 July 1949) was a British Indian Army officer. From 1931 to 1934 he was Chief of the General Staff of the Indian Army. From 1934 to 1936 he was General Officer Commanding-in-Chief, Northern Command in India.

== Military career ==
Wigram was the son of Herbert Wigram, Indian Civil Service, and younger brother of Clive Wigram, 1st Baron Wigram. He was educated at Winchester College and was commissioned from the Royal Military College, Sandhurst as a Second Lieutenant, with a view to his appointment to the Indian Staff Corps on 22 January 1896, and was eventually posted to the 2nd King Edward VII's Own Gurkha Rifles (The Sirmoor Rifles).

He saw active service on North West Frontier of India from 1897 to 1898 and again from 1901 to 1902 before serving in Tibet from 1903 to 1904.

At the outbreak of the First World War, Wigram was a major serving as a staff officer at the Indian Army headquarters. He remained in staff posts during the war, including in June 1915 when he was made a GSO2, until February 1917 when he was promoted to temporary brigadier general and appointed Head of Operations (B) Section at the General Headquarters of the British Army in France. He was promoted to brevet colonel in January 1918. Later that year, at the start of October, he was granted an RAF commission as a temporary brigadier general and he served on the Air Staff until April 1919 when he returned to the Army.

He was appointed Director of Staff Duties at Army Headquarters in India in 1919, Commander of the Delhi Brigade Area in 1922 and Deputy Adjutant and Quartermaster General at Northern Command in India in 1924. He went on to be Commander of the Waziristan District in 1926 and was promoted to lieutenant general on 9 June 1929 Chief of the General Staff in India in 1931 and General Officer Commanding-in-Chief, Northern Command, India in 1934 before retiring in 1936.

He was appointed Colonel of the Colonel of the 2nd K.E. VII's Gurkha Rifles in 1930. He relinquished his appointment as Colonel of the 2nd K.E. VII's Gurkha Rifles, 5 Dec. 1945.

Military offices
Preceded by Sir Cyril Deverell	Chief of the General Staff, India; 1931–1934	Succeeded by Sir William Bartholomew
Preceded by Sir Robert Cassels	GOC-in-C, Northern Command, India; 1934–1936	Succeeded by Sir John Coleridge
