= Maudlins Cemetery =

Cemetery in County Kildare, Ireland

- Reilig na Maigdiléana
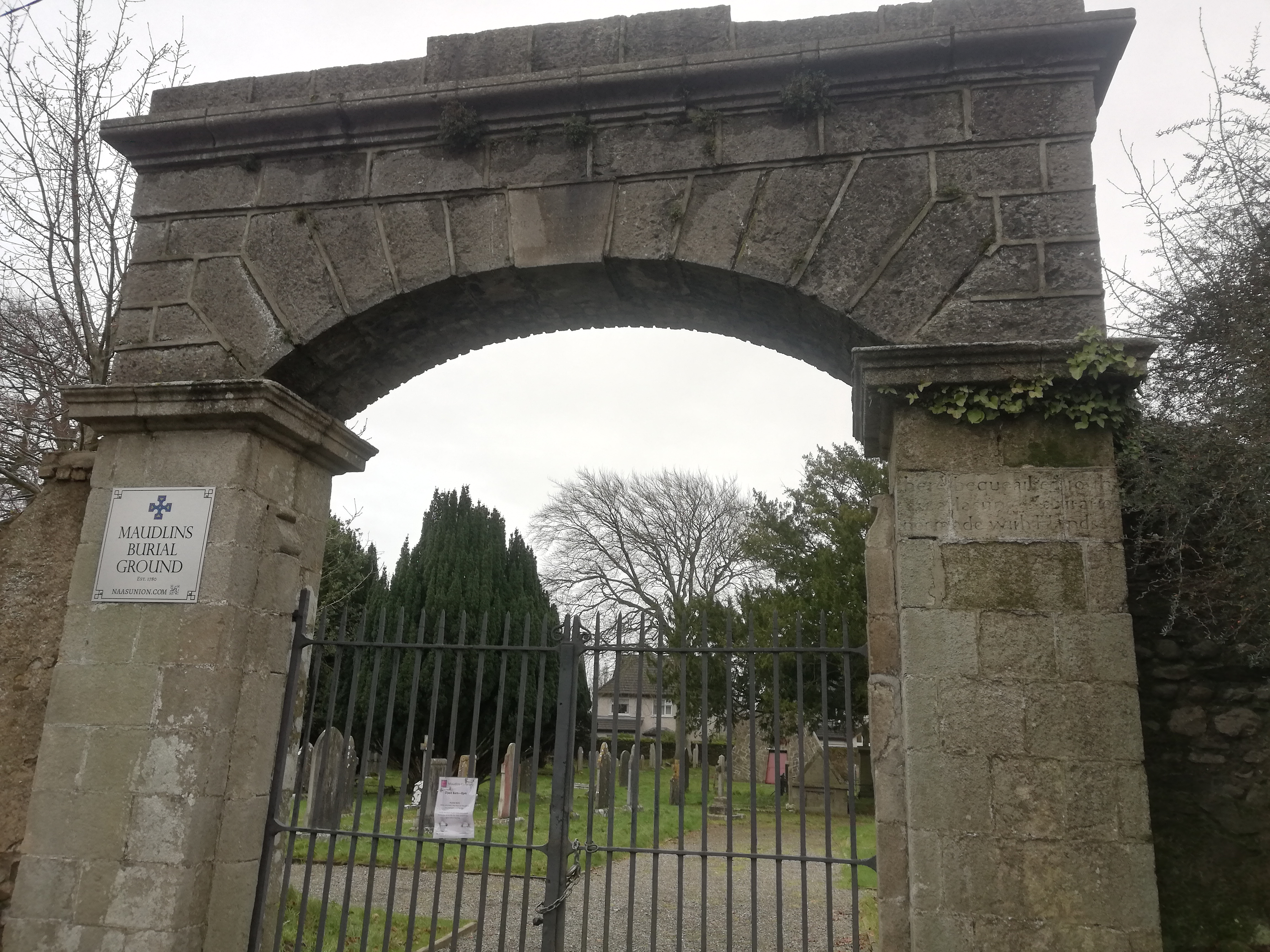
- Gateway arch
- Interactive map of Maudlins Cemetery

Details
- Established: 1782
- Location: Dublin Road, Maudlings, Naas, County Kildare
- Country: Ireland
- Coordinates: 53°13′38″N 6°38′48″W
- Type: garden cemetery
- Owned by: Naas Union of Parishes (Church of Ireland)
- Size: 0.532 ha (1.31 acres)
- No. of graves: 200+
- Website: naasunion.com

Maudlins Cemetery is a Church of Ireland cemetery located in Naas, Ireland. It is notable for its two large pyramid-shaped mausoleums, and as the burial place of much of the local anglo/norman aristocracy.

== History ==
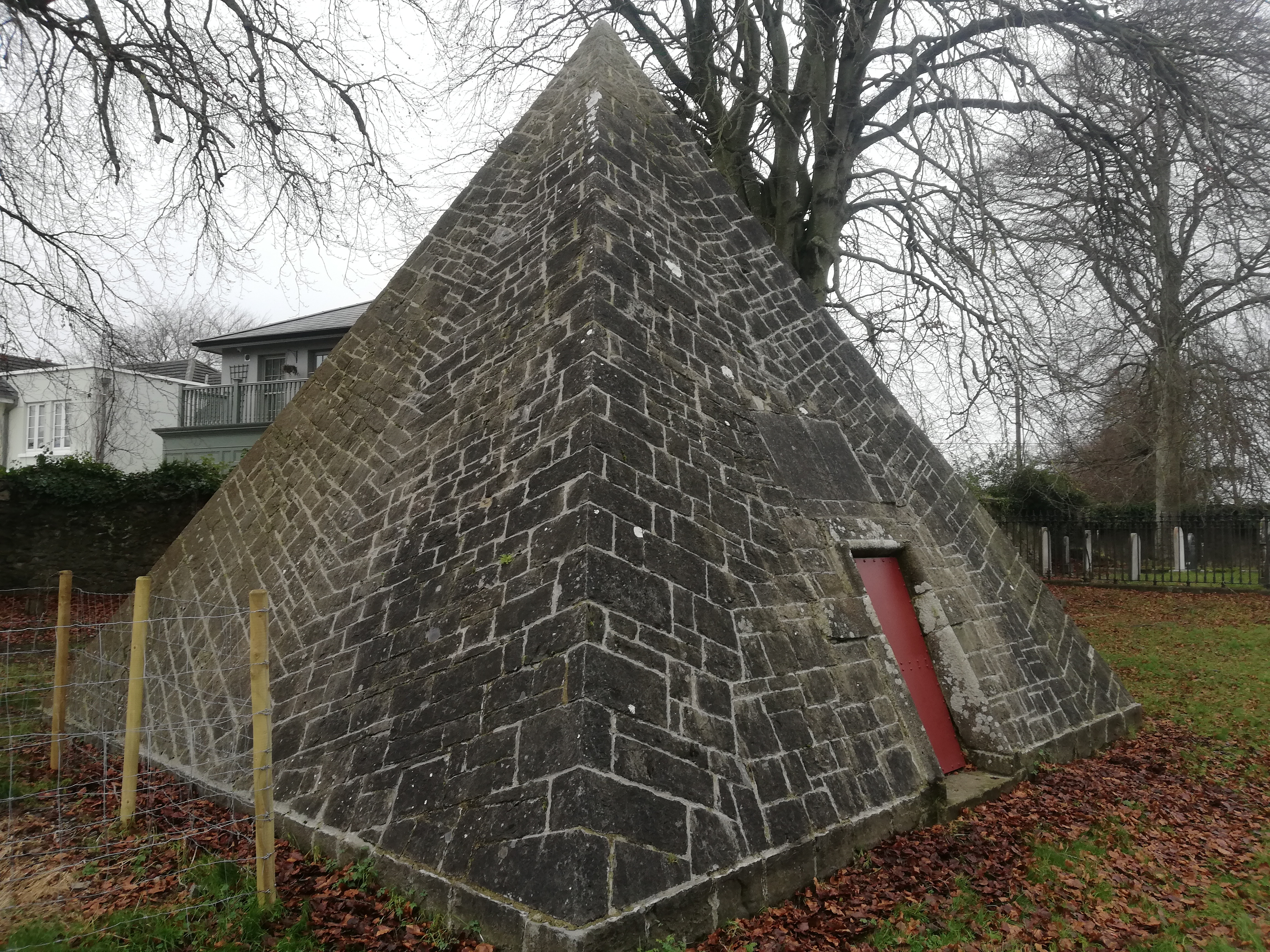
The west pyramid

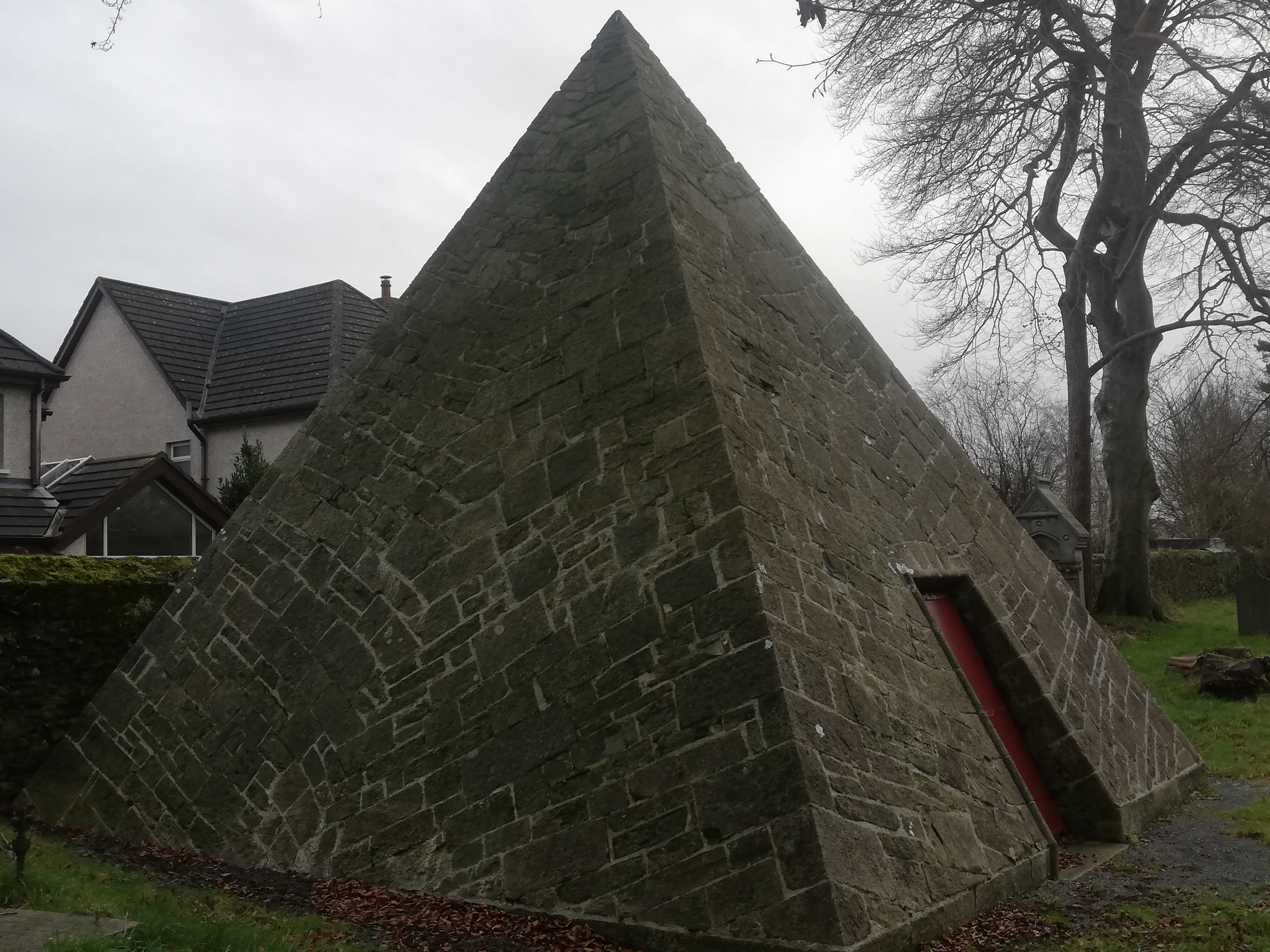
The east pyramid

The name is archaically spelled Maudlings; derives from Mary Magdalene, often depicted in art as mourning for Jesus after his crucifixion, and thus associated with burial grounds (cf. maudlin). At the time of the dissolution of the monasteries (c. 1540), Great Connell Priory was noted as possessing seven acres near to "the Maudelein of Naas." By 1606 the lands at Maudlings belonged to the chantry priests of St. David's Church, Naas.

The cemetery dates to a 1780 donation by John Bourke, 1st Earl of Mayo.

The west pyramid was built in honour of Anne de Burgh, wife of Walter Hussey Burgh, while the east pyramid is unmarked but believed to belong to another member of the De Burgh family.

The cemetery was expanded in 1889.

The Journal of the Co. Kildare Archaeological Society recorded in 1895 that grave-robbing took place at Maudlins, with the body of Moorehead, former governor of Naas Gaol, being one of the victims.

The two pyramids were restored in 2020 with €65,000 from the Follies Trust.

== Notable burials ==
- Earls of Mayo
  - Robert Bourke, 5th Earl of Mayo
- the Earls of Clonmell
- the De Burghs of Oldtown
  - Hubert de Burgh (1879–1960)
  - Eric de Burgh, general
- the De Robecks of Gowran Grange.
- Alexander Taylor (1746–1828), cartographer

== Gallery ==
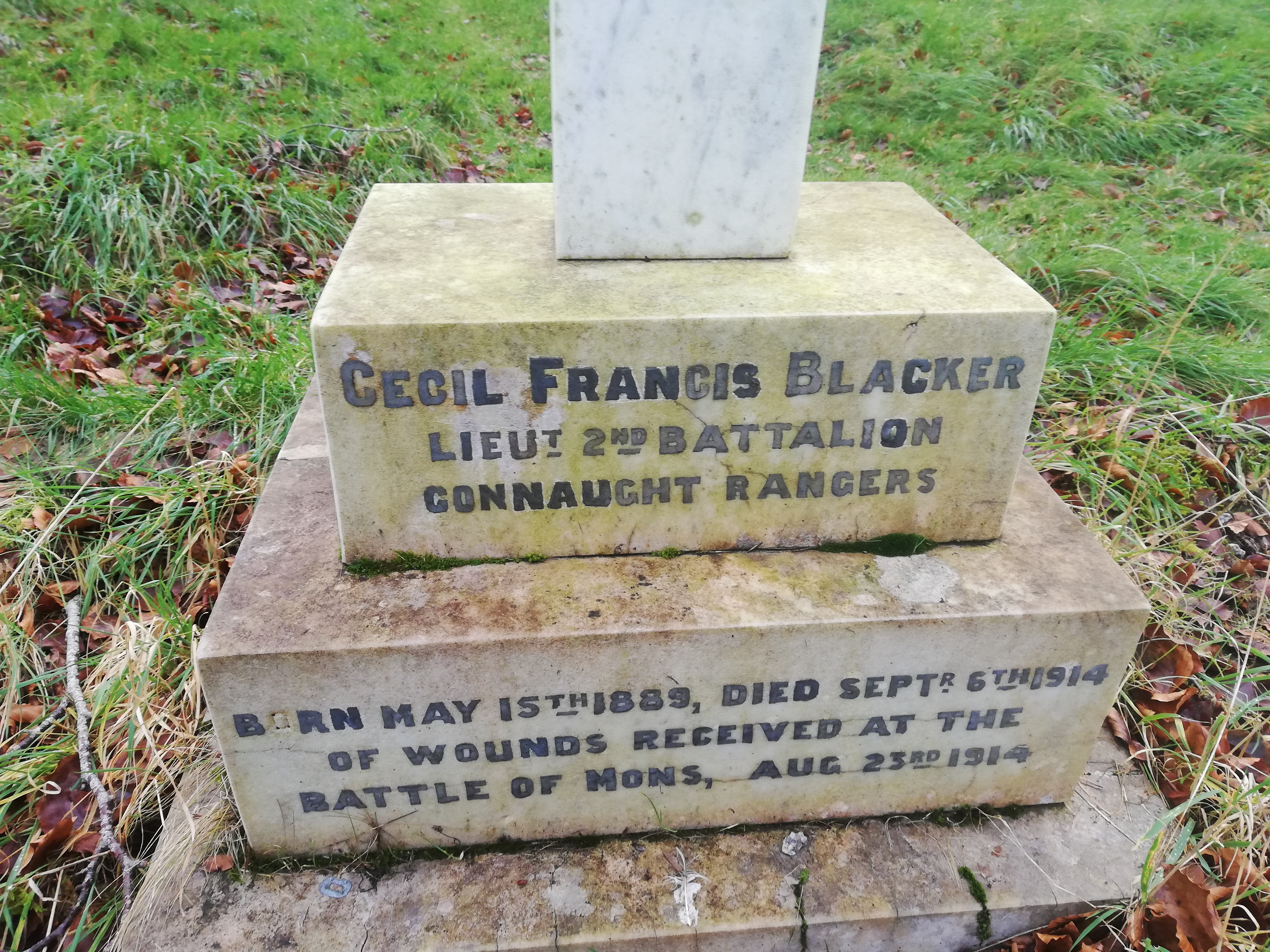
Grave of Lieut. C. F. Blacker, died of wounds received at the Battle of Mons, 1914

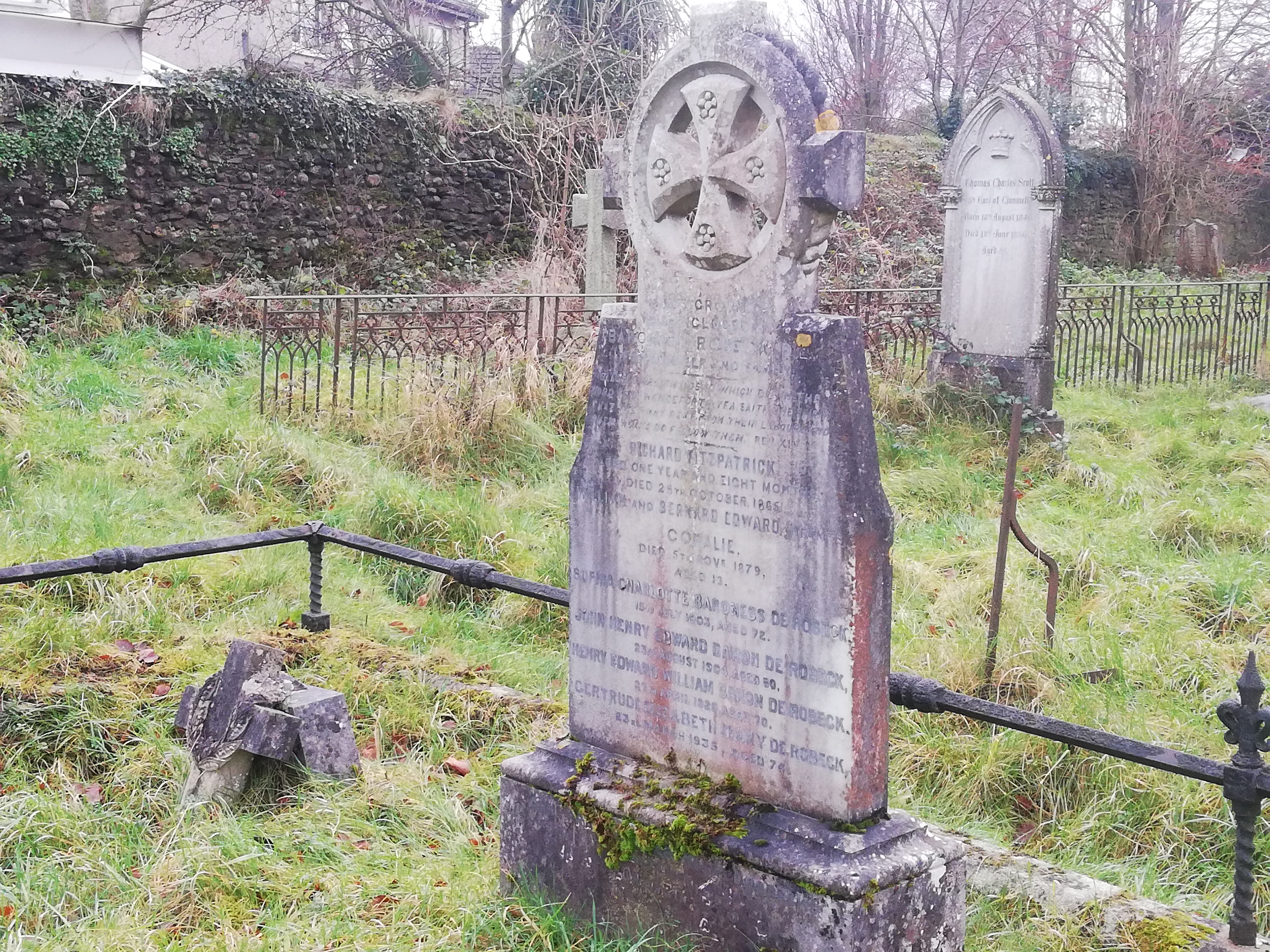
Gravestone of the De Robecks

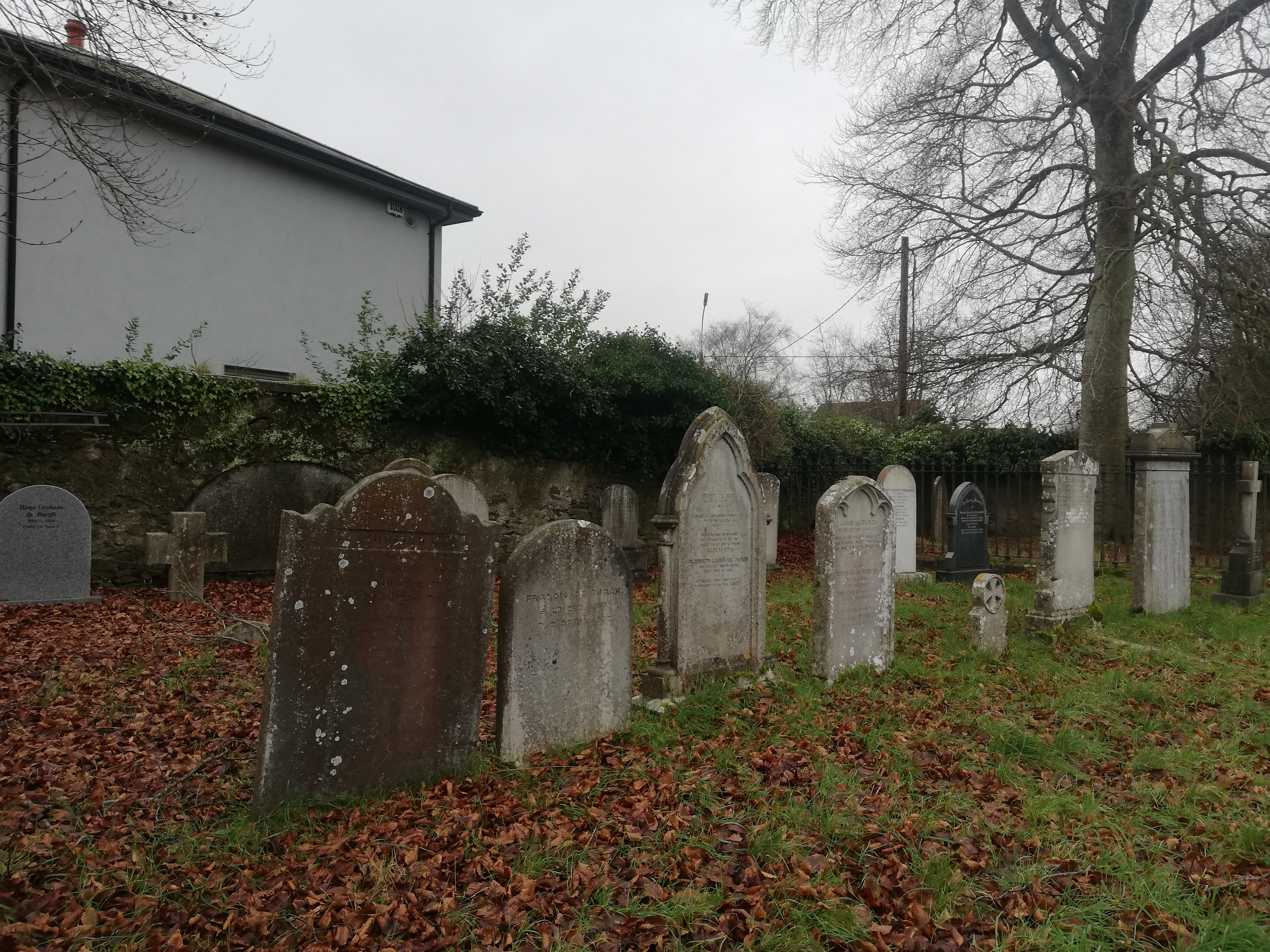
De Burgh plot
