= William Bartholomew (British Army officer) =

British Army general

General Sir William Bartholomew GCB CMG DSO
- Bartholomew in 1934
- Born: 16 March 1877; Wiltshire, England
- Died: 31 December 1962 (aged 85); Wiltshire, England
- Military career
- Allegiance: United Kingdom
- Branch: British Army
- Service years: 1897–1940
- Rank: General
- Nickname: "Barty"
- Unit: Royal Artillery
- Commands: Northern Command (1937–1940); Chief of the General Staff, India (1934–1937); Imperial Defence College (1929–1931); 6th Infantry Brigade (1923–1927)
- Conflicts: First World War; Second World War
- Awards: Knight Grand Cross of the Order of the Bath; Companion of the Order of St Michael and St George; Companion of the Distinguished Service Order; Mentioned in Despatches

General Sir William Henry Bartholomew, GCB, CMG, DSO (16 March 1877 – 31 December 1962) was a senior British Army officer during the 1930s and a Colonel Commandant of the Royal Artillery.

== Military career ==
Educated at Newton College, South Devon and the Royal Military Academy, Woolwich, Bartholomew was commissioned into the Royal Artillery on 23 March 1897. He was promoted to lieutenant on 23 March 1900, and to captain on 22 March 1902. After serving as an adjutant in July 1906, he attended the Staff College, Quetta from 1909 to 1910.

Bartholomew served in the First World War initially as a General Staff Officer in 4th Division, and then, on 20 December 1916, he received a temporary assignment to the War Office to serve there as a GSO1, remaining seconded from the RA whilst so employed. He was then a brigadier general on the General Staff of XX Corps from 1917 and on the General Staff of the Egyptian Expeditionary Force from 1918.

After the war Bartholomew commanded the 6th Infantry Brigade from 1923, was promoted in May 1926 to major general, moving on to be Director of Recruiting and Organisation at the War Office in 1927. He was appointed Commandant of the Imperial Defence College in 1929 and Director of Military Operations and Intelligence at the War Office in 1931. He became Chief of the General Staff in India in 1934 and then General Officer Commanding-in-Chief for Northern Command in 1937; he retired in 1940 during the Second World War.

Bartholomew was made an aide-de-camp general to the King from 1938 to 1940 and colonel commandant of the Royal Artillery from June 1934, when he succeeded Lieutenant General Sir Edward Fanshawe, to 1947.

== After the Army ==
In retirement, Bartholomew served as North Eastern Regional Commissioner for Civil Defence between 1940 and 1945. He lived at Claxton Hall near York. He donated over £20,000 in 1921 to the Public Dispensary and Hospital, Leeds; later becoming world-renowned St James' Teaching Hospital.

== Bibliography ==
- Smart, Nick (2005). Biographical Dictionary of British Generals of the Second World War. Barnesley: Pen & Sword. ISBN 1844150496.

Military offices
Preceded by Sir Herbert Richmond	Commandant of the Imperial Defence College; 1929–1931	Succeeded by Sir Robert Brooke-Popham
Preceded by Ronald Charles	Director of Military Operations and Intelligence; 1931–1934	Succeeded by John Dill
Preceded by Sir Kenneth Wigram	Chief of the General Staff (India); 1934–1937	Succeeded by Sir Ivo Vesey
Preceded by Sir Alexander Wardrop	GOC-in-C Northern Command; 1937–1940	Succeeded by Sir Ronald Adam
