= Charles Loyd =

British Army general (1891–1973)

General Sir Charles Loyd KCB KCVO DSO MC DL
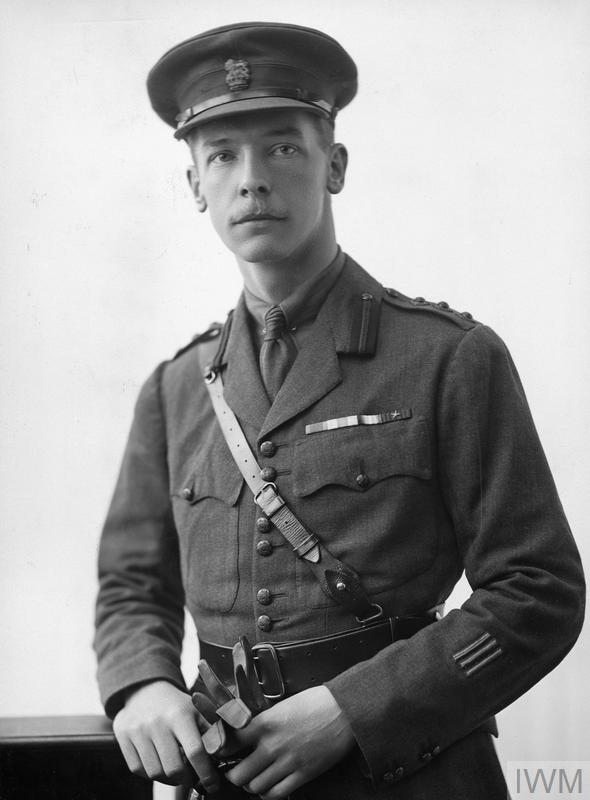
- Captain Loyd during the First World War
- Born: 12 February 1891; Hertfordshire
- Died: 11 November 1973 (aged 82); Mettingham, Suffolk, England
- Military career
- Allegiance: United Kingdom
- Branch: British Army
- Service years: 1910–1947
- Rank: General
- Nickname: "Budget Loyd"
- Service number: 17960
- Unit: Coldstream Guards
- Commands: London District (1944–1947); Southern Command (1942–1943); 2nd Infantry Division (1939–1940); 1st Guards Brigade (1938–1939); 3rd Battalion, Coldstream Guards (1929–1932); 2nd Battalion, Coldstream Guards (c. 1918)
- Conflicts: First World War; Second World War
- Awards: Knight Commander of the Royal Victorian Order; Knight Commander of the Order of the Bath; Companion of the Distinguished Service Order; Military Cross; Croix de guerre (France); Mentioned in Despatches (3)

General Sir Henry Charles Loyd, KCB, KCVO, DSO, MC, DL (12 February 1891 – 11 November 1973), nicknamed "Budget Loyd", was a senior British Army officer who fought in both the world wars, most notably during the Second World War as General Officer Commanding of the 2nd Infantry Division during the Battle of France in May 1940.

== Military career ==
Born on 12 February 1891 in Hertfordshire, the son of Edward Henry Loyd, Charles Loyd was educated at Eton and the Royal Military College, Sandhurst. He was commissioned as a second lieutenant into the Coldstream Guards on 3 September 1910. Another future general, Arthur Smith, was among his fellow graduates. He was nicknamed "Budget" because he joined the Coldstreamers in the year of David Lloyd George's People's Budget. He was promoted to lieutenant in April 1912.

Loyd served on the Western Front during the First World War with the 2nd Battalion, Coldstream Guards, then part of the 4th (Guards) Brigade of the 2nd Division. Promoted to captain in July 1915, he was wounded in action four times, thrice mentioned in despatches, including on 1 January 1918, appointed a Companion of the Distinguished Service Order, and awarded the Military Cross in 1915 and the French Croix de guerre. He was also, by war's end, a brevet lieutenant colonel and, as commanding officer of the 2nd Battalion, Coldstream Guards, one of the youngest battalion commanders in the British Army. The citation for his MC reads:

For conspicuous gallantry and ability on 8th October, 1915, near Loos. When his sap-heads and a large section of his front trench had been nearly levelled to the ground after a four hours' bombardment, his company repelled two determined bomb attacks, in both of which the Germans nearly gained a footing in our trenches. The great, personal bravery of Captain Loyd, his skilful organisation, and inspiriting example to those around him were largely instrumental in bringing about the success of his company.

After the war Loyd was selected for the first postwar course at the Staff College, Camberley, from 1919 to 1920. In 1922 he married Lady Moya Brodrick, the youngest daughter of the St John Brodrick, 1st Earl of Midleton; they had two children, a daughter, Lavinia Gertrude Georgiana, born on 21 December 1923, and a son, Julian St. John, born on 25 May 1926. In 1925 he returned to the Staff College, this time as an instructor, until 1926 when he was appointed commanding officer of the 3rd Battalion, Coldstream Guards. He was promoted on 1 January 1929 to brevet lieutenant colonel.

Loyd was promoted to regimental commander, commanding the Coldstream Guards regimental district, in 1932. In 1934, he became a staff officer at the War Office in London, moving on to be a brigadier on the General Staff of British Troops in Egypt in 1936. In December 1938, he was appointed commander of the 1st (Guards) Brigade, then part of the 1st Infantry Division. In June 1939, after only six months as a brigade commander, he was promoted to major general (with his seniority backdated to June 1938) and was appointed General Officer Commanding (GOC) of the 2nd Infantry Division, three months before the outbreak of the Second World War.

When the war did arrive Loyd's division, comprising the 4th, 5th and 6th Infantry Brigades and supporting units, was soon sent to France, where it formed part of Lieutenant General Sir John Dill's I Corps of the British Expeditionary Force (BEF). After being unengaged for the first eight months of the conflict, his division found itself heavily engaged in the Battle of France, which began on 10 May 1940, and the subsequent retreat to Dunkirk, which took part in the latter part of the month, where it was withdrawn to England in the Dunkirk evacuation. Loyd was not to see most of this, however, as on 16 May, while attending a conference, he suddenly fainted, the strain of the last few days having caused him to completely break down. He was evacuated to England, with command of the 2nd Division passing to Brigadier Noel Irwin, commander of the 6th Brigade.

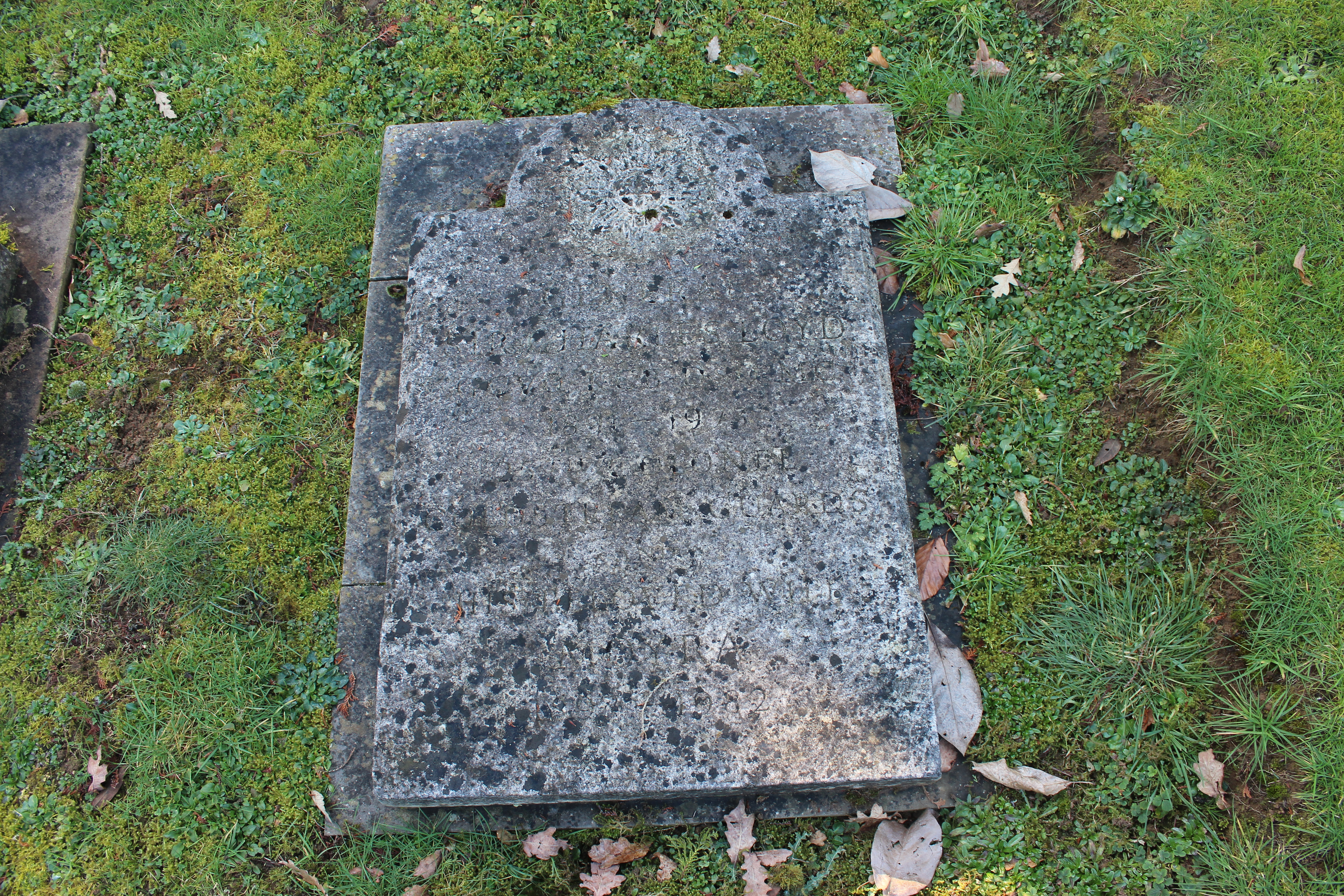
The grave of General Sir Charles Loyd in Peper Harow, Surrey.

Shortly afterwards, in June, Loyd succeeded Major General Henry Willcox as Director of Infantry at the War Office in London. This post was held until February 1941 when he was promoted to the acting rank of lieutenant general and became chief of staff to General Sir Alan Brooke, then the Commander-in-Chief, Home Forces, who had been a fellow student at the Staff College some twenty years earlier and who had long thought highly of "Budget" Loyd. He was to hold this post for just over a year before moving on to be General Officer Commanding-in-Chief Southern Command in March 1942. Knighted the following year, his last appointment was as Major-General commanding the Brigade of Guards and GOC London District in March 1944, a post which he held until he retired from the army, after the war, in 1947, after receiving a promotion to full general in 1946. He was appointed a Knight Commander of the Royal Victorian Order on 30 January 1947.

In retirement Loyd was a deputy lieutenant of Norfolk. He lived at Geldeston Hall in Norfolk. He was a justice of the peace for the county in 1954, and from 1945 to 1966 he served as Colonel of the Coldstream Guards.

== Bibliography ==
- French, David (2000). Raising Churchill's Army: The British Army and the War against Germany 1919–1945. Oxford University Press. ISBN 0-19-924630-0.
- Smart, Nick (2005). Biographical Dictionary of British Generals of the Second World War. Barnsley: Pen and Sword Books. ISBN 1844150496.

Military offices
Preceded by Henry Wilson	GOC 2nd Infantry Division; 1939–1940	Succeeded by Noel Irwin
Preceded by The Hon. Sir Harold Alexander	GOC-in-C Southern Command; 1942–1944	Succeeded by William Morgan
Preceded by Sir Arthur Smith	GOC London District; 1944–1947	Succeeded by Sir John Marriott
Honorary titles
Preceded by Sir Alfred Codrington	Colonel of the Coldstream Guards; 1945–1966	Succeeded by Sir George Burns
