= Arthur Smith (British Army officer) =

British Army General, born 1890

Lieutenant-General Sir Arthur Smith KCB KBE DSO MC
- Major-General Smith in 1942
- Born: 9 December 1890; London, England
- Died: 8 August 1977 (aged 86)
- Military career
- Allegiance: United Kingdom
- Branch: British Army
- Service years: 1910–1948
- Rank: Lieutenant-General
- Service number: 12914
- Unit: Coldstream Guards
- Commands: British Forces in India and Pakistan; Eastern Command, India; Persia and Iraq Command; Brigade of Guards; London District; 2nd Battalion, Coldstream Guards
- Conflicts: First World War; Second World War
- Awards: Knight Commander of the Order of the Bath; Knight Commander of the Order of the British Empire; Distinguished Service Order; Military Cross; Mentioned in Despatches (5); Order of Kutuzov, 2nd Class (USSR)
- Other work: Author of 100 Days Bible Study

Lieutenant-General Sir Arthur Francis Smith, KCB, KBE, DSO, MC (9 December 1890 – 8 August 1977) was a senior British Army officer who served during the Second World War.

== Military career ==
Smith attended the Royal Military College, Sandhurst, and was commissioned as a second lieutenant into the Coldstream Guards on 3 September 1910, alongside Charles Loyd, like Smith, a future general. He served in the First World War as an adjutant with the 3rd Battalion, Coldstream Guards on the Western Front from 1914 before becoming a General Staff Officer (GSO) in France in 1915.

During the interwar period Smith became a GSO at London District and then adjutant at the Royal Military College, Sandhurst, from 1921. It was during this time that he compiled the 100 Days Bible Study for cadet officers. He became commandant at the Guards Depot in 1924, and then moved back to London District as a GSO2 in April 1927. He was made commanding officer of the 2nd Battalion, Coldstream Guards in 1930 and then commander of the Coldstream Guards and Regimental District in 1934. In 1938 he became a brigadier on the General Staff of British Troops in Egypt.

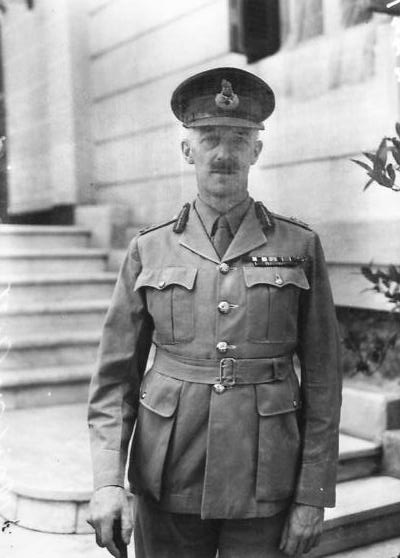
Arthur Smith, pictured here on 15 August 1940 as a major general.

Smith served in the Second World War initially as chief of staff, and with it came the acting rank of lieutenant general in April 1941, at Middle East Command until 1942 when he became Major-General commanding the Brigade of Guards and General Officer Commanding London District. He was appointed General Officer Commanding-in-Chief for Persia and Iraq Command in 1944, and awarded the Soviet Order of Kutuzov, 2nd Class.

After the war Smith was made General Officer Commanding-in-Chief for Eastern Command, India in 1945. He became Chief of the General Staff in India in 1946 and Commander of British Forces in India and Pakistan in 1947; he retired in 1948.

Smith was Lieutenant of the Tower of London from 1948 to 1951. He was a religious man who became Chairman of the British Evangelical Alliance and President of the World Evangelical Fellowship.

== Publications ==
While a captain with the Coldstream Guards, Smith was adjutant of the Royal Military College, Sandhurst, from 1921 to 1924. During that time he realised the need for a book to help Gentlemen Cadets understand their bibles. He therefore compiled 100 Days Bible Study, of which over 120,000 copies have been printed, and which has been translated in whole or in part into several different languages. It is still in print today.

== Bibliography ==
- Mead, Richard (2007). Churchill's Lions: a biographical guide to the key British generals of World War II. Stroud (UK): Spellmount. ISBN 978-1-86227-431-0.
- Smart, Nick (2005). Biographical Dictionary of British Generals of the Second World War. Barnesley: Pen & Sword. ISBN 1844150496.

Military offices
Preceded by Sir Bertram Sergison-Brooke	GOC London District; 1942–1944	Succeeded by Sir Charles Loyd
Preceded by Sir Richard O'Connor	GOC-in-C, Eastern Command, India; 1945–1946	Succeeded by Sir Francis Tuker
Preceded by Sir John Swayne	Chief of the General Staff (India); 1946–1947	Succeeded by K.M. Cariappa
