= George Kirkpatrick (British Army officer) =

Canadian soldier

General Sir George Kirkpatrick KCB KCSI
- Born: George Macaulay Kirkpatrick; 23 August 1866; Kingston, Ontario
- Died: 6 February 1950 (aged 83); London, England
- Military career
- Allegiance: United Kingdom
- Branch: British Army
- Service years: 1885–1930
- Rank: General
- Commands: British Forces in China; Western Command, India
- Awards: Knight Commander of the Order of the Bath; Knight Commander of the Order of the Star of India; CB

General Sir George Macaulay Kirkpatrick KCB KCSI (23 August 1866 – 6 February 1950) was a Canadian soldier who served with the British Army in South Africa, Canada, India, Australia, and China. He became one of only a handful of Canadians to reach the rank of full general, the others being William Heneker, Charles Loewen, and....

== Education ==
Kirkpatrick was born on 23 August 1866 to the politician Sir George Airey Kirkpatrick (1841–1899) and Frances June Macaulay of Kingston, Ontario. He was educated at Trinity College School in Port Hope, Ontario and at the Haileybury and Imperial Service College in London. He returned to Ontario to attend the Royal Military College of Canada in Kingston from 1882 to 1885. As a surveyor in 1892, he authored topographic maps of the Town and environs of the Fez Region of Morocco.

== Military service ==
Kirkpatrick was commissioned into the Royal Engineers as a lieutenant on 30 June 1885. He was appointed aide-de-camp to the General Officer Commanding, Thames District in 1892, and promoted to captain on 12 December 1894. He attended the Staff College, Camberley, from 1895–1896.

He was deployed as Deputy Assistant Adjutant General (Intelligence) during the Second Boer War, and received the brevet rank of major on 29 November 1900.

Following the end of the war in May 1902, he left Cape Town on the SS Canada and returned to Southampton in late July. He received the brevet rank of lieutenant colonel on 22 August 1902, and the substantive rank of major on 17 January 1903; and served in Halifax, Nova Scotia, as Deputy Assistant Quartermaster General for Intelligence from September 1902. On 21 November 1904 he succeeded Charles Edward Callwell as a deputy assistant quartermaster general at the War Office. He went on to be Assistant Quartermaster General at Headquarters, India in 1906, where he was promoted in October 1906 to brevet lieutenant colonel,

He was promoted to colonel on 7 May 1910 and became inspector general of the Military Forces of Australia on 8 May, for which he was granted the temporary rank of major general whilst employed in this role. He held this post for the next four years, until 8 May 1914, and, after relinquishing his temporary major general's rank and reverting to his substantive colonel's rank, was placed on half-pay.

He served in World War I as Director of Military Operations in India from 1914 to 1916, during which time he was promoted to the permanent rank of major general in June 1915 "for distinguished service in the Field", when he became Chief of the General Staff in India.

He subsequently served as Commander of British Forces in China from 1921 to 1922 and General Officer Commanding-in-Chief, Western Command, India, from June 1923 to 1927. He retired from the army in June 1930. He had been promoted to lieutenant general in August 1921.

== Honours ==
Kirkpatrick was twice mentioned in despatches in 1902. He was appointed a Companion of the Order of the Bath (CB) in the 1911 Birthday Honours. He was knighted as a Knight Commander of the Order of the Star of India (KCSI) in 1917 and a Knight Commander of the Order of the Bath (KCB) in 1918.

== Family ==
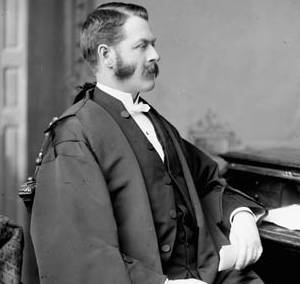
George Airey Kirkpatrick

In 1896, Kirkpatrick married artist Mary Lydia Dennistoun (1870-1945). They had three daughters, Georgina Helen (born 1898) mother of Iain Tennant. Kathleen Mary (born 1899) in Malta, and Margaret Charlotte (born 1904) in Canada.

== Sources ==
- 4237 Dr. Adrian Preston & Peter Dennis (Edited) "Swords and Covenants" Rowman And Littlefield, London. Croom Helm. 1976.
- H16511 Dr. Richard Arthur Preston "To Serve Canada: A History of the Royal Military College of Canada" 1997 Toronto, University of Toronto Press, 1969.
- H16511 Dr. Richard Arthur Preston "Canada's RMC – A History of Royal Military College" Second Edition 1982
- H1877 R. Guy C. Smith (editor) "As You Were! Ex-Cadets Remember". In 2 Volumes. Volume I: 1876–1918. Volume II: 1919–1984. Royal Military College. [Kingston]. The R.M.C. Club of Canada. 1984

Military offices
Preceded by Sir Percy Lake	Chief of the General Staff; 1916–1920	Succeeded by Sir Claud Jacob
Preceded by Francis Ventris	Commander of British Forces in China; 1921–1922	Succeeded by Sir John Fowler
Preceded by Sir Walter Braithwaite	GOC-in-C, Western Command, India; 1923–1927	Succeeded by Sir Charles Harington
