= Isabel Emslie Hutton =

Scottish physician (1887–1960)

Isabel Emslie Hutton Lady Hutton CBE
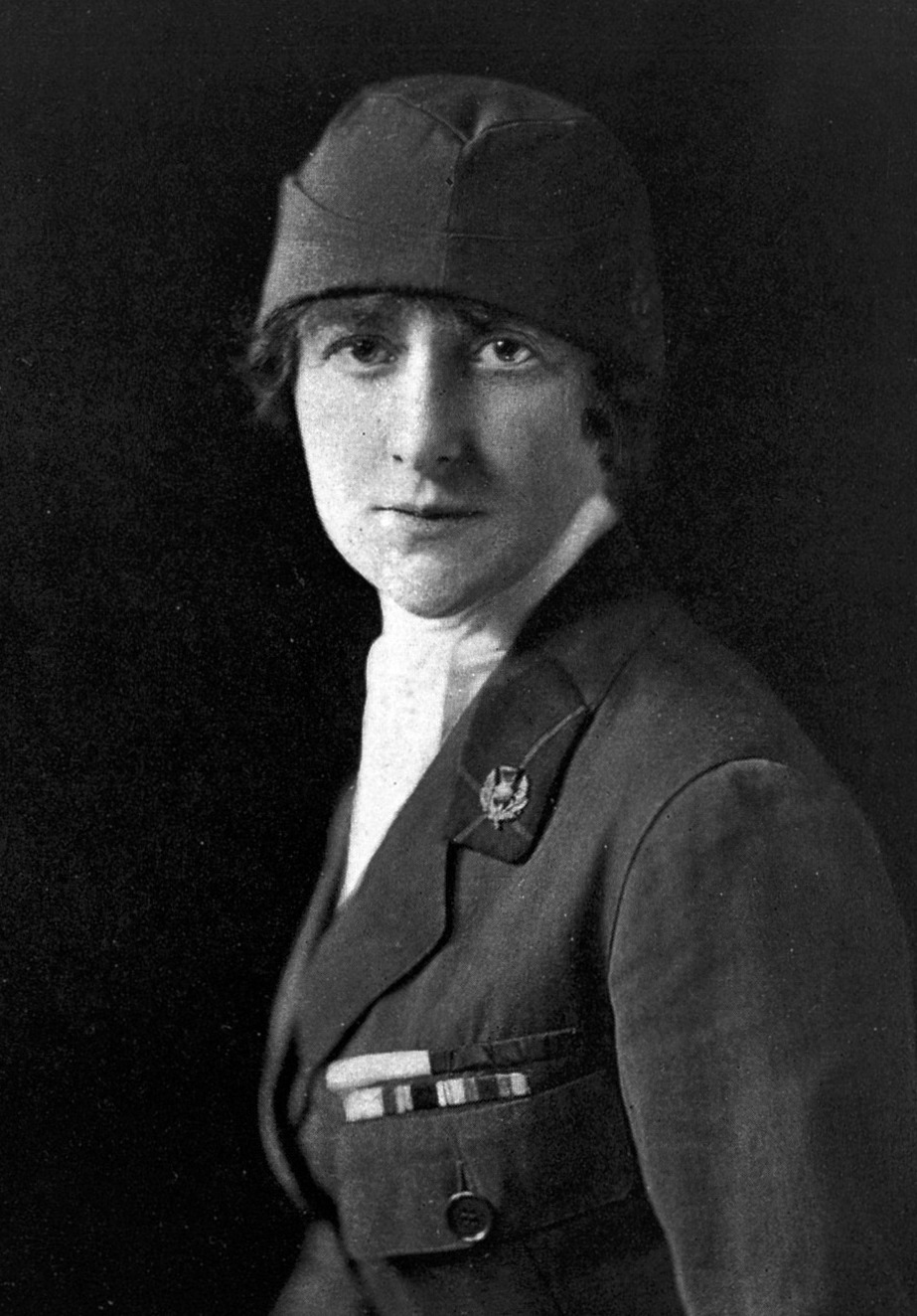
- Isabel Galloway Emslie Hutton
- Born: Isabel Galloway Emslie; 11 September 1887; Edinburgh, Scotland
- Died: 11 January 1960 (aged 72); London, England
- Education: University of Edinburgh
- Known for: Medical work during World War I Order of the White Eagle (Serbia); Order of St. Sava; Croix de Guerre; Order of St. Anna; Serbian postage stamp in her honour (2015)
- Relatives: General Sir Thomas Hutton (married 1921)
- Medical career
- Profession: Physician, pathologist
- Field: psychiatry
- Institutions: Royal Edinburgh Hospital
- Notable works: Wassermann sero-diagnosis of syphilis in 200 cases of insanity With a Woman's Unit in Serbia, Salonika and Sebastopol; Mental Disorders in Modern Life; Memoirs of a Doctor in War and Peace

Dr Isabel Galloway Emslie MD, Lady Hutton CBE (11 September 1887 – 11 January 1960) was a Scottish physician who specialised in mental health and social work.

She served leading units in Dr Elsie Inglis's Scottish Women's Hospitals for Foreign Service in the front line in World War I and won awards from the British, Serbian, Russian and French. Emslie married British military officer Lt General Sir Thomas Jacomb Hutton.

== Early life and education ==
Isabel Galloway Emslie was born in Edinburgh in 1887. She was the eldest daughter of James Emslie, advocate and Deputy Keeper of the Privy Seal of Scotland. She was educated at Edinburgh Ladies' College, then enrolled at the University of Edinburgh, where she trained in the women's medical school, spending her hospital residence years at the Edinburgh Royal Infirmary. In 1910, she graduated with a degree in medicine and in 1912 was awarded her MD degrees with a thesis titled "Wassermann sero-diagnosis of syphilis in 200 cases of insanity".

== Career ==
While completing her thesis, Emslie worked as a pathologist at the Stirling District Asylum, then moved to the Royal Hospital for Sick Children before becoming the first woman to be appointed in charge of the women's medicine of the Royal Edinburgh Hospital.

In 1915, she joined the Scottish Women's Hospitals Organisation and served in France at the Domaine de Chanteloup, Sainte-Savine, near Troyes, then with the French Army’s Armee d'Orient in Salonika, distinguishing herself by leading the unit which accompanied the Serbian army during the First World War.

Following the closure of the Serbian hospital where she worked, Emslie took over Lady Muriel Paget's mission in Crimea. In this role, she brought several orphaned children to Constantinople (now Istanbul) and organised relief for Russian refugees. In 1928, she published With a Woman's Unit in Serbia, Salonika and Sebastopol, an account of these years.

For her work during this period, she was awarded the Serbian orders of the White Eagle and St. Sava, the French Croix de Guerre, and the Order of St. Anna of Russia.

On her return to Edinburgh in 1920, she was reinstated to her former post at the Royal Edinburgh Hospital but resigned the position after her marriage the following year to Major Thomas Hutton. She then moved to London, working as a researcher the Maudsley Hospital which led to a research paper with Sir Frederick Mott, and honorary consultancies at the Maudsley and the West End Hospital for Nervous Disease. In October 1939, she was living in Marylebone and was registered as a consultant physician. In 1940, she published Mental Disorders in Modern Life, drawing on her experience from these roles.

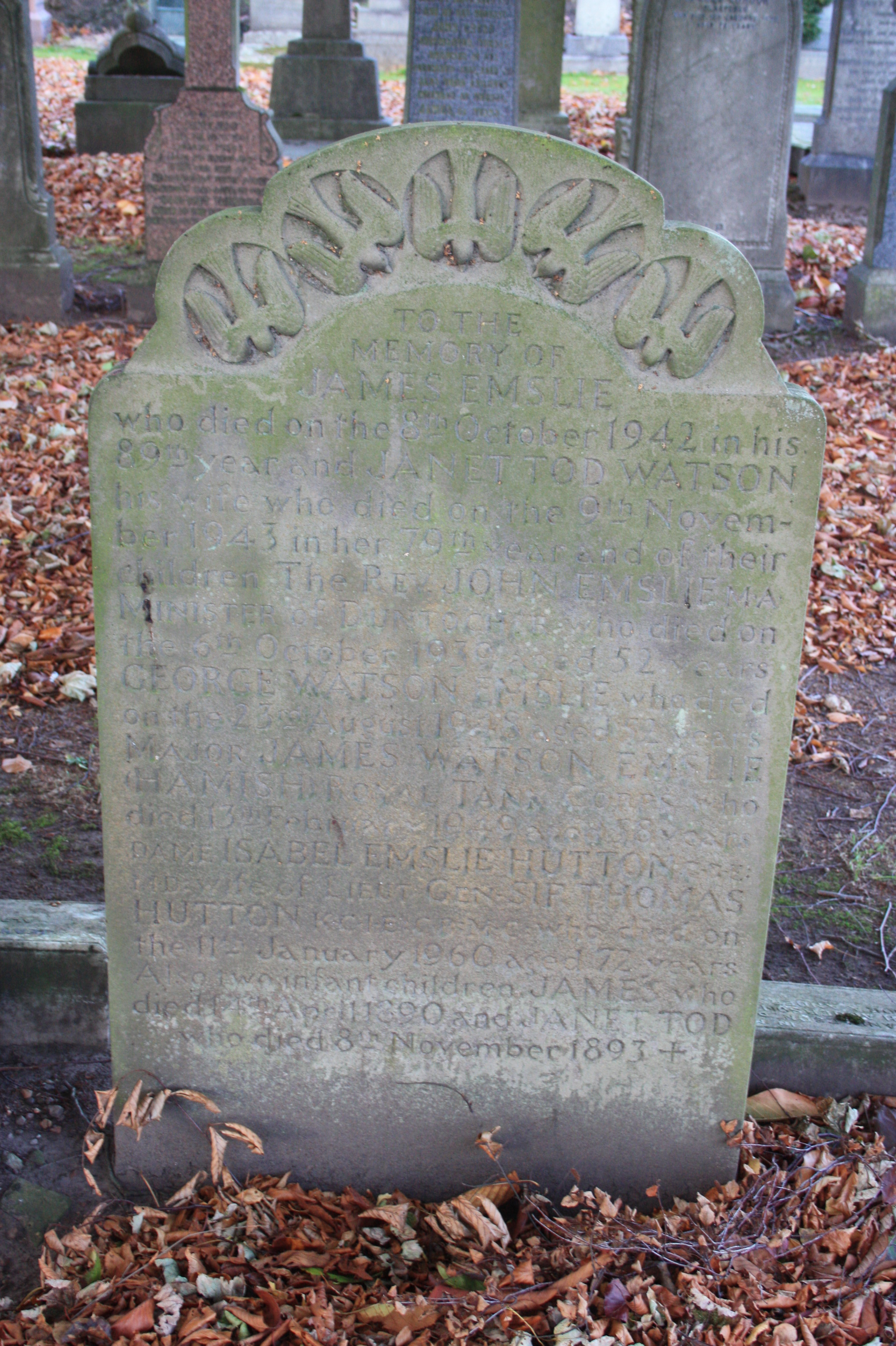
The grave of Isabel Emslie Hutton, Grange Cemetery

During the Second World War, she joined her husband in India and took up the post of director of the Indian Red Cross welfare service, also undertaking charity work, broadcasting, and dispatches for the external affairs department. She returned to England in 1946. In 1948, she was appointed as a Commander of the Order of the British Empire.

Becoming a senior consultant, Hutton was elected a Fellow of the Royal Society of Medicine and a member of the Royal Medico-Psychological Association.

She died on 11 January 1960 at her home in London. She was buried with her parents in the Grange Cemetery in south Edinburgh. Her gravestone, sculpted by Pilkington Jackson, stands near the centre of the south-west extension.

== Selected works ==
- With a Woman's Unit in Serbia, Salonika and Sebastopol, 1928
- Mental Disorders in Modern Life, 1940
- autobiography, Memoirs of a Doctor in War and Peace, 1960.

== Awards and honours ==
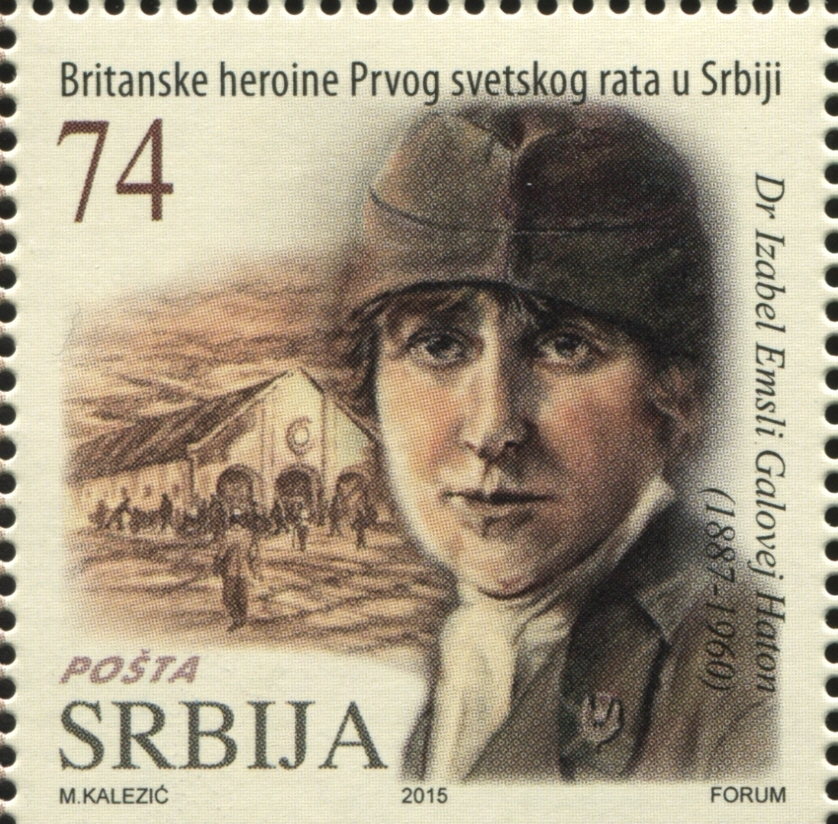
Hutton on a 2015 stamp of Serbia from the series "British Heroines of the First World War in Serbia".

- In 2015, a Serbian postage stamp was released to honour her work during the war.
- Serbian orders of the White Eagle and St. Sava
- French Croix de Guerre
- Order of St. Anna of Russia
- 1948, CBE
- in the city of Vranje, Serbia the località Medicine High School brings her name in her honour.

== See also ==
- People on Scottish banknotes
- Elsie Inglis Memorial Maternity Hospital
- Scottish Women's Hospitals for Foreign Service
- Eveline Haverfield – British suffragette and aid worker (1867–1920)
- Elizabeth Ness MacBean Ross – Scottish physician (1878 - 1915)
- Leila Paget – British humanitarian (1881–1958)
- Mabel St Clair Stobart – British suffragist and aid-worker
- Josephine Bedford – Australian philanthropist and WWI ambulance driver (1861-1955)
- Katherine Harley – British suffragist
- Elsie Inglis – Scottish doctor (1864–1917)
