= Eric de Burgh =

British Army general

General Sir Eric de Burgh KCB DSO OBE
- Born: 10 May 1881; Naas, County Kildare, Ireland
- Died: 6 February 1973 (aged 91); Wexford, County Wexford, Ireland
- Burial place: Maudlin's Cemetery
- Spouse: Mary Fanshawe (m. 1923; died 1934)
- Military career
- Allegiance: United Kingdom
- Branch: British Army; British Indian Army
- Service years: 1901–1941
- Rank: General
- Service number: 3737
- Commands: Chief of the General Staff in India; 1st Indian Division; Rawalpindi District; Lahore District; 1st (Risalpur) Cavalry Brigade
- Conflicts: Second Boer War; First World War; Third Anglo-Afghan War; Second World War
- Awards: Knight Commander of the Order of the Bath; Distinguished Service Order; Officer of the Order of the British Empire

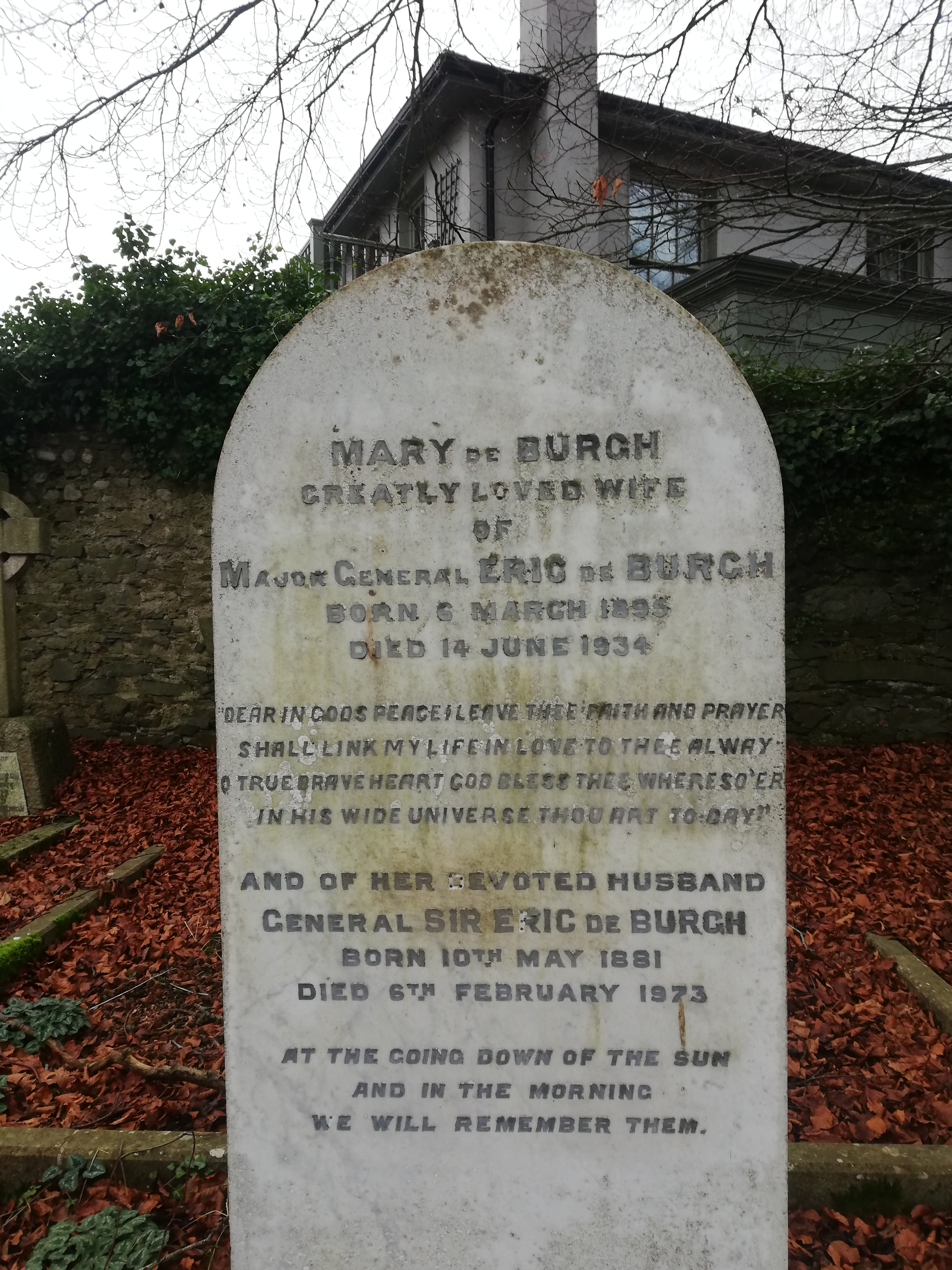
Tombstone of General de Burgh and his wife, Maudlin's Cemetery

General Sir Eric de Burgh, KCB, DSO, OBE (English: /d ˈbɜːr/; d’-BER; 10 May 1881 – 6 February 1973) was a British Indian Army officer who served as Chief of the General Staff in India from 1939 to 1941.

== Military career ==
Educated at Marlborough College and the Colonial College, Hollesley Bay, De Burgh was commissioned into the 3rd (Militia) Battalion, Royal Dublin Fusiliers, as a second lieutenant in October 1901. In February 1902 he was seconded for service with mounted infantry during the Second Boer War, with the local rank of lieutenant whilst serving in South Africa. After the end of the war in South Africa, he was in January 1903 transferred to the regular army, where he was commissioned a second lieutenant in the Manchester Regiment. He was seconded to the Indian Army later the same year, and served in the 19th Lancers (Fane's Horse). He attended the Staff College, Camberley from 1913 to 1914.

De Burgh served in the First World War and saw action at the Battle of Neuve Chapelle in March 1915, the month he was made a brigade major, the Second Battle of Ypres in April 1915 and the Battle of Loos in September 1915. He later saw action at the Battle of the Somme in 1916, the Battle of Arras in April 1917 and the Battle of Cambrai in November 1917.

De Burgh also fought in the Third Anglo-Afghan War in 1919. He was appointed an instructor at Staff College, Quetta in 1928. He went on to be a Brigadier on the General Staff at Eastern Command in India in 1930, commanding officer of the 1st (Risalpur) Cavalry Brigade in 1931 and District Officer Commanding Lahore District in 1934. After that he attended the Imperial Defence College. He then became Deputy Chief General Staff at Army Headquarters India in 1935, District Officer Commanding Rawalpindi District in 1936 and General Officer Commanding 1st Indian Division in 1937. His last appointment was as Chief of the General Staff in India in 1939 at the start of the Second World War before retiring in 1941.

In retirement, De Burgh lived at Ard Cairn outside Naas and, in 1960, he acquired Bargy Castle in County Wexford.

== Family ==
In 1923, De Burgh married Mary Fanshawe, daughter of General Sir Edward Fanshawe; they had two daughters. He was the maternal grandfather of singer Chris de Burgh.

== Bibliography ==
- Smart, Nick (2005). Biographical Dictionary of British Generals of the Second World War. Barnesley: Pen & Sword. ISBN 1844150496.

Military offices
Preceded by Sir Ivo Vesey	Chief of the General Staff (India); 1939–1941	Succeeded by Sir Thomas Hutton
