= Chief of the General Staff (India) =

Senior military commander in the British Indian Army

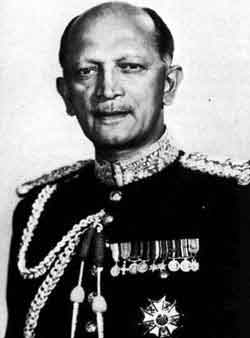
- First Indian in office Major General K. M. Cariappa; August 1947—November 1947
- British Indian Army; Indian Army
- Abbreviation: CGS
- Reports to: Commander-in-Chief, India
- Seat: GHQ India
- Term length: No fixed term
- Formation: March 1906
- First holder: Lieutenant general Sir Beauchamp Duff (British Indian Army)
- Final holder: Lieutenant General Moti Sagar (Indian Army)
- Abolished: January 1965
- Succession: Vice Chief of the Army Staff in 1965

The Chief of the General Staff, India was a senior military commander in the British Indian Army from 1906 to 1947, and in the independent Indian Army from 1947 until 1965.

== History ==
During British rule, the Chief of the General Staff, India assisted the Commander-in-Chief, India in commanding the British Indian Army. The post was largely honorary as all power resided in the hands of Commander-in-Chief, India. After Indian independence in 1947, the CGS remained a senior staff appointment. In January 1959, the appointment of Deputy Chief of the Army Staff (DCOAS) was established as the deputy commander of the Indian Army until it was superseded by the new post of Vice Chief of the Army Staff (VCOAS) In January 1965. Subsequently, the post of VCOAS replaced the CGS.

== Chief of the General Staff ==
Holders of the post have been:

=== British Indian Army (1906–1947) ===
No.	Name	Took office	Left office	Unit of commission	Ref
1	Lieutenant-General Sir Beauchamp Duff	Mar 1906	Oct 1909	Royal Artillery	
2	Lieutenant-General Sir Douglas Haig	Oct 1909	Feb 1912	7th Queen's Own Hussars	
3	Lieutenant-General Sir Percy Lake	Feb 1912	Jan 1916	59th (2nd Nottinghamshire) Regiment of Foot	
4	Lieutenant-General Sir George Kirkpatrick	Jan 1916	Jan 1920	Royal Engineers	
5	General Sir Claud Jacob	Jan 1920	Nov 1924	Worcestershire Regiment	
6	General Sir Andrew Skeen	Nov 1924	Oct 1928	King's Own Scottish Borderers	
7	General Sir Philip Chetwode	Oct 1928	Jul 1930	Oxfordshire and Buckinghamshire Light Infantry	
8	Lieutenant-General Sir Cyril Deverell	Jul 1930	Mar 1931	Prince of Wales's West Yorkshire Regiment	
9	General Sir Kenneth Wigram	Mar 1931	May 1934	2nd King Edward VII's Own Gurkha Rifles (The Sirmoor Rifles)	
10	General Sir William Bartholomew	May 1934	Oct 1937	Royal Artillery	
11	General Sir Ivo Vesey	Oct 1937	Jun 1939	Queen's Royal Regiment (West Surrey)	
12	General Sir Eric de Burgh	Jun 1939	May 1941	Royal Dublin Fusiliers	
13	Lieutenant-General Sir Thomas Hutton	May 1941	Dec 1941	Royal Artillery	
14	Lieutenant-General Sir Edwin Morris	Dec 1941	Apr 1944	Royal Engineers	
15	Lieutenant-General Sir John Swayne	Apr 1944	Jan 1946	Somerset Light Infantry	
16	Lieutenant-General Sir Arthur Smith	Jan 1946	Aug 1947	Coldstream Guards	

=== Indian Army (1947–1965) ===
S.No	Name	Regiment of commission	Assumed office	Left office	References	Notes
1	Major General K. M. Cariappa OBE	Rajput Regiment	August 1947	November 1947		Later became first Indian Commander-in-Chief of the Indian Army.
	Major General Pran Nath Thapar	1st Punjab Regiment	December 1947	February 1948		Officiating Chief of the General Staff. Later served as Chief of the Army Staff.
	Major General Jayanto Nath Chaudhuri OBE	7th Light Cavalry	February 1948	May 1948		Officiating. Later served as Chief of the Army Staff.
2	Major General Kalwant Singh	1st Punjab Regiment	8 May 1948	March 1950		Later served as General Officer Commanding-in-Chief Western Command.
3	Major General S. P. P. Thorat KC, DSO	14th Punjab Regiment	3 April 1950	January 1953		Later served as General Officer Commanding-in-Chief Eastern Command.
4	Major General Jayanto Nath Chaudhuri OBE	7th Light Cavalry	29 September 1953	December 1955		Later served as Chief of the Army Staff.
5	Major General Mohinder Singh Wadalia	Kumaon Regiment	10 December 1955	May 1957		
6	Lieutenant General Shiv Dev Verma	16th Light Cavalry	8 May 1957 (Note: Promoted to Lieutenant General in 1958.)	February 1959		
7	Lieutenant General Lionel Protip Sen DSO	Baloch Regiment	9 February 1959	8 May 1961		Later served as General Officer Commanding-in-Chief Eastern Command.
8	Lieutenant General Brij Mohan Kaul PVSM	Rajputana Rifles	8 May 1961	4 October 1962		
9	Lieutenant General Moti Sagar	4th Gorkha Rifles	11 November 1962	15 January 1965		

== See also ==
- Commander-in-Chief of India
- Deputy Chief of the Army Staff
