= Thomas Hutton =

British Army general (1890–1981)

Lieutenant-General Sir Thomas Hutton KCIE CB MC & Bar
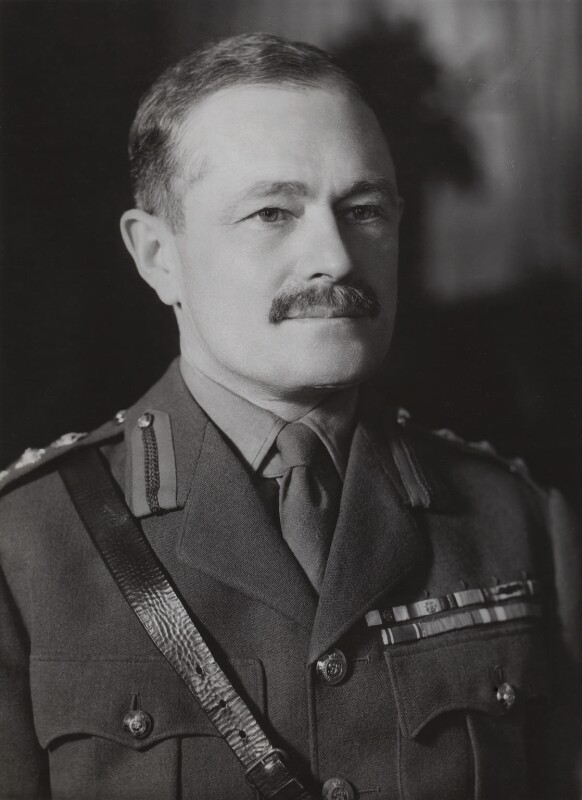
- Hutton in 1938
- Born: 27 March 1890; Nottingham, Nottinghamshire, England
- Died: 17 January 1981 (aged 90); London, England
- Spouse: Isabel Emslie Hutton (m. 1921–1960)
- Military career
- Allegiance: United Kingdom
- Branch: British Army
- Service years: 1909–1944
- Rank: Lieutenant-General
- Service number: 19400
- Units: Royal Field Artillery; Royal Artillery
- Commands: Burma Command (1941–1942); Chief of the General Staff, India (1941); Western Independent District (1938–1940)
- Conflicts: First World War; Arab revolt in Palestine; Second World War
- Awards: Knight Commander of the Order of the Indian Empire; Companion of the Order of the Bath; Military Cross & Bar; Mentioned in Despatches (5); Legion of Honour (France); Croix de Guerre (France); War Merit Cross (Italy)

Lieutenant-General Sir Thomas Jacomb Hutton, KCIE, CB, MC & Bar (27 March 1890 – 17 January 1981) was a British Army officer who held a variety of vital staff appointments between the First and Second World Wars, ultimately commanding the Burma Army during the early stages of the Japanese conquest of Burma in early 1942.

Hutton was married to Scottish psychiatrist Isabel Emslie Hutton.

== Early life and First World War ==
Thomas Jacomb Hutton was born on 27 March 1890 in Nottingham, Nottinghamshire, the eldest son of William Henry Hutton. He was educated at Rossall School and the Royal Military Academy, Woolwich. On 23 December 1909, after passing out from Woolwich, he was commissioned as a second lieutenant into the Royal Field Artillery. Promoted on 23 December 1912 to lieutenant, Hutton served with the RFA on the Western Front throughout the First World War, being promoted to captain in 1915 and brevet major in 1918. He became staff qualified, and served in 1918 as a General Staff Officer Grade 3 (GSO3) and as a brigade major from 1918 to 1919.

== Between the wars ==
From 1919 to 1920, Hutton served in the War Office as the Assistant Military Secretary and from 1923 to 1924 as the Deputy Assistant Adjutant General. He met Scottish psychiatrist Isabel Galloway Emslie in Constantinople and they married in 1921.

After attending the Staff College, Camberley, as a student from 1922 to 1923, Hutton was a General Staff Officer Grade 2 (GSO2) on the staff of Eastern Command from 1924 to 1926, in the eastern counties of Britain. He was promoted to the substantive rank of major in 1927, and from 1927 to 1930 he was the Military Assistant to the Chief of the Imperial General Staff (CIGS) and later attended the Imperial Defence College. He was "double jumped" to the rank of full colonel in 1930 and served from 1933 to 1936 as General Staff Officer Grade 1 (GSO1) in the Directorate of Military Operations in the War Office.

In 1936, Hutton served in the British forces in Palestine during the Arab revolt. From 1936 to 1938 he was the GSO1 (Chief of Staff) in the 1st Infantry Division, which was sent to Palestine. He was promoted to major-general and appointed General Officer Commanding (GOC) Western Independent District, in India in 1938.

== Second World War ==
In 1940, after the outbreak of the Second World War, Hutton was appointed Deputy Chief of the General Staff, GHQ India. The following year he was promoted lieutenant-general and became Chief of the General Staff at GHQ India.

=== Burma Army ===
In 1942, Hutton was appointed General Officer Commanding Burma Command, which was facing imminent invasion by Japanese troops. Burma Army was subordinated to the American-British-Dutch-Australian Command, of which Archibald Wavell was Commander in Chief.

Hutton initially ordered his subordinates to fight as close to the borders as possible. Some of them thought that he was doing so on Wavell's orders, but Hutton actually wished to gain time for reinforcements to arrive. This resulted in the defeat of the ill-equipped and badly-trained Burmese and Indian formations that tried to fight close to the frontier.

Hutton now considered that Rangoon, the capital, could not be defended. He attempted to divert reinforcements to ports further north. Wavell considered this to be defeatism, and stormed at Hutton in front of witnesses at a meeting on 28 February. He did not argue back, feeling that a dignified silence was the best rebuke. Hutton had already been superseded by General Harold Alexander as GOC of Burma Army, and appointed Alexander's Chief of Staff, an embarrassing appointment he held until Burma Army was disbanded later in the year.

During the crisis in Burma in 1942, it was felt by some senior officers (such as General Sir Alan Hartley, the acting Commander in Chief in India), that Hutton made a good chief of staff but was not fitted for command in the field. Hutton subsequently served until 1944 as Secretary of the War Resources and Reconstruction Committees of Council, India. In 1944, he retired from the army.

== Later career ==
Hutton held a variety of Civil Posts after his retirement: from 1944 to 1946, he was Officiating Secretary, Viceroy's Executive Council in India.

Military offices
Preceded by Sir Eric de Burgh	Chief of the General Staff, India; May–December 1941	Succeeded by Sir Edwin Morris
Preceded by Kenneth McLeod	Burma Command; 1941–1942	Succeeded by Sir Harold Alexander
