= Percy Lake =

General in British Army and Canadian Militia

Lieutenant-General Sir Percy Lake KCB KCMG
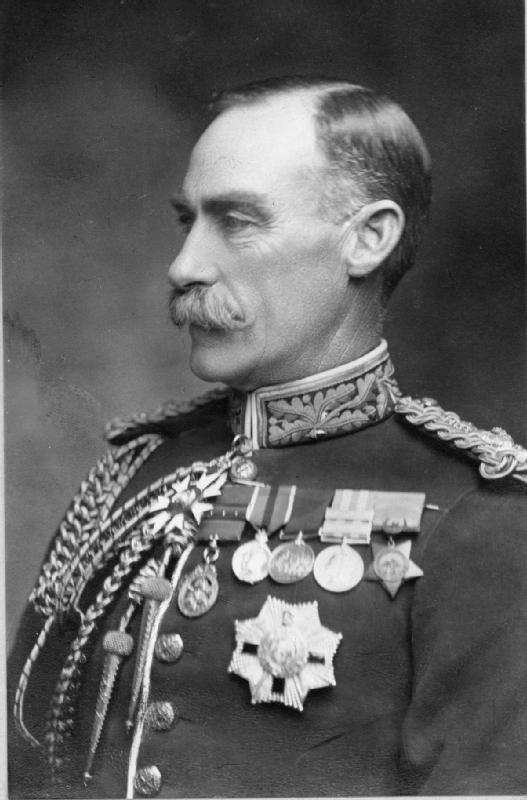
- Born: 29 June 1855; Tenby, Wales
- Died: 17 November 1940 (aged 85); Victoria, British Columbia, Canada
- Relatives: Richard Stuart Lake (brother)
- Military career
- Allegiance: United Kingdom / British Empire
- Branch: British Army / Indian Army / Canadian Militia
- Service years: 1873–1919
- Rank: Lieutenant-General
- Commands: Chief of the General Staff, Canada; 1st (Peshawar) Division; Chief of the General Staff, India; Mesopotamian campaign
- Conflicts: Second Anglo-Afghan War; Suakin Expedition; World War I
- Awards: Knight Commander of the Order of the Bath; Knight Commander of the Order of St Michael and St George

Lieutenant-General Sir Percy Henry Noel Lake, KCB, KCMG (29 June 1855 – 17 November 1940) served as a senior commander in the British and Indian Armies, and in the Canadian Militia. He served during World War I.

== Military career ==
Lake was the son of Lt.-Colonel Percy Godfrey Botfield Lake (1829–1899) and his wife Margaret Phillips of Quebec City. Born at Tenby, Wales, on 29 June 1855, he was brought up in Preston, Lancashire, where his father was stationed. He was educated at Preston Grammar School and Uppingham School.

Lake was commissioned as a sub-lieutenant in the 59th Regiment of Foot in 1873, and promoted to lieutenant on 9 August 1873. He fought in the Second Anglo-Afghan War in 1878–79.

In February 1881 he was promoted to captain and in June he was made an inspector of musketry although he resigned this appointment in February 1883. He graduated from the Staff College, Camberley, in 1884. In 1885 he became Deputy Assistant Adjutant General and Quartermaster General during the Suakin Expedition, Sudan.

Returning home, he served as a staff captain at Army Headquarters in 1887 and Deputy Assistant Adjutant General (Intelligence) at Army Headquarters in 1888. He was promoted to major in July 1891 and went on to be Deputy Assistant Adjutant General at Dublin District in Ireland in 1892, Quartermaster General for the Canadian Militia in 1893 and, on promotion to lieutenant-colonel, Assistant Quartermaster General (Intelligence) at Army Headquarters in India in September 1899. He was promoted to colonel in December 1901 and appointed a Companion of the Order of the Bath (CB) on 22 August 1902.

Lake became chief staff officer for the 2nd Army Corps on 2 March 1904, and for which he was granted the temporary rank of brigadier general while employed in this position, taking over from James Grierson. He was then Chief of the Canadian General Staff in 1905 and Inspector General of the Canadian Militia in 1908, introducing a number of reforms. He was promoted to major general on 23 March 1905, and appointed a Companion of the Order of St Michael and St George (CMG) in 1905 and Knight Commander (KCMG) in 1908.

Leaving Canada in 1910, he succeeded Lieutenant General Sir James Willcocks as General Officer Commanding 1st (Peshawar) Division in India in February 1911 and was appointed Chief of the General Staff in India from 1912, having been promoted lieutenant-general in March 1911. In 1913 he was given the colonelcy of the East Lancashire Regiment, which he held until 1920.

In January 1916 he was appointed commander-in-chief of the Mesopotamian Force, replacing Gen. Sir John Nixon with orders to relieve General Townshend's troops at Kut. After failing to relieve Kut, which surrendered in April 1916, in August 1916 Lake was removed from command and returned to England, and was created Knight Commander of the Order of the Bath (KCB) on 1 January 1916. He was given a post in the Ministry of Munitions in May 1917.

== Later life ==
Following the war, Lake formally retired on 20 November 1919. He returned to Canada and lived in Victoria, British Columbia, where he died on 17 November 1940. He was survived by his wife Hester Fanny (née Woodyer), whom he had married in 1891. They had no children.

Military offices
Preceded by Douglas Cochrane, 12th Earl of Dundonald as General Officer Commanding the Forces (Canada)	Chief of the General Staff (Canada); 1904–1908	Succeeded by William Dillon Otter
Preceded by Sir Douglas Haig	Chief of the General Staff (India); 1912–1916	Succeeded by Sir George Kirkpatrick
Non-profit organization positions
New creation	President of the Royal Canadian Legion; 1925–1928	Succeeded by Arthur Currie
