= John Swayne =

British Army general

Lieutenant-General Sir John Swayne KCB CBE
- Swayne in 1942
- Born: 3 July 1890; Warminster, Wiltshire, England
- Died: 16 December 1964 (aged 74); London, England
- Relatives: William Swayne (father)
- Military career
- Allegiance: United Kingdom
- Branch: British Army
- Service years: 1911–1946
- Rank: Lieutenant-General
- Nickname: "Jack"
- Service number: 17966
- Units: Somerset Light Infantry; Royal Northumberland Fusiliers
- Commands: Chief of the General Staff (India); South-Eastern Command; 4th Infantry Division; 1st Battalion, Royal Northumberland Fusiliers
- Conflicts: First World War; Second World War
- Awards: Knight Commander of the Order of the Bath; Commander of the Order of the British Empire

Lieutenant-General Sir John George des Reaux Swayne, KCB, CBE (3 July 1890 – 16 December 1964) was a senior British Army officer who served as General Officer Commanding-in-Chief of South-Eastern Command during the Second World War.

== Military career ==
Born the son of William Swayne, the Bishop of Lincoln, Swayne was educated at Charterhouse School and the University of Oxford. He was commissioned into the Somerset Light Infantry in 1911. He served in the First World War, spending most of it as a prisoner of war.

After the war Swayne was appointed aide-de-camp to the General Officer Commanding Western Command in India before becoming adjutant of his regiment in 1924. He became a general staff officer at the War Office in 1927 and brigade major for the 7th Infantry Brigade in February 1929, taking over from Major Michael Gambier-Parry.

He was made military assistant to the Chief of the Imperial General Staff in 1930 and GSO1, or chief of staff in modern armed forces, for the International Force for the Saar Plebiscite in Germany in 1934. He relinquished this assignment, and the temporary rank of colonel which accompanied it, on 6 March 1935. He was selected to be commanding officer of the 1st Battalion, Royal Northumberland Fusiliers in 1935 and chief instructor at the Staff College, Camberley in 1937.

Swayne served in the Second World War, initially as head of the British Military Mission to the French Grand Quartier Général and then as general officer commanding 4th Division from 1941. He was appointed chief of the general staff for Home Forces in 1942 and General Officer Commanding-in-Chief of South Eastern Command in 1942. His final appointment was as chief of the General Staff in India in 1944; he retired in 1946.

== Bibliography ==
- Smart, Nick (2005). Biographical Dictionary of British Generals of the Second World War. Barnsley, South Yorkshire: Pen and Sword Books. ISBN 1844150496.

Military offices
Preceded by Ralph Eastwood	GOC 4th Infantry Division; 1940–1942	Succeeded by John Hawkesworth
Preceded by Bernard Montgomery	GOC-in-C South-Eastern Command; 1942–1944	Succeeded by Edmond Schreiber
Preceded by Edwin Morris	Chief of the General Staff (India); 1944–1946	Succeeded by Arthur Smith
Honorary titles
Preceded by Vivian Majendie	Colonel of the Somerset Light Infantry; 1947–1953	Succeeded by Sir John Harding
