= William Twiss (Indian Army officer) =

British Indian Army officer

Sir William Twiss
- Born: 18 January 1879
- Died: 13 October 1962 (aged 83)
- Military career
- Allegiance: United Kingdom
- Branch: British Indian Army
- Service years: 1898–1939
- Rank: Major General
- Commands: Burma Independent District; Jullundur Brigade; 2/9th Gurkha Rifles
- Conflicts: Boxer Rebellion; Tibet Expedition; First World War
- Awards: Knight Commander of the Order of the Indian Empire; Companion of the Order of the Bath; Commander of the Order of the British Empire; Military Cross; Mentioned in Despatches

Major General Sir William Louis Oberkirch Twiss, KCIE, CB, CBE, MC, FRGS (18 January 1879 – 13 October 1962) was a senior British Indian Army officer.

== Biography ==
Born on 18 January 1879, William Twiss was educated at Bedford School and the Royal Military College, Sandhurst. He received his commission in January 1898, was appointed to the 25th Madras Infantry in March 1899 and then appointed to the 9th Gurkha Rifles in 1901. He served in China during the Boxer Rebellion between 1900 and 1901 as a Transport Officer and was mentioned in despatches and during the British expedition to Tibet, between 1903 and 1904.

Twiss served during the First World War in France and Flanders from September 1914 to September 1917 on the Staff and was deputy director of Military Intelligence, Army Headquarters, India, between 1917 and 1919. He commanded the 2/9th Gurkha Rifles, between 1921 and 1923, was Director of Military Intelligence, Army Headquarters, India, between 1923 and 1924, and Director of Military Operations, Army Headquarters, India, between 1924 and 1927.

Promoted to the rank of major general on 9 June 1929 later antedated to 1 April 1929, Twiss commanded the Jullundur Brigade in 1930 and was Military Secretary, Army Headquarters, India, between 1932 and 1936, General Officer Commanding, Burma Independent District, between 1936 and 1937, and General Officer Commanding, Army in Burma, between 1937 and 1939.

Twiss was awarded the Military Cross in January 1916, was appointed a Commander of the Order of the British Empire on 12 December 1919, a Companion of the Order of the Bath on 1 January 1930, and a Knight Commander of the Order of the Indian Empire on 14 June 1938.

He retired from the British Indian Army in January 1939 and then lived in the Hampshire village of Martyr Worthy. He died on 13 October 1962. There is a plaque commemorating him in St Swithun's Church, Martyr Worthy.
