= Edwin Morris (British Army officer) =

British Army general (1889–1970)

General Sir Edwin Morris KCB OBE MC
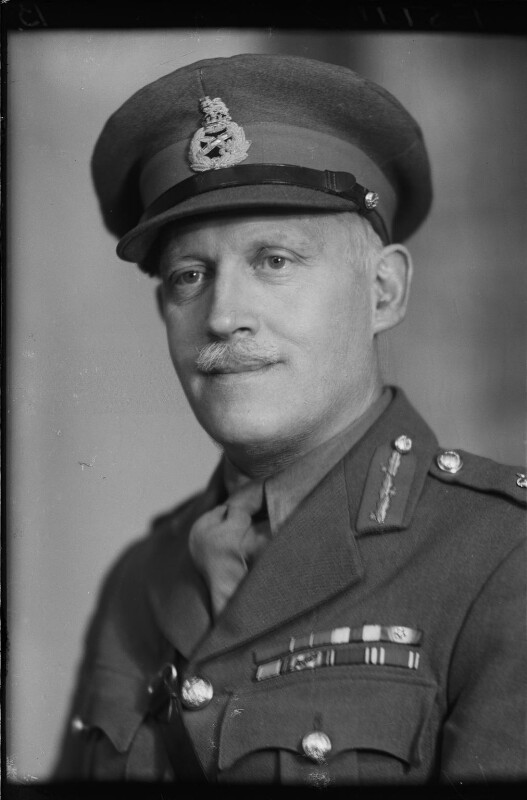
- Morris in 1944
- Born: 10 March 1889; Greenwich, Greater London, Kent, England
- Died: 29 June 1970 (aged 81); Normandy, Surrey, England
- Military career
- Allegiance: United Kingdom
- Branch: British Army
- Service years: 1909–1948
- Rank: General
- Nickname: "Ted"
- Service number: 41195
- Unit: Royal Engineers
- Commands: Northern Command (1944–46); Chief of the General Staff, India (1942–44); IX Corps (1941–42); 1st Infantry Division (1941); West Sussex County Division (1940)
- Conflicts: First World War; Second World War
- Awards: Knight Commander of the Order of the Bath; Officer of the Order of the British Empire; Military Cross; Mentioned in Despatches (5)

General Sir Edwin Logie Morris, KCB, OBE, MC (10 March 1889 – 29 June 1970) was a senior British Army officer who served during the First World War and later the Second World War, where he became Chief of the General Staff, India from February 1942 to April 1944.

== Military career ==
Educated at Wellington College, Berkshire, Morris entered the Royal Military Academy, Woolwich and was commissioned as a second lieutenant into the Royal Engineers in 1909. He served in the First World War, where he was awarded the Military Cross and was mentioned in despatches.

Morris was a student at the Staff College, Camberley, from 1921 to 1922, becoming an instructor there between 1926 and 1930, during which he was promoted to brevet lieutenant colonel on 1 January 1929. He was then appointed a General Staff Officer (GSO) at the War Office in 1931. He attended the Imperial Defence College in 1933 and, from 1934, was deputy director of Military Operations & Intelligence for India. From 1936 he was deputy director of Military Operations at the War Office. In 1939 he was appointed a brigadier on the staff of Northern Command.

At the outbreak of the Second World War, Morris was Director of Staff Duties at the War Office. He was appointed General Officer Commanding (GOC) West Sussex County Division in 1940 and GOC 1st Infantry Division in 1941. Later in 1941 he became GOC IX Corps and in 1942 he was appointed Chief of the General Staff in India. In 1944 he was appointed General Officer Commanding-in-Chief (GOC-in-C) for Northern Command.

After the war, in 1946, Morris was appointed Head of the Army Representative Military Staff Committee in the United Nations, a post he held until he retired in 1948. He was also aide-de-camp general to King George VI from 1947 to 1948. From 1951 to 1958 he was the Chief Royal Engineer.

== Bibliography ==
- Smart, Nick (2005). Biographical Dictionary of British Generals of the Second World War. Barnsley, South Yorkshire: Pen and Sword Books. ISBN 1844150496.

Military offices
Preceded by Kenneth Anderson	GOC 1st Infantry Division; May–November 1941	Succeeded by Walter Clutterbuck
Preceded by Ridley Pakenham-Walsh	GOC IX Corps; 1941–1942	Succeeded by Francis Nosworthy
Preceded by Sir Thomas Hutton	Chief of the General Staff (India); 1942–1944	Succeeded by Sir John Swayne
Preceded by Sir Ralph Eastwood	GOC-in-C Northern Command; 1944–1946	Succeeded by Sir Philip Christison
Honorary titles
Preceded by Sir Guy Williams	Chief Royal Engineer; 1951–1958	Succeeded by Sir Kenneth Crawford
