= 11th Medium Regiment, Royal Artillery =

9th Bn, Essex Regiment 11th Medium Regiment, RA
- Cap badge of the Royal Artillery.
- Active: 1 December 1942–16 January 1946
- Country: United Kingdom
- Branch: British Army
- Type: Medium artillery
- Size: 2 Batteries
- Engagements: Operation Totalize; Operation Astonia; Operation Bluecoat; Operation Wellhit; Operation Undergo; Battle of the Scheldt; Operation Mallard; Operation Blackcock; Operation Veritable; Operation Plunder

The 11th Medium Regiment was a Royal Artillery unit, formed in the British Army during World War II. First raised in 1940 as infantry of the Essex Regiment, it was converted to the medium artillery role in 1942 and fought in the campaign in North West Europe. It was disbanded after the war.

== 9th Essex Regiment ==
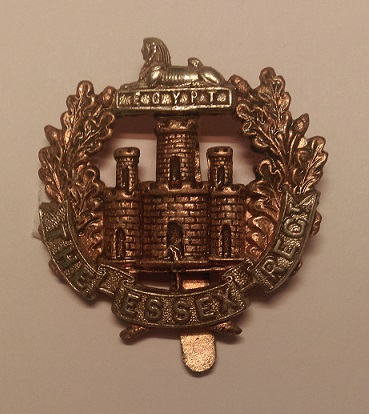
Cap badge of the Essex Regiment.

On 4 July 1940, as part of the rapid expansion of the British Army after the Dunkirk evacuation, a new 9th Battalion was formed at the Essex Regiment 's depot at Warley Barracks. (A previous 9th (Service) Bn of the Essex Regiment had been formed during World War I as part of 'Kitchener's Army'.)

After initial training, the battalion (together with 8th Essex Regiment) joined a home defence formation, 210th Independent Infantry Brigade (Home), when it was formed by No 10 Infantry Training Group in V Corps in Southern England on 10 October 1940. On 28 February 1941 the two Essex battalions transferred to 226th Independent Infantry Brigade (Home). At the time this brigade was temporarily attached to 3rd Infantry Division, but on 24 April it was attached to Dorset County Division when that formation became operational in V Corps. As the name implies, the division served in coast defence in South West England. Dorset County Division's brigades were broken up in November 1941, and on 23 November 9th Essex Regiment joined 203rd Infantry Bde in 77th Infantry Division. This division had been formed from Devon and Cornwall County Division as a 'lower establishment' home defence division in VIII Corps in South West England.

On 17 September 1942, the battalion transferred to 219th Independent Infantry Brigade attached to 43rd (Wessex) Infantry Division, but at the end of November that brigade was broken up, and its infantry battalions converted to medium regiments of the Royal Artillery.

== 11th Medium Regiment, RA ==
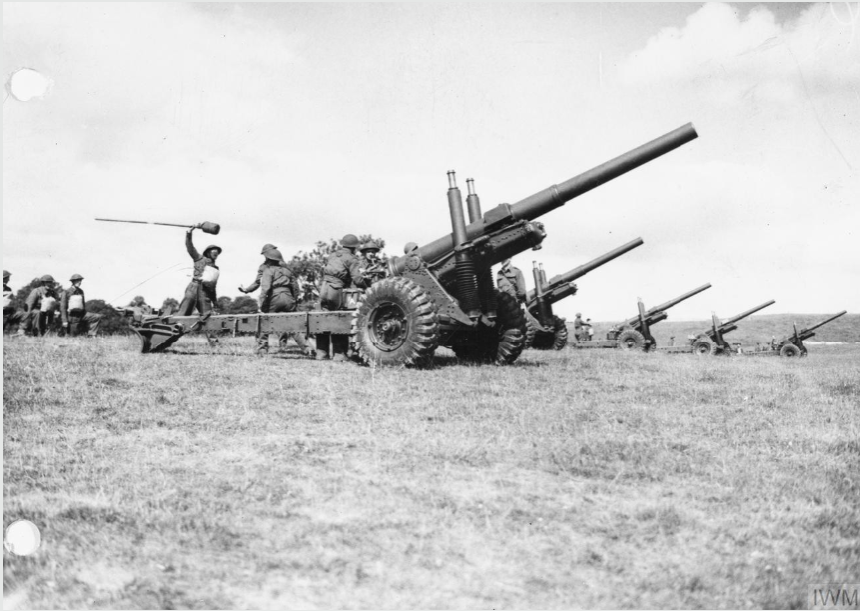
Gunners training in England with the 5.5-inch gun.

On 1 December 1942, 9th Essex Regiment officially became 11th Medium Regiment, Royal Artillery with Regimental Headquarters (RHQ) and P & Q Batteries, the batteries being numbered as 85 and 86 Medium Batteries from 1 January 1943. Each battery consisted of eight guns divided into two troops. At the time the RA's medium regiments were re-equipping with new 5.5-inch guns. The new regiment's training was carried out by the experienced 59th (4th West Lancashire) Medium Rgt, by cross-posting half of the personnel of each regiment for three months. 59th Medium Rgt was stationed at Hunmanby in North Yorkshire at this time, with 11th Medium Rgt five miles away at Rudston.

After training, the new regiment was assigned to 9th Army Group Royal Artillery (9th AGRA) when that was formed on 1 May. (An AGRA was a brigade-sized group of medium and heavy artillery operating at Corps level.) 11th Medium Rgt attended a practice camp at Redesdale Training Area with 9th AGRA in late May and early June. The AGRA then concentrated in the Northampton area for training, culminating in a series of night marches to Sennybridge Training Area for Exercise Scamper in October. Up to this time, 9th AGRA with its inexperienced regiments had been affiliated to II Corps in Home Forces, but in October 1943 it was assigned 21st Army Group preparing for the Allied invasion of Normandy (Operation Overlord) and moved to Felixstowe. 9th AGRA moved around England as training intensified, to the Brighton area in November 1943, where it trained on the Alfriston ranges on the South Downs, then to Yorkshire in April 1944, where it was training on the Fylingdales ranges when orders arrived to go to its 'Overlord' concentration area in the New Forest.

=== Normandy ===
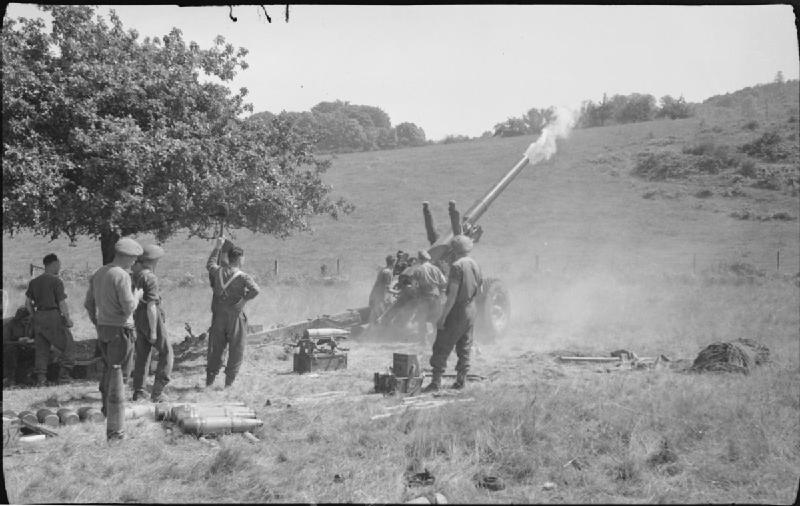
A 5.5-inch gun firing in Normandy, 1944.

On 6 July, 9th AGRA was ordered to move next day to London Docks for embarkation. 11th Medium Rgt sailed from South West India Dock under the command of Lieutenant-Colonel M. Yates and landed at Arromanches on 12–15 July. On 17 July 9th and 11th Medium Rgts were sent to Putot-en-Bessin to come under XII Corps, where they fired 9th AGRA's first rounds in support of 43rd (Wessex) and 53rd (Welsh) Divisions' continuing attacks against Évrecy, Maltot and Hill 112 following Operation Jupiter. The regiments were soon firing almost 24 hours a day.

On 28 July, 9th AGRA was ordered to move across to the eastern flank the Normandy beachhead and come under the command of II Canadian Corps. It supported the Canadian attacks south of Caen with fire tasks on enemy strongpoints, counter-battery (CB) and counter-mortar (CM) fire, harassing fire (HF) and defensive fire (DF) tasks. On 8 August the Canadians launched the second phase of Operation Totalize to break out from the beachhead. By 11 August the regiment was at Craménil, firing on Quesney Wood, which was holding up the Canadians, with 11th Medium Rgt working with 4th Canadian Armoured Division. Captain M.A. Searle was the regiment's Forward Observation Officer (FOO) with 28th Armoured Regiment (The British Columbia Regiment (Duke of Connaught's Own)) when he and the squadron commander were ambushed; Searle returned to the regiment three days later, after three failed attempts to escape from the woods in which he was hiding. On 14 August II Canadian Corps launched a new assault (Operation Tractable) and by 16 August the leading troops reached the outskirts of Falaise. 11th Medium Rgt moved up to positions near Sassy on 18 August, firing at targets trapped in the Falaise pocket. By 22 August the whole AGRA was advancing along the corps axis past Vimoutiers as the German defences collapsed. Three days later the guns were pulled out and harboured at Saint-Julien-le-Faucon as the pursuit to the River Seine continued.

=== Channel ports ===
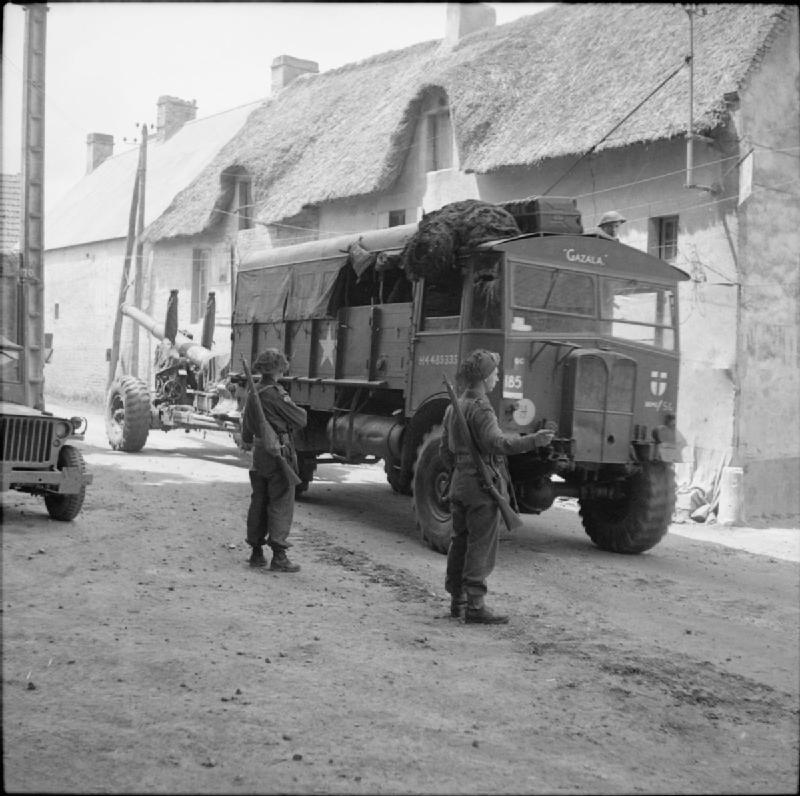
AEC Matador gun tractor and 5.5-inch gun moving up in Normandy, 1944.

9th AGRA now came under First Canadian Army and moved up to the coast for the attack on Le Havre (Operation Astonia), but 11th Medium Rgt was sent ahead to Montreuil on 7 September and did not take part. The AGRA then picked up 11th Medium Rgt as it moved to Boulogne for Operation Wellhit by II Canadian Corps, which took from 17 to 22 September. Next came Operation Undergo against Calais, with 11th Medium Rgt supplying a 'pistol gun' for 'sniping' targets. During this operation the German coast batteries at Cap Gris-Nez were firing in enfilade into 9th AGA's gun area, so 11th Medium Rgt was turned to engage them. On 29 September the AGRA supported a small operation by 9th Canadian Bde that swiftly captured the Cap Gris-Nez batteries. The FOO of 11th Medium Rgt captured the command flag of the Haringzelles Battery; this was later forwarded to the Mayor of Dover, which had often been shelled by this battery. Calais surrendered on 30 September.

=== Scheldt ===
In early October, 9th AGRA moved across Belgium to join the Battle of the Scheldt. On 7 October its guns fired in support of 7th Canadian Bde establishing a bridgehead over the Leopold Canal (Operation Switchback), then on 9 October helped 9th Canadian Bde over the Savojaards Plaat. On 23 October the group moved to Lamswaarde from where it was possible to fire over the River Scheldt. But to open the vital Port of Antwerp for Allied shipping it was necessary to secure the islands of South Beveland and Walcheren. 9th AGRA supported an amphibious assault by 52nd (Lowland) Division on 26 October, 156th Brigade's attack meeting with initial success but then bogging down. On 28 September 9th AGRA's CB officer with 156th Bde brought down the group's firepower on enemy Flak 88 guns that were troubling the brigade HQ. By 29 October, when 156th Bde linked up with 2nd Canadian Division, which had crossed to South Beveland, 11th Medium Rgt was out of range. 9th AGRA then moved up to IJzendijke to support 155th Bde of 52nd (L) Division in its landing at Flushing (Operation Infatuate) on 1 November. For the next six days the medium guns fired concentrations on call, together with CB and HF tasks throughout the day. The medium guns found the enemy guns in concrete casemates too hard to destroy, while accuracy suffered from the guns being at different heights in the sand dunes. By 6 November the leading troops had entered Middelburg and the regiment was once more out of range.

=== Low countries ===
On 7 November, the whole of 9th AGRA moved just over 100 miles (160 km) to Budel to join XII Corps. After reconnaissance, 9th AGRA HQ and 11th Medium Rgt moved up to Weert ready for Operation Mallard to begin at 16.00 on 14 November. This was carried out by XII Corps to clear the enemy from the west bank of the River Maas and by 17 November there was only a small pocket left at Roermond. On the morning of 20 November all the guns of 9th AGRA fired their first rounds across the river onto German soil. On 30 November 9th AGRA went to Bilzen to join XXX Corps and then on 8 December moved to Munstergeleen, where the spread of the gun positions was such that 11th Medium Rgt was placed temporarily under the tactical command of 5th AGRA. XXX Corps was preparing for Operation Shears to breach the Siegfried Line, but this was cancelled when the Germans counter-attacked in the Ardennes (the Battle of the Bulge); instead the medium and heavy guns carried out a CB programme against all known enemy gun positions along the corps front. 9th AGRA remained in defensive mode under XII Corps during December while XXX Corps was diverted south to help block the German advance. At this time 11th Medium Rgt was deployed just inside the German frontier, about 2 miles (3.2 km) north east of Brunssum. The guns fired at targets of opportunity, such as small German counter-attacks that probed the front.

In the new year, XII Corps carried out Operation Blackcock to clear the Roer Triangle between Roermond and Geilenkirchen. The start was postponed by bad weather, but it went ahead on 16 January 1945 with sequential attacks by 7th Armoured, 43rd (Wessex) and 52nd (Lowland) Divisions; 9th AGRA fired in support of all three divisions, firing concentrations on enemy defences and gun areas. Progress was slow because of strong resistance and the appalling weather (though some air observation post (AOP) flights were possible), but the triangle was virtually clear by 26 January, and by the end of the month there were no German troops west of the River Roer.

=== Rhineland ===
As soon as Blackcock was over, 9th AGRA was transferred back to XXX Corps for Operation Veritable to clear the Reichswald (which replaced the cancelled Operation Shears). On 3–4 February the regiment moved to its assembly area at Haps and large quantities of ammunition were dumped at the planned gun sites, which were not occupied until just before the attack. The operation involved the greatest concentration of fire employed by the British Army so far in the war. After the opening bombardment on the morning of 8 February, there was a pause while a smokescreen was placed across the corps front; it was hoped that enemy batteries would fire during the resulting silence and be located by flash spotting and sound ranging detachments. Although only one gun battery opened up, many mortar positions were identified. At 09.20 intense CB/CM fire was brought down based on the results of this information. 9th AGRA was responsible for CB fire in the southern part of the front, firing across the Maas in support of 51st (Highland) Division. 51st (H) Division made steady progress, slowed by unexpectedly strong opposition at certain points, and it was not until the following morning that it was firmly on its first objectives. It continued to push through the forest over the following days: as the corps commander, Lt-Gen Brian Horrocks, later noted: 'Slowly and bitterly we advanced through the mud supported by our superb artillery'. Although resistance stiffened, German attempts to counter-attack were broken up by artillery fire. The right flank of the offensive made the slowest progress, but 9th AGRA was able to cross the Maas to Gennep after it had been captured, with 11th Medium Rgt the first regiment to cross on 17 February, supporting the advance of 52nd (L) Division. The offensive was renewed on 22 February in Operation Blockbuster and by 26 February with the clearance of the Hassum–Goch road the regiments moved up to deploy in that area. On 2 March the German front collapsed and their remaining units retreated to the River Rhine, putting 9th AGRA's guns out of range.

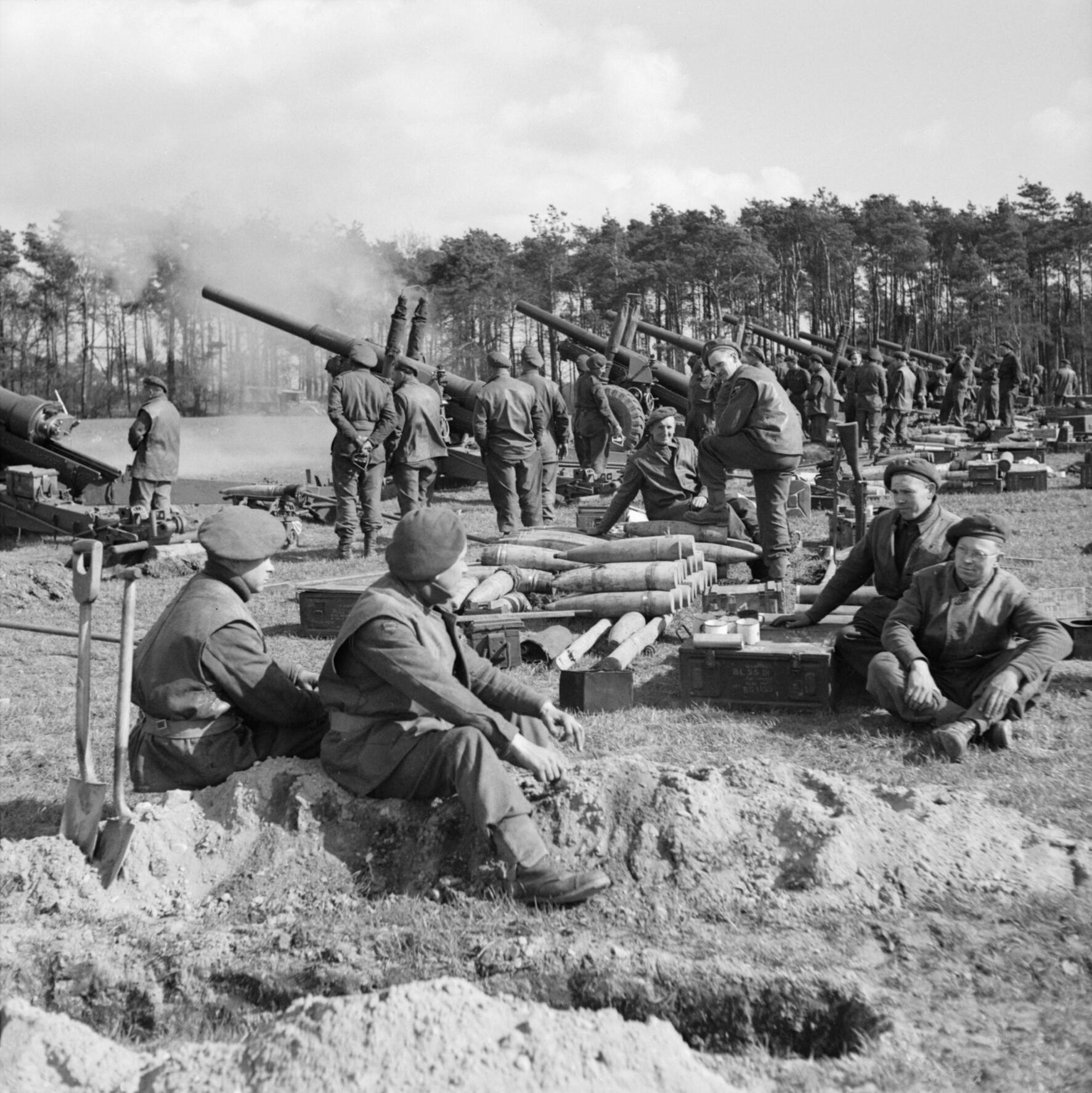
5.5-inch guns firing in support of the Rhine crossing.

On 8 March, 9th AGRA passed to the command of II Canadian Corps for the operation to clear the remaining enemy from the west bank of the Rhine. This was completed next day, and the AGRA was sent to Helmond to come back under Second British Army to prepare for the Rhine crossing. 11th Medium Rgt moved to Meerhout, and had the opportunity to calibrate its guns on the artillery range at Lommel. Acting Lt-Col Arthur Chessells took over command of the regiment on 22 March, and continued in command until the end of the war.

9th AGRA was assigned to XII corps for the assault crossing of the Rhine (Operation Plunder), and on the evening of 22 March the regiments moved up to their gun area outside Xanten, covered by a smokescreen. Their tasks involved a large CB programme beginning at 18.00 on the evening of 23 March, then as two brigades of 15th (Scottish) Division and 1st Commando Brigade went over in storm boats and amphibious vehicles the guns began firing on divisional targets, and thereafter on targets as required by call. Each attacking brigade had four medium regiments, RA, in support. The assault crossing was successful, and a second CB programme was fired before the airborne assault by XVIII Airborne Corps (Operation Varsity) went in at 10.00 on 24 March. The guns fell silent as the aircraft flew overhead carrying paratroopers and towing gliders. 15th (S) Division and the airborne troops linked up before the end of the day and the following day the engineers completed the first bridge over the river.

On 25 March, 11th Medium Rgt moved up to support 15th (S) Division's advance, and two days later was warned that it might be required to cross the river. But on 30 March the whole of 9th AGRA was ordered out of action because there were no longer any targets within range. The regiment was 'grounded', its vehicles and drivers sent up to provide a transport platoon to support XII Corps' advance while the gunners were employed in battlefield clearance. There was little role for medium artillery in 21st Army Group's rapid advance across Germany, and before VE Day the regiment had been sent to the area around Bocholt to take over garrison duties.

From landing in Normandy on 17 July 1944, 11th Medium Rgt had fired over 104,000 rounds of 100-pound (45 kg) shells (5579 tons) and almost 17,000 (725 tons) of the longer-range 82-pound (37 kg) shells. It had lost 6 other ranks killed, and 2 officers and 25 other ranks wounded. The regiment was disbanded in British Army of the Rhine on 16 January 1946.
