= Doug Cunningham =

Doug or Douglas Cunningham may refer to:

- Doug Cunningham (politician) (born 1954), former Nebraska state senator
- Doug Cunningham (American football) (1945–2015), American football running back
- Douglas Cunningham (American football) (born 1955), American football wide receiver
- Douglas Gordon Cunningham (1908–1992), Canadian Forces general
- J. Douglas Cunningham (born 1940), associate chief justice of the Ontario Superior Court of Justice
