= Battle of Chail-li =

1951 battle of the Korean War

- Part of the UN May–June 1951 counteroffensive during the Korean War
Date	30 May 1951
Location	Chail-li and surrounding area, Gyeonggi Province, South Korea
Result	Chinese victory

Belligerents
Canada	China

Commanders and leaders
(Canada) John Meredith Rockingham	(China) Peng Dehuai

Units involved
25th Canadian Infantry Brigade	People's Volunteer Army

Casualties and losses
5-6 killed 31-54 wounded	Unknown

The Battle of Chail-li was a battle between Canadian and Chinese forces during the Korean War.

== Background ==
Chail-li was held by Chinese forces at the time. Per a plan developed by Lieut.-Colonel R.A. Keane, the Battalion Commander of the 2nd Battalion, Royal Canadian Regiment, "A" Company was tasked with seizing the village of Chail-li, north of Hill 467. "B" Company was tasked with taking Hill 162 which was in a valley of the Hantan River and west of Hill 467. "C" Company was tasked with taking Hill 269, between Hill 467 and Chail-li while "D" Company was tasked with capturing Hill 467 itself.

== Order of Battle ==
=== Canada ===
- Canadian Army
  - 25th Canadian Infantry Brigade
    - Royal Canadian Regiment
      - 2nd Battalion, Royal Canadian Regiment
    - Lord Strathcona's Horse
      - "C" Squadron
    - 2nd Regiment, Royal Canadian Horse Artillery
    - Royal Canadian Engineers
      - 57th Canadian Independent Field Squadron

=== China ===
- People's Volunteer Army

== Battle ==
At 6 AM on 30 May 1951, the attack began. "B" Company took Hill 162 without opposition while "A" Company managed to establish positions in and around the village of Chail-li itself. Canadian soldiers of "D" Company of the Royal Canadian Regiment who attempted to scale the steep slopes of Hill 467 did so with little success. Hill 467 was heavily fortified by the Chinese and well defended. Canadian artillery also failed to knock out Chinese fortifications or dislodge Chinese soldiers from their positions. Making matters worse for the Canadians was poor weather during the battle which hampered their assault. The poor weather, which included heavy rain and strong winds, also canceled planned air support for the assault. According to platoon commander John Woods, it began to pour rain by 5 AM, around the same time that the Canadians had begun their assault on the hill. In the afternoon, Chinese tanks were reported to be present during a company sized counterattack on Canadian positions in the village of Chail-li itself. Despite "C" Company managing to reach Hill 269, it was unable to provide support to "A" Company in the village of Chail-li or provide support to "D" Company on Hill 467 due to the distance between locations. Eventually, Brigadier John Meredith Rockingham, the commander of the 25th Canadian Infantry Brigade, gave the order to withdraw due to viewing that the Royal Canadian Regiment would be unable to continue to hold the village of Chail-li or take Hill 467. The withdrawal was conducted under Chinese fire and while the Canadians carried their wounded and dead back with them.

== Aftermath and Legacy ==
Casualties for Canadian forces vary. According to an army report that was published in 1956, the RCR alone suffered 6 killed in action and 25 wounded wounded in action. The report makes no mention of casualties suffered by other units who participated in the battle. According to The Loyal Edmonton Regiment Military Museum, 5 Canadian soldiers were killed and 31 were wounded. According to an article that was published by the Government of Canada on 15 July 2021, 6 Canadian soldiers were killed and 54 were wounded. However, the figures listed were only for actions on Hill 467 and not actions in the village of Chail-li itself or actions around the other hills. Chinese casualties during the battle are unknown.

On 5 June 1951, both Hill 467 and the village of Chail-Li were captured by the American 65th Infantry Regiment.
