= 9th Medium Regiment, Royal Artillery =

8th Bn, Buffs (Royal East Kent Regiment) 9th Medium Regiment, RA
- Cap badge of the Royal Artillery.
- Active: 1 December 1942–31 October 1945
- Country: United Kingdom
- Branch: British Army
- Type: Medium artillery
- Size: 2 Batteries
- Engagements: Operation Totalize; Operation Astonia; Operation Bluecoat; Operation Wellhit; Operation Undergo; Battle of the Scheldt; Operation Mallard; Operation Blackcock; Operation Veritable; Operation Plunder

The 9th Medium Regiment was a Royal Artillery unit, formed in the British Army during World War II. First raised in 1940 as infantry of the Buffs (Royal East Kent Regiment), it was converted to the medium artillery role in 1942 and fought in the campaign in North West Europe. It was disbanded after the war.

== 8th Buffs (Royal East Kent Regiment) ==
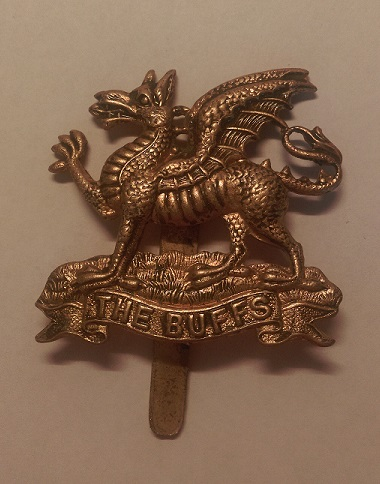
Cap badge of the Buffs.

In July 1940, as part of the rapid expansion of the British Army after the Dunkirk evacuation, a new 8th Battalion of the Buffs (Royal East Kent Regiment) was formed at Bodmin in Cornwall from a cadre provided by the Duke of Cornwall's Light Infantry. (A previous 8th (Service) Bn of the Buffs had been formed during World War I as part of 'Kitchener's Army'.)

After initial training, the battalion joined a home defence formation, 209th Independent Infantry Brigade (Home), when it was formed by No 9 Infantry Training Group in South West Area on 13 October 1940. The brigade joined Devon and Cornwall County Division when that became operational on 28 February 1941. As the name implies, the division served in coast defence in South West England. On 27 September 1942 the battalion transferred to 219th Independent Infantry Brigade attached to 43rd (Wessex) Infantry Division, but at the end of November that brigade was broken up, and its infantry battalions converted to medium regiments of the Royal Artillery.

== 9th Medium Regiment, RA ==
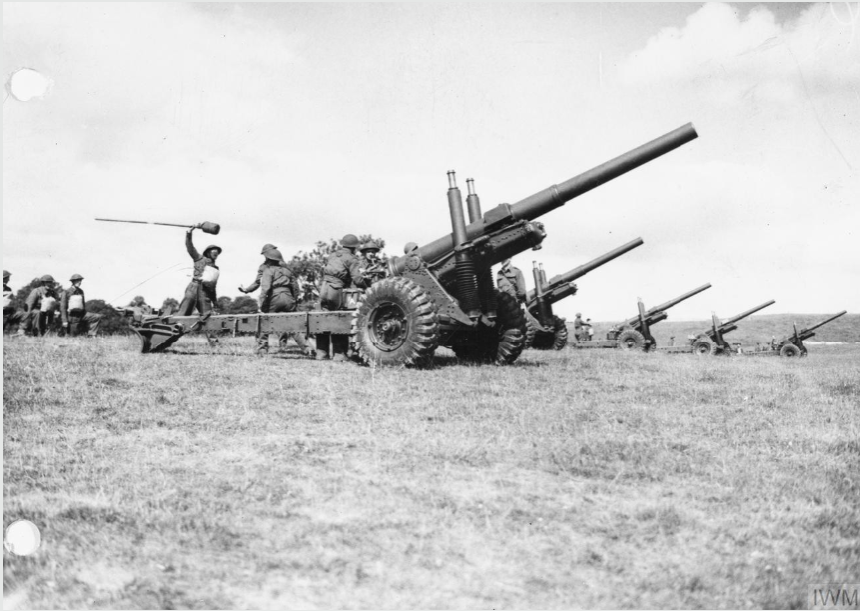
Gunners training in England with 5.5-inch guns

On 1 December 1942 8th Buffs officially became 9th Medium Regiment, Royal Artillery with Regimental Headquarters (RHQ) and 81 and 82 Medium Batteries, each battery consisting of eight guns divided into two troops. At the time the RA's medium regiments were re-equipping with new 5.5-inch guns. The cadre of experienced gunners for the regiment was supplied by 53rd (London) Medium Rgt.

The new regiment was initially stationed at Boston, Lincolnshire, then from April 1943 at Grantham. It was assigned to 9th Army Group Royal Artillery (9th AGRA) after that was formed on 1 May. (An AGRA was a brigade-sized group of medium and heavy artillery operating at Corps level.) 9th Medium Rgt attended a practice camp at Redesdale Training Area with 9th AGRA in late May and early June. The AGRA then concentrated in the Northampton area for training, culminating in a series of night marches to Sennybridge Training Area for Exercise Scamper in October. Up to this time, 9th AGRA with its inexperienced regiments had been affiliated to II Corps in Home Forces, but in October 1943 it was assigned to 21st Army Group, which was preparing for the Allied invasion of Normandy (Operation Overlord), and moved to Felixstowe. 9th AGRA moved around England as training intensified, with 9th Medium Rgt at Hove in November 1943, then at Bingley in West Yorkshire in April 1944. By 5 June 1944 the regiment was at New Milton in Hampshire, awaiting transport to Normandy.

=== Normandy ===
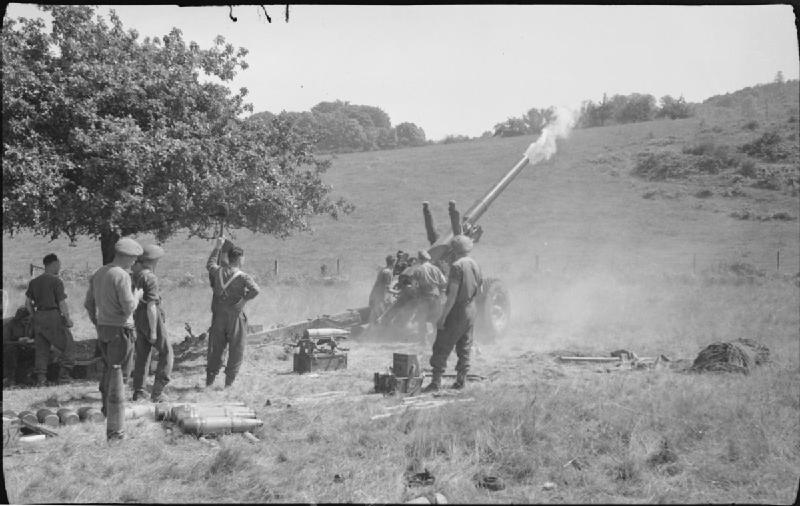
A 5.5-inch gun firing in Normandy, 1944.

On 6 July, 9th AGRA was ordered to move next day to London Docks for embarkation. 9th Medium Rgt sailed from South West India Dock under the command of Temporary Lieutenant-Colonel R.S. Wade and landed at Arromanches on 12–15 July. On 17 July 9th and 11th Medium Rgts were sent to Putot-en-Bessin to come under XII Corps, where they fired 9th AGRA's first rounds in support of 43rd (Wessex) and 53rd (Welsh) Divisions' continuing attacks against Évrecy, Maltot and Hill 112 following Operation Jupiter. The regiments were soon firing almost 24 hours a day.

On 28 July 9th AGRA was ordered to move across to the eastern flank of the Normandy beachhead and come under the command of II Canadian Corps. It supported the Canadian attacks south of Caen with fire tasks on enemy strongpoints, counter-battery (CB) and counter-mortar (CM) fire, harassing fire (HF) and defensive fire (DF) tasks. On 8 August the Canadians launched the second phase of Operation Totalize to break out from the beachhead. During the afternoon 9th AGRA HQ was bombed in error by aircraft of the US Eighth Air Force, and control of the group was temporarily transferred to RHQ of 9th Medium Rgt. By 11 August the regiment was at Cintheaux, firing on Quesney Wood, which was holding up II Canadian Corps, but on 14 August the corps launched a new assault (Operation Tractable) and by 16 August the leading troops reached the outskirts of Falaise. 9th Medium Rgt moved up to positions near Sassy on 18 August, firing at targets trapped in the Falaise pocket. By 22 August the whole AGRA was advancing along the corps axis past Vimoutiers as the German defences collapsed. Three days later the guns were pulled out and harboured at Saint-Julien-le-Faucon as the pursuit to the River Seine continued.

=== Channel ports ===
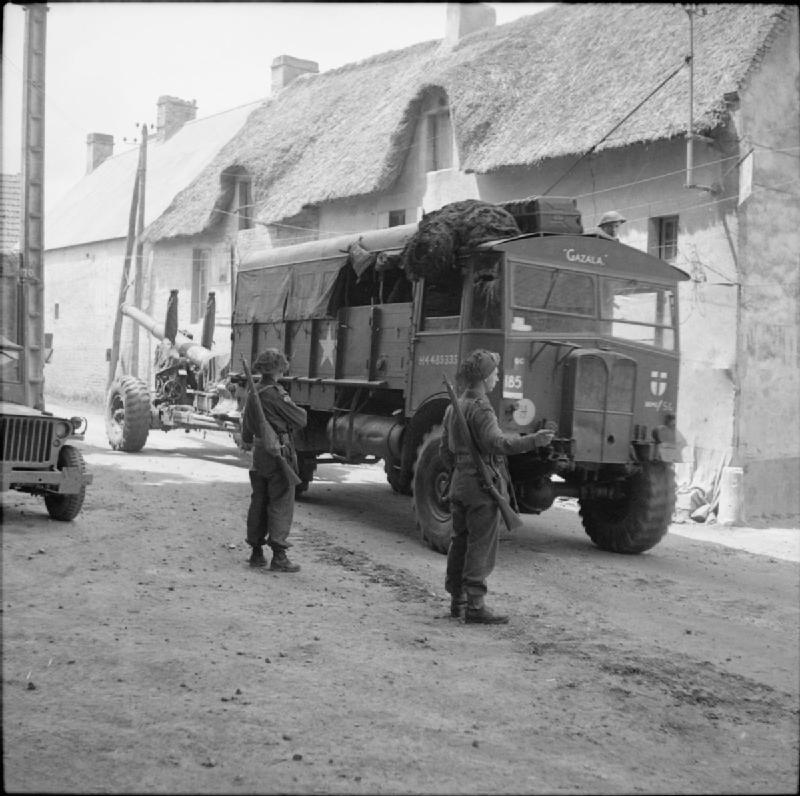
AEC Matador gun tractor and 5.5-inch gun moving up in Normandy, 1944.

9th AGRA now came under First Canadian Army and moved up to the coast for the attack on Le Havre (Operation Astonia) by I British Corps. 9th AGRA was responsible for CB tasks, beginning at 17.15 on 10 September, and by the time the garrison surrendered on 12 September 75 per cent of its guns had been silenced. The AGRA then moved to Boulogne for Operation Wellhit by II Canadian Corps, which took from 17 to 22 September. On 29 September the AGRA supported a smaller operation by 9th Canadian Bde against the Cap Gris-Nez batteries as part of operations against Calais (Operation Undergo), with 9th Medium Rgt at Audembert. Calais surrendered on 30 September.

=== Scheldt ===
In early October, 9th AGRA moved across Belgium to join the Battle of the Scheldt. On 7 October its guns fired in support of 7th Canadian Bde establishing a bridgehead over the Leopold Canal (Operation Switchback), then on 9 October helped 9th Canadian Bde over the Savojaards Plaat. As the operations proceeded 9th Medium Rgt moved forward to bring more enemy territory within range. On 23 October the group moved to Lamswaarde from where it was possible to fire over the River Scheldt. But to open the vital Port of Antwerp for Allied shipping it was necessary to secure the islands of South Beveland and Walcheren. While the rest of 9th AGRA prepared to support an amphibious assault by 52nd (Lowland) Division, 9th Medium Rgt continued to assist the Canadians, but the day before the attack it was relieved and joined the support for the landing. 156th Brigade's attack on 26 October met with initial success but at 20.45 9th Medium Rgt's forward observation officer (FOO) reported that a counter-attack had brought the Germans so close to his position that he could no longer use the radio because they could hear him. By 00.30 on 27 October, however, the position was much better. On 28 September 9th AGRA's CB officer with 156th Bde brought down the group's firepower on enemy Flak 88 guns that were troubling the brigade HQ. By 29 October, when 156th Bde and 2nd Canadian Division linked up, 9th Medium Rgt was out of range. 9th AGRA then moved up to IJzendijke to support 155th Bde of 52nd (L) Division in its landing at Flushing (Operation Infatuate) on 1 November. For the next six days the medium guns fired concentrations on call, together with CB and HF tasks throughout the day. The medium guns found the enemy guns in concrete casemates too hard to destroy, while accuracy suffered from the guns being at different heights in the sand dunes. After some medium shells were reported falling 200 yards (180 m) short, the commanding officer of 9th Medium Rgt ordered 200 yards to be added to all predicted (ie unobserved) targets. By 6 November the leading troops had entered Middelburg and 9th Medium Rgt was once more out of range.

=== Low countries ===
On 7 November the whole of 9th AGRA moved just over 100 miles (160 km) to Budel to join XII Corps. After reconnaissance, the guns were deployed around Weert ready for Operation Mallard to begin at 16.00 on 14 November. This was carried out by XII Corps to clear the enemy from the west bank of the River Maas and by 17 November there was only a small pocket left at Roermond. On the morning of 20 November all the guns of 9th AGRA fired their first rounds across the river onto German soil. On 30 November 9th AGRA went to Bilzen to join XXX Corps and then on 8 December moved to Munstergeleen, where the spread of the gun positions was such that 9th Medium Rgt was placed temporarily under the tactical command of 5th AGRA. XXX Corps was preparing for Operation Shears to breach the Siegfried Line, but this was cancelled when the Germans counter-attacked in the Ardennes (the Battle of the Bulge); instead the medium and heavy guns carried out a CB programme against all known enemy gun positions along the corps front. 9th AGRA remained in defensive mode under XII Corps during December while XXX Corps was diverted south to help block the German advance. At this time 9th Medium Rgt was deployed just inside the German frontier at Grotenrath near Geilenkirchen. The guns fired at targets of opportunity, such as small German counter-attacks that probed the front.

In the new year XII Corps carried out Operation Blackcock to clear the Roer Triangle between Roermond and Geilenkirchen. 9th Medium Rgt was redeployed to Schinveld for this operation. The start was postponed by bad weather, but it went ahead on 16 January 1945 with sequential attacks by 7th Armoured, 43rd (Wessex) and 52nd (Lowland) Divisions; 9th AGRA fired in support of all three divisions, firing concentrations on enemy defences and gun areas. Progress was slow because of strong resistance and the appalling weather (though some air observation post (AOP) flights were possible), but the triangle was virtually clear by 26 January, and by the end of the month there were no German troops west of the River Roer.

=== Rhineland ===
As soon as Blackcock was over, 9th AGRA was transferred back to XXX Corps for Operation Veritable to clear the Reichswald (which replaced the cancelled Operation Shears). On 3–4 February the regiment moved to its assembly area at Haps and large quantities of ammunition were dumped at the planned gun sites, which were not occupied until just before the attack. The operation involved the greatest concentration of fire employed by the British Army so far in the war. After the opening bombardment on the morning of 8 February, there was a pause while a smokescreen was placed across the corps front; it was hoped that enemy batteries would fire during the resulting silence and be located by flash spotting and sound ranging detachments. Although only one gun battery opened up, many mortar positions were identified. At 09.20 intense CB/CM fire was brought down based on the results of this information. 9th AGRA was responsible for CB fire in the southern part of the front, firing across the Maas in support of 51st (Highland) Division. 51st (H) Division made steady progress, slowed by unexpectedly strong opposition at certain points, and it was not until the following morning that it was firmly on its first objectives. It continued to push through the forest over the following days: as the corps commander, Lt-Gen Brian Horrocks, later noted: 'Slowly and bitterly we advanced through the mud supported by our superb artillery'. Although resistance stiffened, German attempts to counter-attack were broken up by artillery fire. The right flank of the offensive made the slowest progress, but 9th AGRA was able to cross the Maas to Gennep after it had been captured, with 9th Medium Rgt over by 19 February. The offensive was renewed on 22 February in Operation Blockbuster and by 26 February with the clearance of the Hassum–Goch road the regiments moved up to deploy in that area. On 2 March the German front collapsed and their remaining units retreated to the River Rhine, putting 9th AGRA's guns out of range.

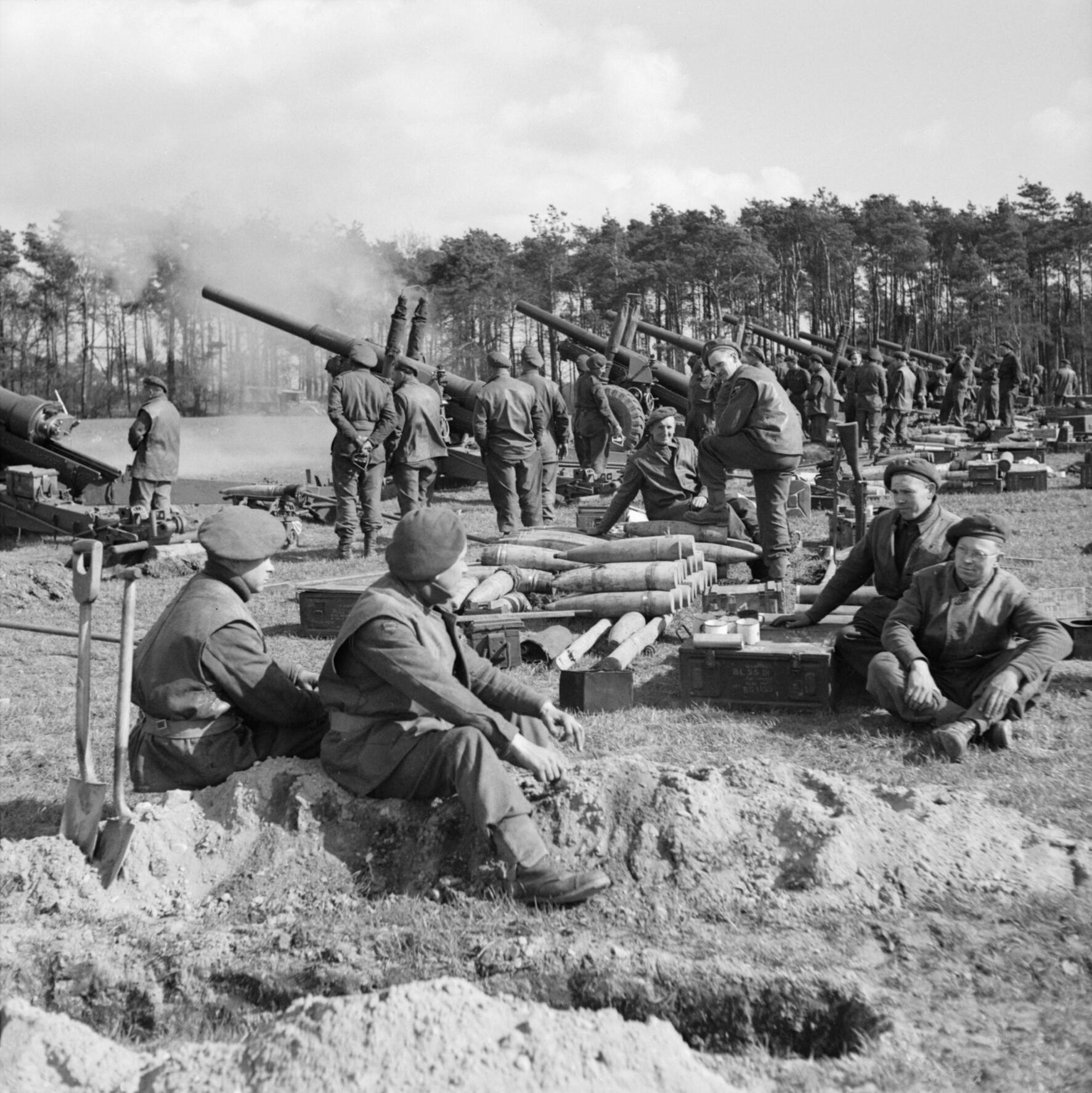
5.5-inch guns firing in support of the Rhine crossing.

On 8 March, 9th AGRA passed to the command of II Canadian Corps for the operation to clear the remaining enemy from the west bank of the Rhine. This was completed next day, and the AGRA was sent to Helmond to come back under Second British Army to prepare for the Rhine crossing. 9th Medium Rgt moved to Meerhout, and had the opportunity to calibrate its guns on the artillery range at Lommel. 9th AGRA was assigned to XII corps for the assault crossing (Operation Plunder), and on the evening of 22 March the regiments moved up to their gun area outside Xanten, covered by a smokescreen. Their tasks involved a large CB programme beginning at 18.00 on the evening of 23 March, then as two brigades of 15th (Scottish) Division and 1st Commando Brigade went over in storm boats and amphibious vehicles the guns began firing on divisional targets, and thereafter on targets as required by call. Each attacking brigade had four medium regiments, RA, in support. The assault crossing was successful, and a second CB programme was fired before the airborne assault by XVIII Airborne Corps (Operation Varsity) went in at 10.00 on 24 March. The guns fell silent as the aircraft flew overhead carrying paratroopers and towing gliders. 15th (S) Division and the airborne troops linked up before the end of the day and the following day the engineers completed the first bridge over the river.

On 26 March 9th Medium Rgt moved right up to the Rhine bank to gain the deepest possible 'search' area into enemy territory, but on 30 March the whole of 9th AGRA was ordered out of action because there were no longer any targets within range. The regiment was 'grounded', its vehicles and drivers sent up to provide a transport platoon to support XII Corps' advance while the gunners were employed in battlefield clearance. There was little role for medium artillery in 21st Army Group's rapid advance across Germany, and before VE Day the regiment had been sent to the area around Bocholt to take over garrison duties.

From landing in Normandy on 17 July 1944, 9th Medium Rgt had fired over 97,000 rounds of 100-pound (45 kg) shells (5200 tons) and over 21,000 (908 tons) of the longer-range 82-pound (37 kg) shells. It had lost 1 officer and 11 other ranks killed, and 1 officer and 14 other ranks wounded. The regiment was disbanded on 31 October 1945. Major (temporary Lt-Col) R.S. Wade, who had commanded the regiment throughout its service in North West Europe, retired from the army with the honorary rank of lieutenant-colonel on 27 May 1947.
