= 210th Independent Infantry Brigade =

210th Independent Infantry Brigade (Home)
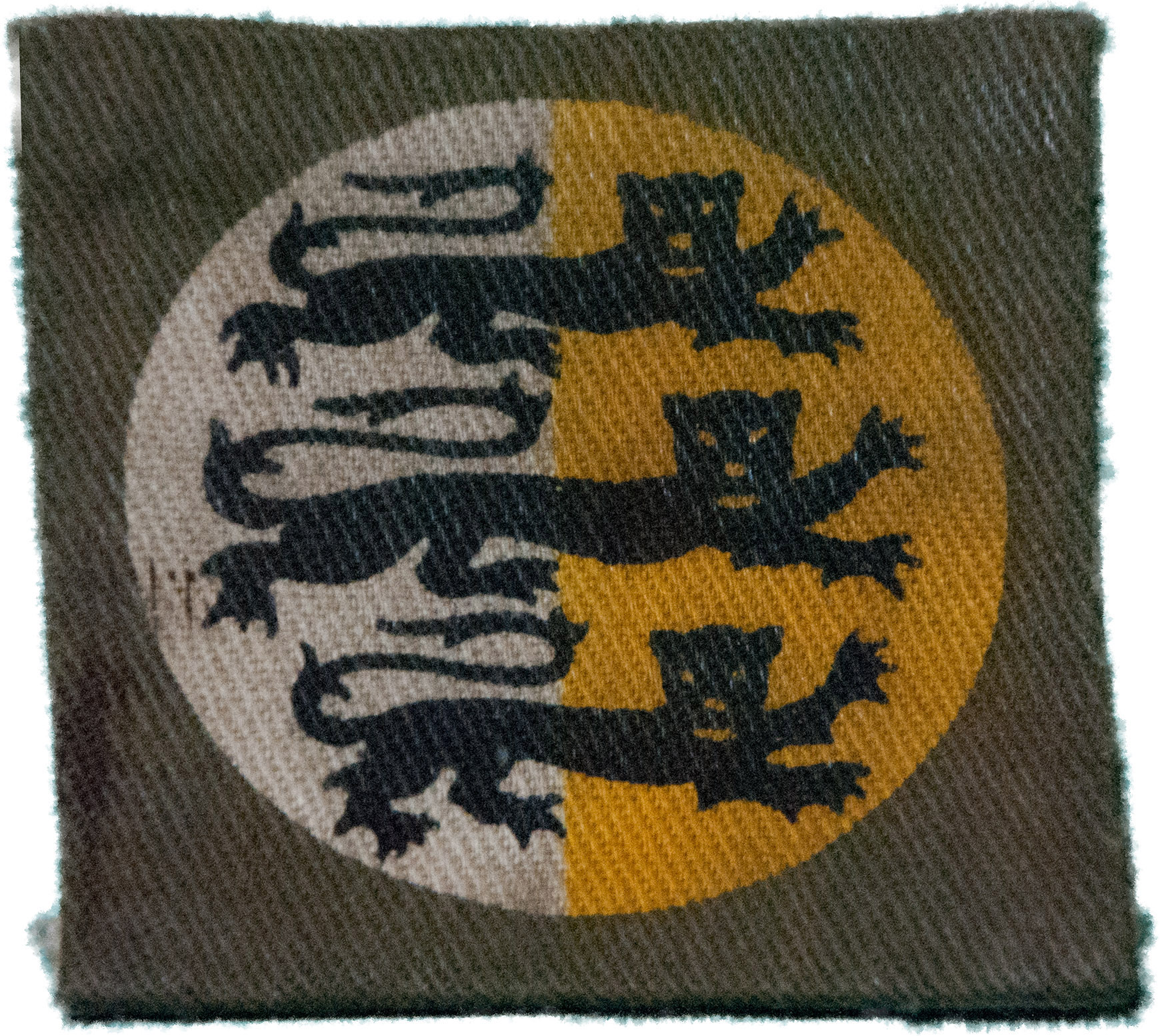
- Dorset County Division Insignia
- Active: 10 October 1940 – 13 January 1942
- Country: United Kingdom
- Branch: British Army
- Type: Infantry
- Role: Home Defence
- Size: Brigade

Commanders
- Notable commanders: Gerald Templer

The 210th Independent Infantry Brigade (Home) was an infantry brigade formation of the British Army organised during the Second World War to command a group of newly raised Home Defence battalions. It was later converted to a frontline brigade that served (under a new name) with distinction in the later years of the war, the 38th (Irish) Infantry Brigade.

== Origin ==
The brigade was formed for service in the United Kingdom on 10 October 1940 by No 10 Infantry Training Group. It was initially composed of newly raised battalions from English infantry regiments.

== Service ==
The brigade initially served in V Corps, and was then attached to 3rd Infantry Division (28 February – 24 April 1941) before becoming an integral part of the Dorset County Division. When that division was disbanded on 24 November 1941, 210 Brigade transferred to the 1st Infantry Division, and soon afterwards dropped the 'Home' part of its title. By now all of 210 Brigade's English home defence battalions had been posted away and were being replaced by frontline Irish battalions. The brigade was redesignated as the 38th (Irish) Infantry Brigade on 13 January 1942. Under this designation it served with distinction in the Tunisian Campaign with the 6th Armoured Division before being transferred to the 78th Infantry Division in February 1943 with whom it saw service in the Allied invasion of Sicily, the Italian Campaign and later in Austria.

== Order of battle ==
The 210th Brigade was constituted as follows:

- As part of the Dorset County Division.
  - 7th Battalion, Suffolk Regiment (to 8 November 1941, converted to 142nd Regiment Royal Armoured Corps)
  - 8th Battalion, Essex Regiment (to 226th Independent Infantry Brigade (Home) 28 February 1941; later converted to 153rd Regiment Royal Armoured Corps)
  - 9th Battalion, Essex Regiment (to 226th Independent Infantry Brigade (Home) 28 February 1941); later converted to 11th Medium Regiment, Royal Artillery
  - 9th Battalion, Queen's Own Royal West Kent Regiment (to 6th Armoured Division 2 February 1941)
  - 8th Battalion, Dorsetshire Regiment (to 24 November 1941; converted to 105th Light Anti-Aircraft Regiment, Royal Artillery)
  - 10th Battalion, Loyal Regiment (North Lancashire) (from 2 February 1941; to 203rd Independent Infantry Brigade (Home) 24 November 1941)
  - 10th Battalion, Somerset Light Infantry (from 10 February 1941; to 226th Independent Infantry Brigade (Home) 14 June 1941)
- As part of the 210th Independent Infantry Brigade attached to the 1st Infantry Division.
  - 2nd Battalion, London Irish Rifles (from 30 November 1941)
  - 1st Battalion, Royal Irish Fusiliers (from 12 December 1941)
  - 6th Battalion, Royal Inniskilling Fusiliers (from 15 January 1942)

Renamed the 38th (Irish) Infantry Brigade on 12 January 1942.

== Commanders ==
The following officers commanded the 210th Infantry Brigade:

- Brigadier N.V. Blacker (until 4 November 1940)
- Brigadier Gerald Templer (4 November 1940 – 1 May 1941)
- Brigadier H.P. Spark (1 May – 30 December 1941)
- Lieutenant Colonel Sir William Randle Starkey, 2nd Baronet (acting, 30 December 1940 – 12 January 1942)
- Brigadier The O'Donovan (from 12 January 1942)
