= 9th Army Group Royal Artillery =

The 9th Army Group Royal Artillery (9 AGRA) was flexible British Army unit used to command artillery units at corps level during and shortly after the Second World War. It provided a coherent command structure that could be switched between divisional or corps actions en masse. The basic units were medium artillery regiments, but others were added and removed as circumstances required.

9th AGRA was formed on 1 May 1943 from the artillery elements of 79th Armoured Division, whose purpose had been transformed from a general armoured unit into one using specialised armoured vehicles. It was attached to 21st Army Group during the advance from Normandy into Germany. Landing in Normandy on 12 July 1944, postponed from 18 June due to bad weather, the AGRA consisted of the following regiments:

- 9th Medium Regiment, RA
- 10th Medium Regiment, RA
- 11th Medium Regiment, RA
- 107th (South Nottinghamshire Hussars Yeomanry) Medium Regiment, RA
- 146th (Pembroke and Cardiganshire) Medium Regiment, RA
- 59th (Newfoundland) Heavy Regiment, RA
- 3rd Super Heavy Regiment, RA (Enabled Oct 1944)- was still undergoing training in UK.
- 738 Artillery Company, Royal Army Service Corps (RASC)
- No 660 Squadron, RAF (Air Observation Post).
