= 219th Brigade (United Kingdom) =

219th Infantry Brigade 219th Independent Infantry Brigade (Home) 219th Independent Infantry Brigade
- Formation sign of the 219th Independent Infantry Brigade.
- Active: 1 November 1916 – 8 April 1918; 26 October 1940 – 11 December 1942
- Country: United Kingdom
- Branch: British Army
- Type: Infantry Brigade
- Role: Training and Home Defence

The 219th Brigade was a Home Service formation of the British Army during the First and the Second World Wars.

== First World War ==
=== Formation and Service ===
The 219th Brigade was raised in late 1916 as part of 73rd Division, which had the dual role of training men for overseas drafts and providing forces for home defence. 73 Division assembled around Blackpool and then in January 1917 moved to Hertfordshire and Essex to join Southern Army (Home Forces). 219 Brigade was stationed at Danbury and Maldon in Essex, moving to Southend in October. Its role was training, particularly in improving the physique of the men who were being prepared for active service.

On 21 December 1917 orders were issued to break up 73rd Division. Disbandment began in January 1918 and its last elements disappeared on 8 April 1918.

=== Order of Battle ===
The following infantry battalions served in the brigade:

- 8th (Home Service) Battalion, Dorset Regiment, disbanded by 3 December 1917.
- 13th (Home Service) Battalion, Loyal North Lancashire Regiment, formed 4 December 1916, disbanded March or August 1918.
- 45th Provisional Battalion, became 28th Battalion, Manchester Regiment on 1 January 1917, disbanded 29 March or August 1918.
- 270th Graduated Battalion, became 52nd (Graduated) Battalion, King's Own (Yorkshire Light Infantry) on 26 October 1917, moved to 208th (2nd Norfolk and Suffolk) Brigade March 1918.

=== Commanders ===
The following officers commanded the brigade:

- Brig-Gen R. Dawson (1 November 1916 – 7 September 1917)
- Brig-Gen F.L. Banon (7 September 1917 – 22 February 1918)

== Second World War ==
=== Formation and Service ===
During the Second World War, a new brigade under the title of 219th Independent Infantry Brigade (Home), was formed for service in the United Kingdom on 26 October 1940, composed of infantry battalions from Southern England. The Brigade was attached to divisions of XII Corps – the 43rd (Wessex) Infantry Division, its duplicate the 45th (Wessex) Infantry Division, and the 44th (Home Counties) Infantry Division at various times. On 1 December 1941 the brigade was re-designated the 219th Independent Infantry Brigade. The brigade was disbanded on 11 December 1942, its remaining battalions being converted into Medium Regiments of the Royal Artillery.

=== Order of Battle ===
The following units served in the brigade:

- 15th Battalion, Queen's Royal Regiment (West Surrey) (26 October 1940 — 27 September 1942)
- 11th Battalion, Buffs (Royal East Kent Regiment) (26 October 1940 — 3 November 1941), converted to 89th Light Anti-Aircraft Regiment, Royal Artillery
- 11th Battalion, East Surrey Regiment (26 October 1940 — 18 September 1942, renamed 2nd Battalion on 27 May 1942, replacing Regular battalion captured in the Malayan Campaign)
- 10th Battalion, Royal Sussex Regiment (26 October 1940 — 21 September 1942)
- 16th Battalion, Royal Fusiliers (18 September – 1 December 1942), converted that year into the 10th Medium Regiment, Royal Artillery
- 9th Battalion, Essex Regiment (18 November 1941 – 30 November 1942), converted that year into the 11th Medium Regiment, Royal Artillery
- 8th Battalion, Buffs (Royal East Kent Regiment) (29 September – 30 November 1941), converted that year into the 9th Medium Regiment, Royal Artillery

=== Commanders ===
The following officers commanded the brigade:

- Brigadier I.T.P. Hughes
- Brigadier H.S. Brown (from 5 May 1941)
- Brigadier D.C. Bullen-Smith (from 9 June 1941)
- Brigadier G.P. Harding (from 19 November 1941)
- Brigadier A Low (from 26 August 1942)

== Online sources ==
- The Long, Long Trail
- The Royal Artillery 1939–45
