= Frederic William Hill =

Canadian lawyer and military officer

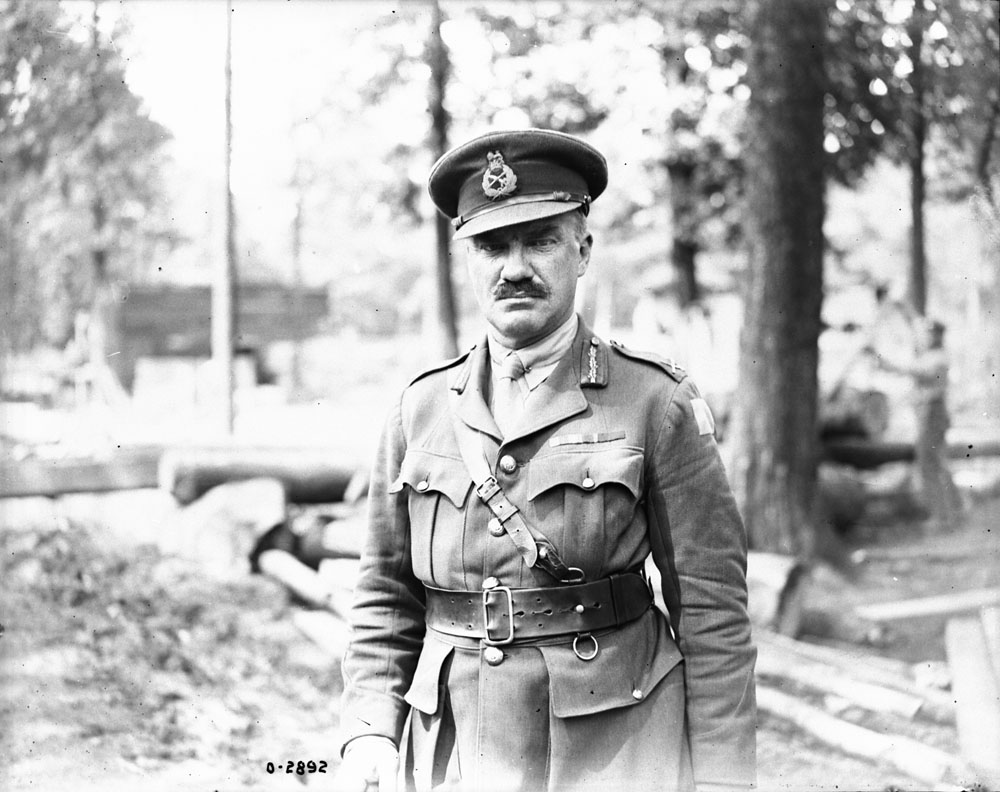
Hill in July 1918.

Frederic William Hill CB CMG DSO VD QC (8 August 1866 – 12 March 1954) was a Canadian lawyer and military officer.

== Biography ==
Hill was born in Welland in 1866.

During the First World War, he commanded the 1st Battalion, CEF from its establishment in September 1914 to January 1916. Then, he was promoted to the rank of brigadier general and commanded the newly formed 9th Canadian Infantry Brigade during the battles of Vimy Ridge, Hill 70, and Third Ypres.

Before the war, he had commanded the 44th Lincoln and Welland Regiment.

In addition to the Order of the Bath and the Order of St Michael and St George, he was awarded the Distinguished Service Order. He remained in the army until 1930. He was appointed Honorary Colonel of the Carleton and York Regiment. He also served as Commissioner of the New Brunswick Provincial Police.
