= Dorset County Division =

British infantry in WWII

- The shoulder insignia of the division
- Active: 24 February 1941 –31 December 1941
- Country: United Kingdom
- Branch: British Army
- Type: Static Infantry
- Role: Home defence
- Size: 10,000 men

The Dorset County Division was formed on 24 February 1941. However it did not take over operational commitments from Southern Area until March 10 and it did not finally assume command of its allocated infantry brigades until 24 April. It only had a short existence, being reduced to an administrative headquarters on 24 November at midday. The whole headquarters was disbanded on 31 December.

== Divisional history ==
=== Background ===
In 1940, following the Second World War's Battle of France, the United Kingdom was under threat of invasion from Nazi Germany. During the summer, the Battle of Britain dampened this threat. As the year progressed, the size of the British Army increased dramatically as 140 new infantry battalions were raised. During October, with the possibility of a German invasion during 1941, these new battalions were formed into independent infantry brigades that were then assigned to newly created County Divisions (a total of nine such formations were raised).

The County Divisions, including the Dorset County Division, were around 10,000 men strong and assigned to defend the coastlines of threatened sections of the country, including the manning of coastal artillery. These divisions were largely static, lacking mobility as well as divisional assets such as artillery, engineers, and reconnaissance forces. Using the recruits in this manner allowed the regular infantry divisions to be freed up from such duties, undertake training, and form an all-important reserve that could be used to counterattack any possible German landing.

=== Service ===
The division was formed on 24 February 1941, however it did not take command of any troops until 24 April. Major-General G. I. Gartlan was given command of the division, and it comprised the 210th Independent Infantry Brigade (Home) and 226th Independent Infantry Brigade (Home). The Imperial War Museum comments that the division insignia was "adapted from the arms of Dorchester and the County Council."

The division was assigned to V Corps, and spread out across the western coast of Dorset. Across the county line to the west was the Devon and Cornwall County Division, and likewise to the east was the Hampshire County Division. In reserve, held back from the beaches as a counterattack force, was the 48th (South Midland) Infantry Division to the northwest between the Dorset and the Devon and Cornwall divisions, and the 3rd Infantry Division to the northeast between the Dorset and Hampshire divisions.

=== Demise ===
On 22 June 1941, Germany launched a massive attack upon the Soviet Union; this attack all but removed the threat of a German invasion of the United Kingdom. However, the British still had to consider the threat of a German invasion due to the possibility that the Soviet Union could collapse under the German onslaught and the ease in which Germany could transfer troops back to the west. In late 1941, the arrival of autumn and winter weather meant that the threat of invasion subsided. This, coupled with the production of new equipment for the British army, allowed the War Office to begin steps to better balance the army due to the large number of infantry units formed during the preceding year and a half. As part of this reform, the County Divisions were disbanded. The 140 recently raised battalions were, on the whole, transferred to other arms of the British Army to be retrained, primarily within the Royal Artillery or the Royal Armoured Corps. (Note: The large intake of men into the army had considerably increased the infantry arm. The reforms intended to address this, with many of the newly raised battalions being "converted to other arms, particularly artillery and armour". In addition to this, historian F.W. Perry comments, there was considerable pressure "to increase the armoured component [of the army] and build up raiding and special forces". These pressures, and the re-balancing of the military, resulted in seven of the nine County Divisions being disbanded and only two being reformed as infantry divisions)

== General officer commanding ==
Commanders included:

Appointed	General officer commanding
24 February 1941	Major-General G. I. Gartlan

== Order of battle ==
Dorset County Division

210th Independent Infantry Brigade (Home)

Main article: 210th Independent Infantry Brigade (Home)
- 7th Battalion, Suffolk Regiment (until 8 November 1941)
- 8th Battalion, Dorsetshire Regiment
- 10th Battalion, Loyal Regiment (North Lancashire)
- 10th Battalion, Somerset Light Infantry (until 13 June 1941)

226th Independent Infantry Brigade (Home)

Main article: 226th Independent Infantry Brigade (Home)
- 12th Battalion, Devonshire Regiment (until 19 June 1941)
- 14th Battalion, Royal Warwickshire Regiment (until 9 June 1941)
- 8th Battalion, Essex Regiment
- 9th Battalion, Essex Regiment (until 23 November 1941)
- 10th Battalion, Somerset Light Infantry (from 14 June 1941)
- 8th Battalion, East Lancashire Regiment (from 26 July until 19 November 1941)
