= Charles Bullen-Smith =

British Army general (1898–1970)

Major-General Charles Bullen-Smith MC
- Born: 23 October 1898
- Died: 1970 (aged 71-72)
- Military career
- Allegiance: United Kingdom
- Branch: British Army
- Service years: 1918–1946
- Rank: Major-General
- Service number: 26087
- Unit: King's Own Scottish Borderers
- Commands: 1st Battalion, King's Own Scottish Borderers; 219th Independent Infantry Brigade; Senior Officers' School, Sheerness; 15th (Scottish) Infantry Division; 51st (Highland) Infantry Division
- Conflicts: First World War; Second World War
- Awards: Military Cross

Major-General David Charles Bullen-Smith MC (23 October 1898 – 1970) was a senior British Army officer.

== Military career ==
Bullen-Smith was born in 1898 and attended Wellington College, Berkshire. He then attended the Royal Military College, Sandhurst during the First World War, from where he was commissioned on 16 August 1916 into the King's Own Scottish Borderers. He was promoted to lieutenant on 16 February 1918. Towards the end of the war, during the Hundred Days Offensive, he was awarded the Military Cross, the citation for which reads:

For conspicuous gallantry and devotion to duty while commanding a company. Continually required as he was to fill a gap in the line with a platoon, he personally reconnoitred first, and then ably led them to the spot. All this was carried out under exceptionally heavy machine-gun and rifle fire.

Remaining in the army during the difficult interwar period, he became commanding officer of the 1st Battalion the King's Own Scottish Borderers in 1940 during the Second World War. He went on to be commander of the 219th Independent Brigade in June 1941, commandant of the Senior Officers' School in November 1941 and general officer commanding (GOC) of the 15th (Scottish) Infantry Division in May 1942.

After that he became GOC 51st (Highland) Division. He led the 51st in North-West Europe in August 1943 and led the division during the Normandy landings and in the subsequent Battle of Normandy that followed in the next few weeks. After leading an unsuccessful operation to raid the Colombelles factory area on 10–11 July 1944, he was relieved of his command and, instead, became deputy director of Military Training at the War Office in London in August 1944.

He retired from the army in July 1946 and, having attained the age limit, ceased to belong to the Reserve of Officers on 23 October 1956.

== Bibliography ==
- Smart, Nick (2005). Biographical Dictionary of British Generals of the Second World War. Barnesley: Pen & Sword. ISBN 1844150496.
- Collins, James Lawton; Chandler, David G. (1994). The D-Day Encyclopedia. Simon & Schuster. ISBN 0132036215.

Military offices
Preceded by P. D. W. Dunn	Commandant of the Senior Officers' School, Sheerness; 1941−1942	Succeeded by Stanley Oswald Jones
Preceded by Philip Christison	GOC 15th (Scottish) Infantry Division; 1942–1943	Succeeded by Gordon MacMillan
Preceded by Douglas Wimberley	GOC 51st (Highland) Division; 1943–1944	Succeeded by Tom Rennie
