= Gerald Gartlan =

British Army general (1889–1975)

Major-General Gerald Gartlan CBE DSO MC DL
- Born: 24 May 1889; County Down, Ireland
- Died: 15 July 1975 (aged 86)
- Military career
- Allegiance: United Kingdom
- Branch: British Army
- Service years: 1909–1944
- Rank: Major-General
- Service number: 4423
- Unit: Royal Irish Rifles
- Commands: East Riding District (1942–44); Dorset County Division (1941); 5th Infantry Brigade (1938–41); 2nd Battalion, Royal Ulster Rifles (1933–37)
- Conflicts: First World War; Second World War
- Awards: Commander of the Order of the British Empire; Distinguished Service Order; Military Cross

Major-General Gerald Ion Gartlan, CBE, DSO, MC, DL (24 June 1889 – 15 July 1975) was a senior British Army officer who served in the First World War and the Second World War.

== Military career ==
Born in County Down in what is now Northern Ireland, on 24 June 1889, Gartlan was educated at Downside School and the Royal Military College, Sandhurst, from where he was commissioned into the Royal Irish Rifles (later the Royal Ulster Rifles) in 1909. He was promoted to lieutenant in November 1910.

Gartlan saw service during the First World War, mainly as a staff officer on the Western Front and, after being awarded the Military Cross, he was later appointed a Companion of the Distinguished Service Order for his service during the Upper Silesia plebiscite. He was promoted to captain in September 1915 and to brevet major in January 1918.

After attending Staff College, Camberley from 1924 to 1925, during which time he has promoted to major, Gartlan became commander of the regimental depot of the Royal Ulster Rifles in 1929. He went on to be commanding officer of the 2nd Battalion of the Royal Ulster Rifles from 1933 to 1936 and attended the Imperial Defence College in 1937. Towards the end of the interwar period, he was made the commander of the 5th Infantry Brigade in 1938, which was accompanied by the rank of brigadier.

Gartlan was deployed to France with his brigade, which formed part of the 2nd Infantry Division in the British Expeditionary Force (BEF), at the start of the Second World War. Following the Dunkirk evacuation, the 2nd Division was placed on Home Defence duties in Yorkshire. He briefly served as acting General Officer Commanding (GOC) of the 2nd Division from 15 August 1940 to 18 September 1940. In late February 1941 he was promoted to the acting rank of major general and assumed command of the Dorset County Division, which he commanded until December 1941 when it was disbanded. He then served as the district commander for the East Riding of Yorkshire before retiring with the honorary rank of major general in 1944.

Gartlan returned to Northern Ireland with his two daughters and, always keen on sports, served as a deputy lieutenant for his native County Down in 1952. In 1954 he was High Sheriff of Down and the following year was made a justice of the peace.

He died at the age of 86 in 1975.

== Bibliography ==
- Smart, Nick (2005). Biographical Dictionary of British Generals of the Second World War. Barnesley: Pen & Sword. ISBN 1844150496.
