= 105th Light Anti-Aircraft Regiment, Royal Artillery =

8th Battalion, Dorsetshire Regiment 105th Light Anti-Aircraft Regiment, RA
- Cap badge of the Royal Artillery
- Active: 28 May 1940 – 15 June 1944
- Country: United Kingdom
- Branch: British Army
- Role: Infantry; Air defence
- Size: Battalion; Regiment
- Part of: V Corps; 66th AA Brigade
- Engagements: Operation Torch; Italian Campaign

The 105th Light Anti-Aircraft Regiment, Royal Artillery (105th LAA Rgt), was an air defence unit of the British Army during World War II. Initially raised as an infantry battalion of the Dorsetshire Regiment in 1940, it transferred to the Royal Artillery in 1941. It served with the V Corps in the Allied landings in North Africa (Operation Torch). It later defended vital points during the campaign in Italy until it was disbanded in June 1944 to provide infantry reinforcements.

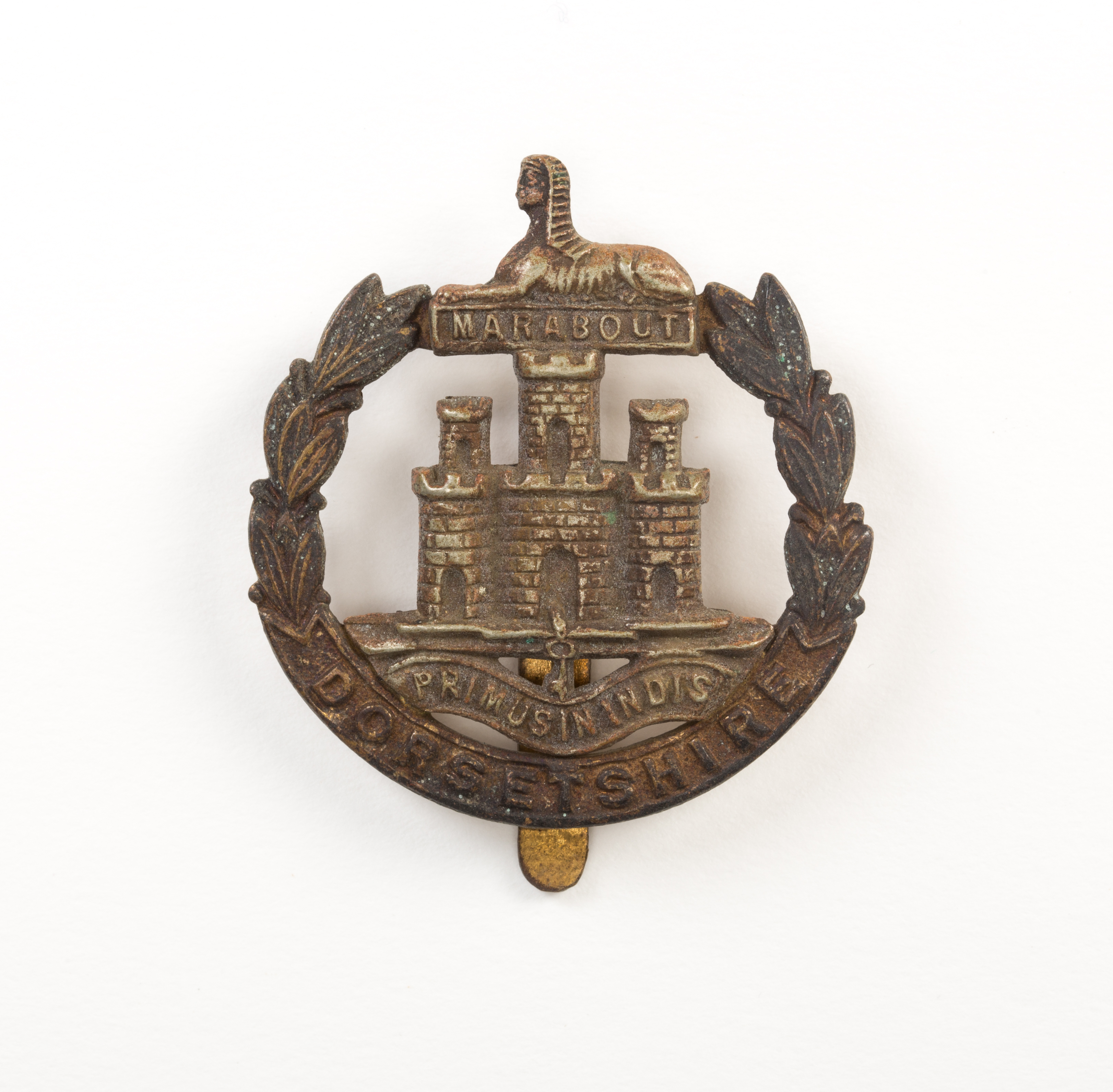
The Dorsets' cap badge.

== 8th Battalion, Dorsetshire Regiment ==
The unit was originally formed on 28 May 1940 at Blandford Camp as the 50th (Holding) Battalion, Dorsetshire Regiment), as part of the rapid expansion of the Army with wartime conscripts. It was converted to a regular infantry battalion, the 8th Battalion, Dorsetshire Regiment, on 9 October 1940.

On 10 October, it joined the 210th Independent Infantry Brigade (Home), which was being organised by No 10 Infantry Training Group as a static defence formation, first under V Corps and then 3rd Infantry Division. It was charged with defending the Dorset and Hampshire coasts against invasion. The brigade became part of the Dorset County Division when that formation became operational in V Corps on 24 April 1941.

Dorset County Division ceased to operate on 24 November 1941, and some units were converted to other roles: 8th Bn Dorsets was selected to be retrained in the light anti-aircraft (LAA) role equipped with Bofors 40 mm guns. On 1 December, it transferred to the Royal Artillery (RA) as the 105th LAA Regiment, comprising Regimental Headquarters (RHQ) and 345, 346 and 347 LAA Batteries.

== 105th Light Anti-Aircraft Regiment ==
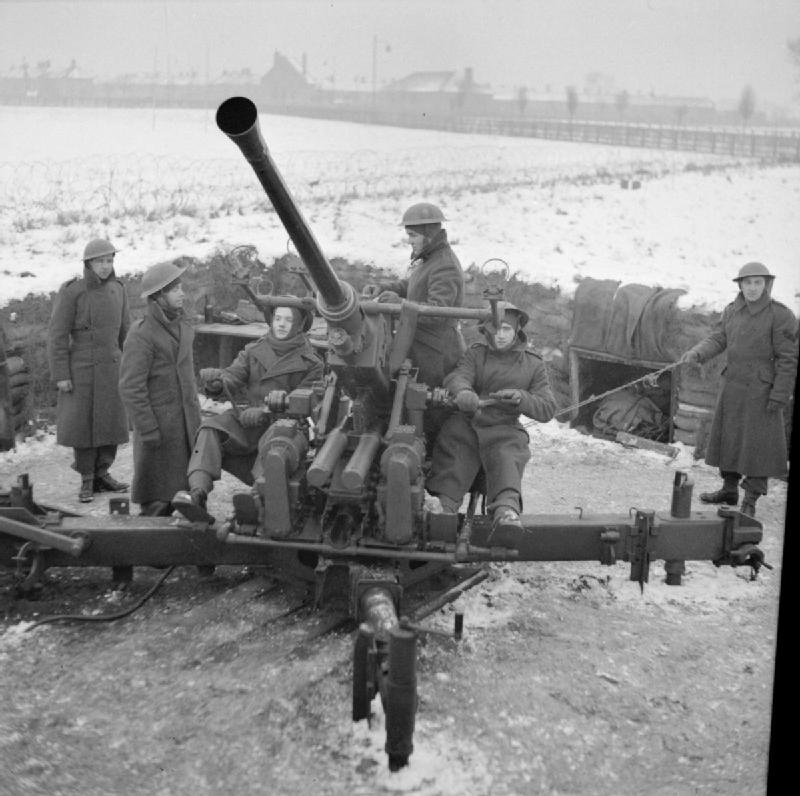
A Bofors 40 mm LAA gun crew under training, January 1942.

After initial training, the regiment joined Anti-Aircraft Command but left in February 1942 before it had been allocated to a brigade. It then came under the command of V Corps once more as the Corps AA regiment. It trained with V Corps during the spring and summer in preparation for mobile warfare overseas, for which it was joined by a Royal Electrical and Mechanical Engineers (REME) workshop sub-section for each battery and a regimental transport platoon of the Royal Army Service Corps (RASC).

=== Operation Torch ===
Allied forces began landing in North Africa on 8 November 1942 in Operation Torch. A series of convoys then brought in the follow-up troops. V Corps' HQ and troops began arriving on 22 November and took over their sector on 6 December; 105th LAA Rgt had landed by 18 December. Axis air attacks against formations at the front by divebombers and fighter-bombers were increasing and were sometimes heavy and damaging, so the need for LAA cover was acute. Moving and deploying AA guns in the rough country with underpowered gun tractors was difficult. Ammunition expenditure by the LAA batteries was high, often wasted by the inexperienced gunners engaging unsuitable targets at long range, and supply was sometimes erratic. With greater experience of 'snap' actions against fast, low-flying aircraft, Bofors gun units increasingly abandoned using the Kerrison Predictor in favour of the simple 'Stiffkey Stick' deflection sight.

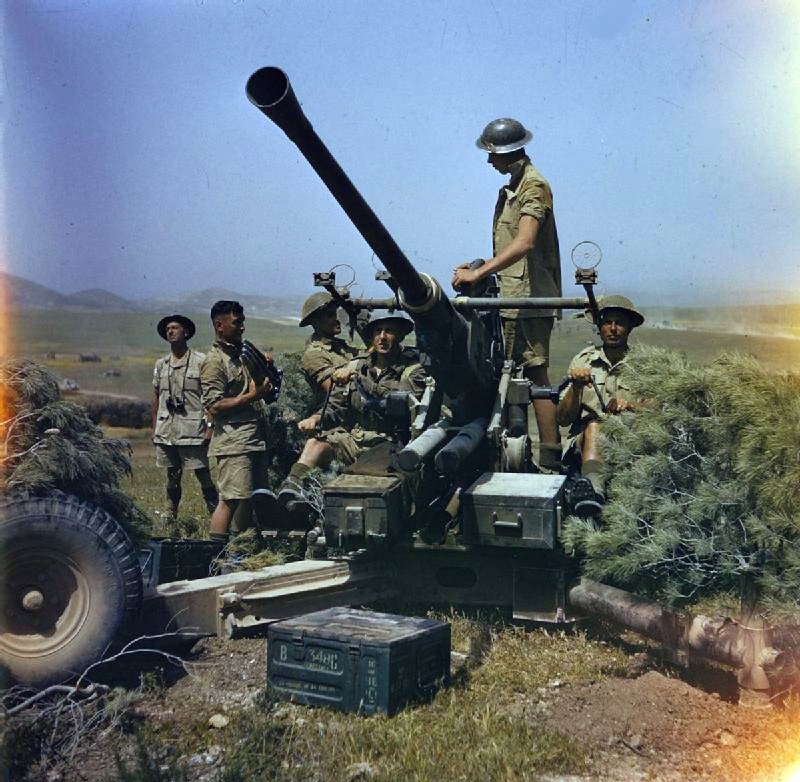
A Bofors gun crew in Tunisia, 1943.

Axis air attacks continued through January, but the First Army's AA resources had been built up by then. The whole of the 22nd AA Brigade (including a battery of 105th LAA Rgt at Philippeville) was assigned to forward airfield defence for No. 242 Group RAF, and in addition to divisional and corps LAA units the heavy AA (HAA) batteries of 52nd AA Bde were allocated to frontline defence of V Corps' units. Here, the main tasks were defence of armour and artillery deployment areas and the critical supply and operational routes

Spring 1943 brought an improvement for the Allies. The troop build-up allowed a resumption of the offensive. Attacks by V Corps were backed by 11 AA batteries, with 24 HAA and 96 LAA guns. The corps was tasked with securing the ground necessary to open the Oued Zarga–Medjez el Bab road and then moving on to capture Longstop Hill, which had defied the Allies since December. Two weeks of hard slogging followed for V Corps, during which Junkers Ju 87s and Messerschmitt Bf 109s were active in low-level Strafing and tank-busting missions. During the Oued Zarga battle (7–15 April), 15 were shot down in V Corps' deployment area.

After V Corps had broken the back of the defence, the First Army began its final offensive on Tunis (Operation Vulcan) on 22 April, which involved five days of hard fighting across the Medjez Plain before the armour could break through. Axis air attacks were maintained until 25 April, doing considerable damage, but tailed off thereafter. By early May, the Axis forces were crumbling, and a final thrust (Operation Strike) took the First Army into Tunis on 7 May; the Axis forces surrendered on 13 May. During the campaign, all the LAA regiments in the forward areas had been heavily engaged.

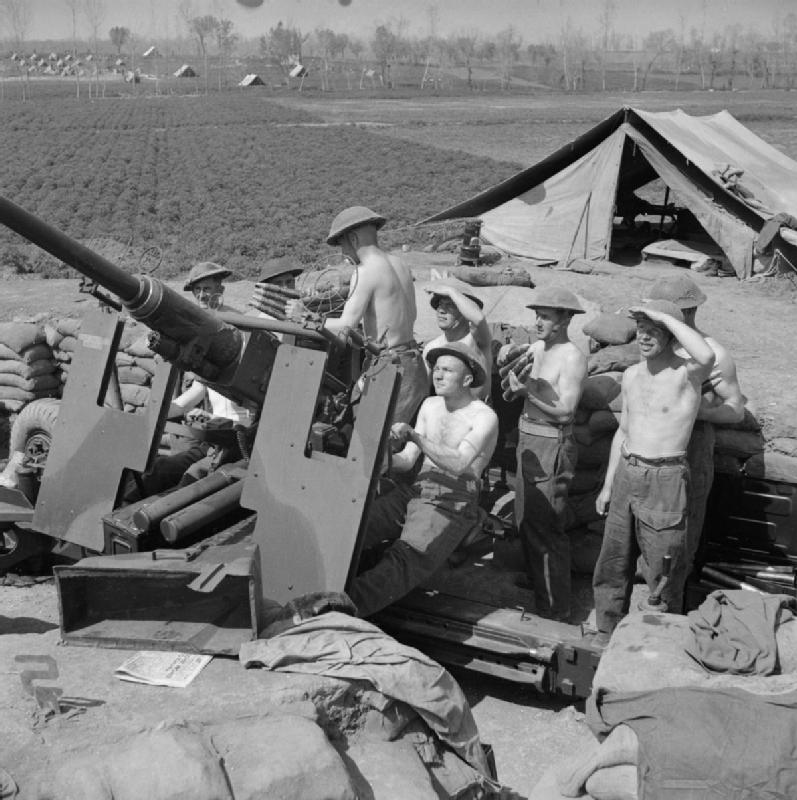
A Bofors gun crew in Italy, April 1944

=== Italy ===
105th LAA Regiment was assigned to 66th AA Bde for the Italian Campaign. The brigade arrived in late 1943, and its first assignments were to protect the area around Salerno, where some of the initial landings had been made, and the airfields supporting the operations of the US Fifth Army up the west side of Italy. As well as 105th LAA Rgt and two HAA regiments, the brigade included three US battalions equipped with Bofors guns. Further additions to its strength were made by January 1944.

Once the Battle of Monte Cassino was finally over in May 1944, the Allied advance was resumed, and the troops in the Anzio beachhead broke out in June. 66th AA Brigade (including 105th LAA Rgt) handed over its responsibilities at Salerno to 22nd AA Bde, moved up to Anzio and followed the Fifth Army as far as Rome.

The gravely weakened Luftwaffe was unable to influence any of these operations. Meanwhile, British forces in Italy were suffering an acute manpower shortage. In June 1944, the Chiefs of Staff decided that the number of AA regiments in Italy could be reduced, and it was decided to disband the corps LAA regiments and several others, their surplus personnel being converted to other roles, particularly infantry. 105th LAA Regiment was accordingly disbanded on 15 June 1944.
