= J. Douglas Cunningham =

Canadian judge

John Douglas Cunningham (born October 22, 1940, in Kingston, Ontario) is the former Associate Chief Justice of the Ontario Superior Court of Justice. He is the son of D.G. (Ben) Cunningham and Isabelle Simpson.

Cunningham attended the University of Western Ontario for his B.A. and Queen's University, receiving his LL.B. He practised law from 1972 until 1991. He was an elected councillor of the City of Kingston. He was appointed to the Ontario Superior Court of Justice in 1991 and was elevated to Associate Chief Justice in 2002. He is currently a Resident Arbitrator at Arbitration Place in Toronto.

In 2023, as an arbitrator, he finalized an asset splitting deal between the two former co-owners of Torstar, who had fallen out after their 2020 buyout of the company.
