= John Meredith Rockingham =

Australian-Canadian senior military officer (1911-1987)

- Born: 24 August 1911; Sydney, New South Wales, Australia
- Died: 24 July 1987 (aged 75); Qualicum Beach, British Columbia, Canada
- Burial place: Hatley Memorial Gardens, Colwood, British Columbia
- Military career
- Allegiance: Canada
- Branch: Canadian Army
- Service years: 1933–1966
- Rank: Major General
- Nickname: "Rocky"
- Unit: The Canadian Scottish Regiment (Princess Mary's)
- Commands: Western Command Edmonton; Quebec Command; 1st Canadian Infantry Brigade; 3rd Canadian Infantry Brigade; 25th Canadian Infantry Brigade; 9th Canadian Infantry Brigade; The Royal Hamilton Light Infantry (Wentworth Regiment)
- Conflicts: World War II: Battle of Verrières Ridge; Clearing the Channel Coast; Battle of the Scheldt; Operation Plunder; Korean War
- Awards: Companion of the Order of the Bath; Commander of the Order of the British Empire; Distinguished Service Order & Bar; Efficiency Decoration; Canadian Forces' Decoration; Mentioned in Despatches; Officer of the Order of Leopold (Belgium); Croix de Guerre (Belgium); Officer of the Legion of Merit (United States)

Major General John Meredith Rockingham, CB, CBE, DSO & Bar, ED, CD (24 August 1911 – 7 July 1987), nicknamed "Rocky," was an Australian-Canadian senior military officer who fought with the Canadian Army in World War II and the Korean War. In 1940 Rockingham went overseas as a lieutenant with the Canadian Scottish Regiment, but after the Dieppe Raid of August 1942 he was transferred to the Royal Hamilton Light Infantry (RHLI) and promoted to major. Following the invasion of Normandy in June 1944, Rockingham played a significant role in Operation Overlord and the North West Europe Campaign both as commanding officer of the RHLI and as general officer commanding the 9th Canadian Infantry Brigade. Rockingham returned to civilian life in 1946, obtaining a job with the British Columbia Electric Railway. However, in 1950 he was recalled by the military to command the 25th Canadian Infantry Brigade in the Korean War. After his stint as a brigadier in Korea ended, Rockingham returned to Canada where he remained in the military until 1966. Rockingham died in British Columbia in 1987 at age 75.

== Early life ==
John Meredith Rockingham was born in Sydney, New South Wales, on 24 August 1911 to Walter Edward Rockingham (1877–1966) and Ethel Vincent Meredith Rockingham (1882–1941). Walter Rockingham worked for the Pacific Cable Board and took his family with him as he traveled the world laying telegraph lines. In 1919 the Rockinghams moved to Halifax, Nova Scotia, where John stayed for two years before returning to Australia. In 1926 the family moved to Barbados, staying for two years. Following this the family moved to England, then back to Australia. In Australia, Rockingham completed his Sixth Form at the Melbourne Grammar School, and subsequently enrolled in the University of Melbourne. After he ran out of money, Rockingham quit university and worked as a jackaroo. Having retired, Walter purchased a piece of land at Millstream, British Columbia, on which he began a sheep farm. In 1930 Rockingham joined his parents in Canada, this time staying for good. He worked on the sheep farm for three years before enlisting in the Canadian Army.

== Military career ==
=== Enlistment ===
While working on the sheep farm, Rockingham had played rugby for the Canadian Scottish Regiment in Victoria and rowed for the James Bay Athletic Association. In 1933 he enlisted in the Scottish Regiment's 1st Battalion as a private, but was quickly commissioned as a second lieutenant. Rockingham served with the militia until 1939, serving in a machine gun platoon, and lived at the Bay Street Armoury. During this time he also worked for the British Columbia Electric Railway. On 11 January 1936, Rockingham married Mary Carlyle Hammond (1912–1997) of Winnipeg, Manitoba. Rockingham had met Hammond when she was giving the highland dance lessons that were mandatory for all officers in the Canadian Scottish Regiment.

=== World War II ===
When World War II broke out in September 1939, Rockingham's regiment was mobilized and assigned to protect vital areas around Victoria. In 1940 the regiment's 1st Battalion was selected to go overseas. Rockingham had recently been made a captain, but was told that if he wanted to go with the battalion he would have to revert to his previous rank of lieutenant, which he elected to do. The battalion traveled to Halifax, from where it sailed to Glasgow. Soon after arrival, the battalion was transferred to Aldershot. There, Rockingham was appointed commander of a guard of honour for King George VI and Queen Elizabeth, who visited that December. He was later sent to the Canadian company command school. Rockingham was at the school when Canada undertook the Dieppe Raid on 19 August 1942. A significant portion of the Royal Hamilton Light Infantry (RHLI) was killed during this raid, and Rockingham was subsequently transferred to the depleted regiment as a major. Stationed on the south coast of England as part of the anti-invasion force, on 14 April 1943 Rockingham was promoted to lieutenant colonel and made commanding officer of the regiment. On 19 February 1944, Rockingham was relieved of his command and sent to the Staff College, Camberley, for further training. Following the invasion of Normandy on 6 June 1944, the RHLI went to France. Its commanding officer was soon wounded, and Rockingham was withdrawn from the Staff College and, on 18 July, given command of the regiment once more and sent to France.

In July 1944 the RHLI was stationed near Caen. Rockingham fought with the regiment as it moved south towards Verrières. For his actions during the Battle of Verrières Ridge on 24 and 25 July, Rockingham was awarded the Distinguished Service Order (DSO). In August he was again removed from the RHLI, and this time promoted to brigadier and on 8 August made general officer commanding (GOC) of the 9th Canadian Infantry Brigade. As GOC his first conflict with the 9th was the Battle of the Falaise Pocket from 12 to 21 August. In September 1944 he accepted the German surrender at Boulogne-sur-Mer after Operation Wellhit. In February 1945 Rockingham's brigade was placed under command of the 51st (Highland) Division in anticipation of the Rhine Crossing. For his part in the crossing, he received a Bar to his DSO. Rockingham was in Emden, Germany, on VE Day.

=== Inter-war period ===
Following his demobilization, Rockingham returned to civilian life in 1946. He settled again in Victoria where he found work with his pre-war employer, the BC Electric Railway. His first position was as a personnel supervisor, however, in 1949 he transferred to Vancouver where he was promoted to Staff Assistant to the General Manager of Transportation. In early 1950 he became the company's superintendent.

=== Korea ===
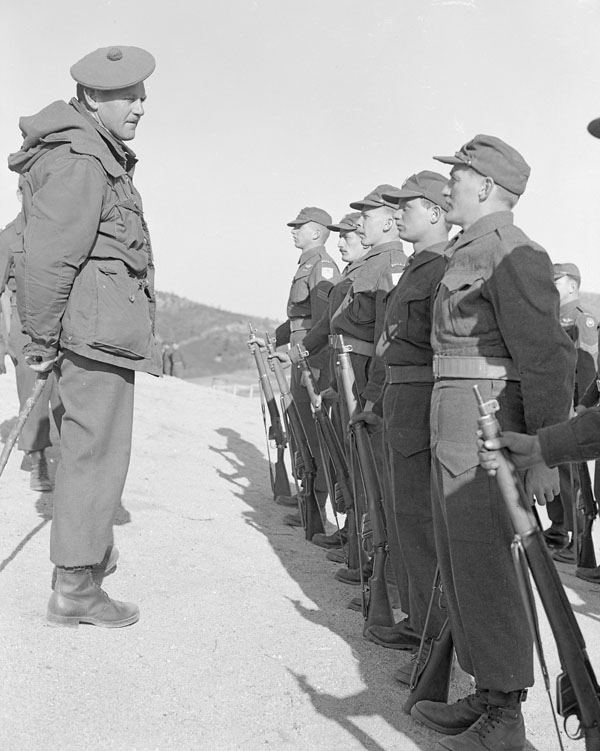
Brigadier Rockingham inspects Corporal Rocky Prentice and other unidentified men, possibly in Korea.

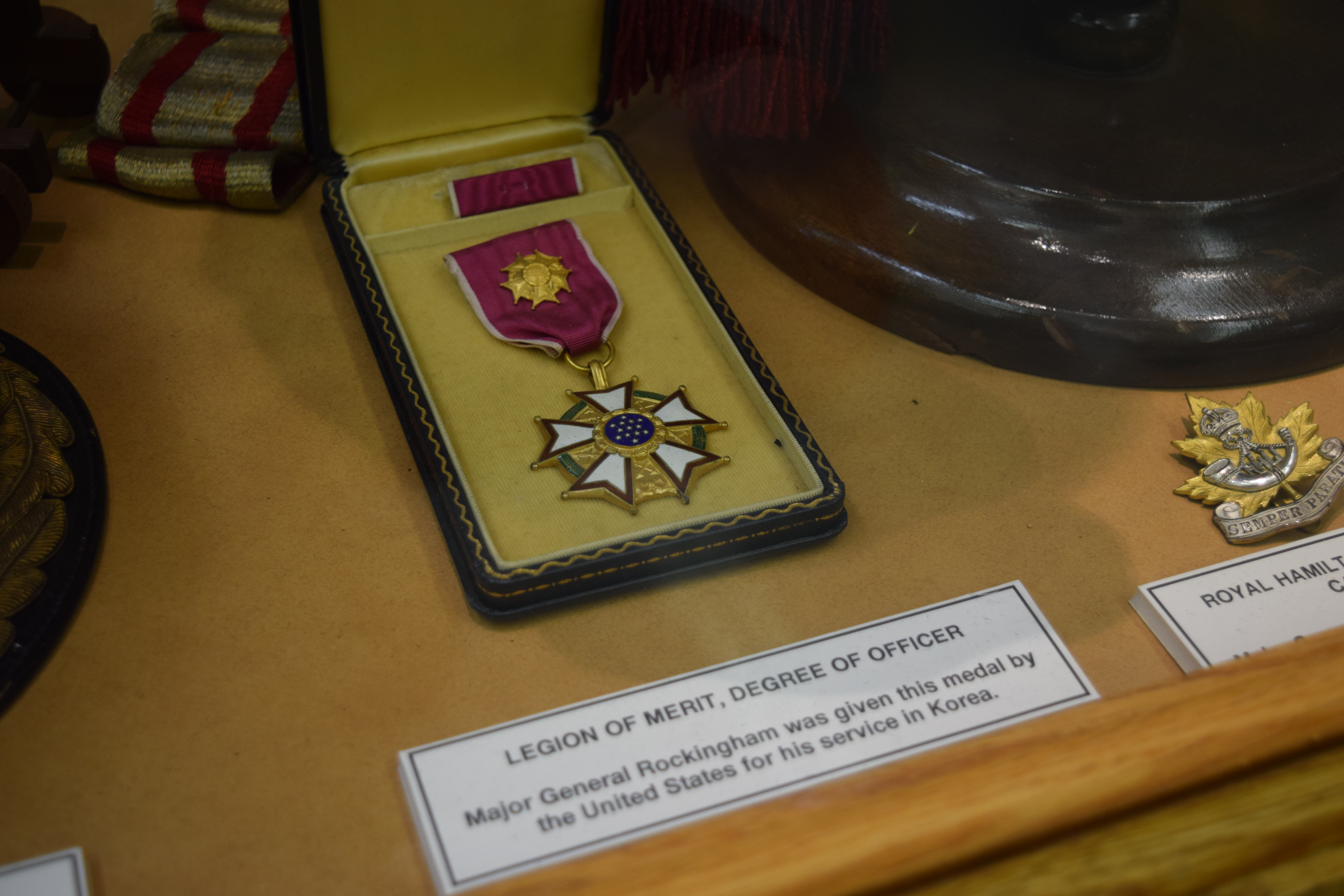
Rockingham's Legion of Merit

On 7 August 1950 while in his Vancouver office, Rockingham received a telephone call from Brooke Claxton, Minister of National Defence in Louis St. Laurent's Liberal government. Claxton offered Rockingham the opportunity to command a Canadian brigade that the government had decided to send into the Korean War. Rockingham accepted the appointment and prepared to go overseas with the new brigade, called the Canadian Army Special Force (CASF), under the command of the United Nations. The brigade trained at Fort Lewis in Washington before travelling to Korea. Rockingham commanded the brigade until 10 April 1952, when Mortimer Patrick Bogert took over command.

=== Later military career ===
In April 1952 Rockingham returned to Ottawa to the National Defence Headquarters. For the remainder of his military career Rockingham served as a staff officer in the Canadian Army. In 1953 he took command of the 3rd Canadian Infantry Brigade, in 1954 the 1st Canadian Infantry Brigade, in 1957 Quebec Command, and in 1961 Western Command Edmonton. In 1954 he was promoted to major general. Rockingham retired from the military in 1966, and that same year was made honorary colonel of the Canadian Scottish.

== Retirement and final years ==
In his later years Rockingham served as a volunteer for various organizations. He was at various times a member of the Canadian Olympic Committee, a counselor for the Canada West Foundation, honorary chairman of the Canadian National Ski Team, and director of the Vancouver Island Colleges Foundation. John and Mary had two children: John Robert Meredith and Audrey Vincent. He died in Qualicum Beach, British Columbia on 7 July 1987 at age 75.
