= 226th Infantry Brigade (United Kingdom) =

226th Infantry Brigade 226th Independent Infantry Brigade (Home)
- Active: May 1915–1919; 11 January – 1 December 1941
- Country: United Kingdom
- Branch: British Army
- Type: Infantry Brigade
- Role: Training and Home Defence
- Part of: World War I: Southern Army; 71st Division (attached); 67th (2nd Home Counties) Division (attached); World War II: Dorset County Division

The 226th Infantry Brigade was a Home Service formation of the British Army that existed under various short-lived titles in both World War I and World War II.

== World War I ==
On the outbreak of the World War I, the Territorial Force (TF) immediately mobilised for home defence, but shortly afterwards (31 August 1914), its units were authorised to raise 2nd battalions formed from those men who had not volunteered for, or were not fit for, overseas service, together with new volunteers, while the 1st Line went overseas to supplement the Regulars. Early in 1915 the 2nd Line TF battalions were raised to full strength to form new divisions, and began to form Reserve (3rd Line) units to supply drafts. The remaining Home Service men were separated out in May 1915 to form brigades of Coast Defence Battalions (termed Provisional Battalions from June 1915).

=== 7th Provisional Brigade ===
7th Provisional Brigade was one of these formations, with the following composition:

- 7th Provisional Yeomanry Squadron
- 7th Provisional Cyclist Company
- 7th Provisional Battery Royal Field Artillery
- 7th Provisional Field Company Royal Engineers
- 29th Provisional Battalion from home service details of the Sherwood Foresters Brigade (5th, 6th, 7th (Robin Hood) and 8th Bns, Sherwood Foresters), and the 5th and 6th Bns, North Staffordshire Regiment
- 81st Provisional Battalion from home service details of the Warwickshire Brigade (5th, 6th, 7th and 8th Bns, Royal Warwickshire Regiment) (left November 1915)
- 82nd Provisional Battalion from home service details of the Gloucester and Worcester Brigade (4th and 6th Bns Gloucestershire Regiment and 7th and 8th Bns Worcestershire Regiment)
- 107th Provisional Battalion from home service details of the 17th, 18th and 21st Bns,London Regiment
- 108th Provisional Battalion from home service details of the 23rd and 24th Bns, London Regiment
- 7th Provisional Field Ambulance Royal Army Medical Corps (from details of 2nd and 3rd North Midland and 5th and 6th London Field Ambulances)
- 7th Provisional Brigade Train Army Service Corps

Also attached:

- 2/8th (Cyclist) Battalion Essex Regiment
- 2/1st Warwick Field Brigade RFA

These units had fluctuating strengths. For example, in November 1915 the 82nd Provisional Bn consisted of 1550 men, but drafts to the 2nd and 3rd Line TF units and 63rd Provisional Battalion (in 5th Provisional Brigade) reduced this to 1100, including just under 200 men of the National Guard. The Battalion War Diary complains that many of the TF men being received from the Gloucesters and Worcesters 'especially those sent from Bristol have ailments which will prevent them ever becoming efficient soldiers'. The National Guard (or National Reserve) men would have been in Medical Category C.

The Provisional Brigades were dispersed in defence positions along the East Anglian coast. In July 1916, 7th Provisional Bde was at Frinton-on-Sea and Walton-on-the-Naze, forming part of Southern Army of Home Forces.

=== 226th Mixed Brigade ===
The Military Service Act 1916 swept away the Home/Foreign service distinction, and all TF soldiers became liable for overseas service, if medically fit. The Provisional Brigades thus became anomalous, and at the end of 1916 their units became numbered battalions of their parent units. Part of their role was physical conditioning to render men fit for drafting overseas. 7th Provisional Brigade became 226th Mixed Brigade in December 1916, with its units redesignated as follows from 1 January 1917:

- General Officer Commanding: Brigadier-General J.F. Erskine (until 24 October 1917)
  Brigadier-General Hon. C.G. Fortescue (21 November 1917 – 11 March 1918)
  Brigadier-General B.C.M. Carter (from 25 March 1918)
- 1206th (South Midland) Battery, RFA (from 7th Provisional Battery)
- 646th (London) Field Company, RE (from 7th Provisional Field Company)
- 17th Battalion, Gloucestershire Regiment (from 82nd Provisional Battalion)
- 21st Battalion, Sherwood Foresters (from 29th Provisional Battalion, disbanded 12 January 1918)
- 2/6th Battalion, Durham Light Infantry (joined 1 September 1917 from 71st Division, became Garrison Guard battalion and joined 59th (2nd North Midland) Division 1 May 1918)
- 28th (Home Service) Battalion, Durham Light Infantry (raised 27 April 1918)
- 29th (City of London) Battalion, London Regiment (former 100th Provisional Bn, joined September 1917 from 71st Division)
- 30th (City of London) Battalion, London Regiment (former 101st Provisional Bn, joined 5 February 1918 from 71st Division)
- 31st Battalion, London Regiment (from 107th Provisional Battalion, disbanded 7 September 1918)
- 32nd Battalion, London Regiment (from 108th Provisional Battalion, disbanded 13 April 1918)
- 2/1st London Heavy Battery, Royal Garrison Artillery (joined 71st Division 9 March 1917 when 58th (2/1st London) Division went overseas)
- 2/2nd London Heavy Battery, RGA (joined 71st Division 9 March 1917)

=== Service ===
At first, 226th Brigade had no divisional allocation. Then from 13 April 1917 it was attached to 71st Division, a Home Service formation also composed of former Provisional Battalions.

On 26 November 1917, 1212th (West Riding) Battery transferred to 43rd Brigade, Royal Field Artillery, which was reforming in 67th (2nd Home Counties) Division.

On 10 January 1918, instructions were issued to break up 71st Division by mid-March. 226th Brigade exchanged some units with other brigades of the division and was then attached to 67th (2nd Home Counties) Division (again, without formally being part of the division).

In May 1918 each of the non-divisional home service brigades provided one Garrison Guard battalion to reconstitute the 59th (2nd North Midland) Division in France. 226th Brigade supplied the 2/6th Durham LI to the 177th (2/1st Lincoln and Leicester) Brigade, which was replaced in the brigade by a newly raised Home Service battalion of the regiment.

The brigade never served overseas, and was demobilised early in 1919.

== World War II ==
On 11 January 1941, the 226th Independent Infantry Brigade (Home) was organised. It was commanded by Brigadier J.C.A. Birch (Brig H.S. Brown from 27 June 1941) and consisted of newly raised infantry battalions.

=== Service ===
Upon formation, the brigade came under Southern Area headquarters until 28 February 1941 when it briefly came under command of 3rd Infantry Division. On 24 April 1941, the 226th Brigade became part of the newly created Dorset County Division, which had taken over the operational commitments of Southern Area.

Dorset County Division was broken up on 24 November 1941, and the brigade was attached to Southern Command until 1 December, when its headquarters was re-designated HQ 34th Army Tank Brigade. with the converted 8th Battalion, Essex Regiment and other units.

=== Order of Battle ===
The composition of 226th Brigade was as follows:

- 9th Battalion, Buffs (Royal East Kent Regiment) (27 January - 21 February 1941)
- 12th Battalion, Devonshire Regiment (27 January - 19 June 1941)
- 14th Battalion, Royal Warwickshire Regiment (27 January - 9 June 1941)
- 8th Battalion, Essex Regiment (28 February 1941 - 1 December 1941, converted to 153rd Regiment Royal Armoured Corps)
- 9th Battalion, Essex Regiment (28 February – 23 November 1941, converted to 11th Medium Regiment, Royal Artillery (December 1942))
- 10th Battalion, Somerset Light Infantry (14 June – 26 July 1941)
- 8th Battalion, East Lancashire Regiment (26 July – 19 November 1941, converted to the 144th Regiment Royal Armoured Corps)
