= Operation Wellhit =

September 1944 battle in Boulogne, France, during WW2

Operation Wellhit (Battle of Boulogne)
- Part of Western Front, in the Second World War
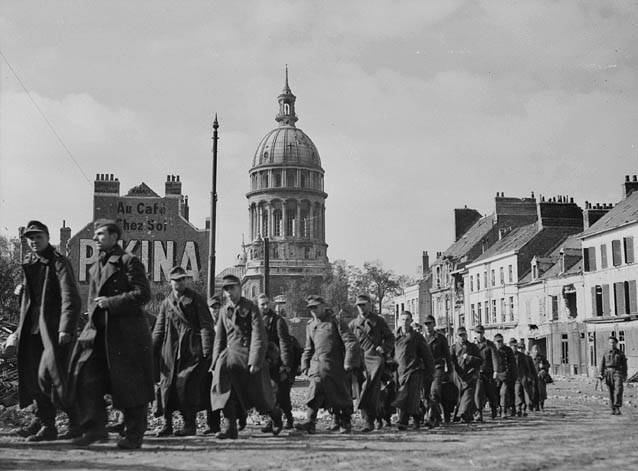
- German prisoners marching through Boulogne shortly after its capture, September 22, 1944
Date	September 17–22, 1944
Location	Boulogne-sur-Mer, France 50°43′35″N 1°36′53″E
Result	Allied victory

Belligerents
Canada; United Kingdom	Germany

Commanders and leaders
(Canada) Daniel Spry	(Nazi Germany) Ferdinand Heim (surrendered)

Strength
2 infantry brigades supporting armour, artillery and aircraft	10,000

Casualties and losses
600 killed or wounded	c. 500 killed or wounded 9,500 captured
- Boulogne-sur-Mer in Northern France, a sub-prefecture of the department of Pas-de-Calais

Operation Wellhit (the Battle of Boulogne) from 17 to 22 September 1944, was an operation of the Second World War by the 3rd Canadian Division of the First Canadian Army to take the fortified port of Boulogne in northern France. The 9th Canadian Infantry Brigade had hoped to take Boulogne off the march as it advanced up the coast but it was stopped by the German fortifications 5 mi (8.0 km) from the city.

The Boulogne defences were incomplete but were sufficiently formidable to justify massive bombardments before and during the assault and extensive use of specialized armour from the 79th Armoured Division. Despite the lower than expected level of material damage by the bombardments, the high degree of co-ordination between artillery, air force, tanks and infantry greatly aided the success of the operation.

== Background ==
=== Fortress Boulogne ===
Boulogne was one of several Channel ports to be named as a fortress by Adolf Hitler. The idea was that these would be heavily fortified towns manned by troops committed to fight to the end, thus denying the Allies the use of the facilities and committing Allied troops at least to a containment role. In practice, Boulogne's landward defences were incomplete, many of its garrison troops were second-rate and demoralized by their isolation and the obvious inability of the Wehrmacht to rescue or support them. In the event, none of the strongpoints fought to the end, preferring to surrender when confronted by powerful forces. Their commander, Ferdinand Heim, had a realistic appreciation of the situation.

The city and port of Boulogne is sited at the mouth of the River Liane, which flows north-north-westwards into the sea, which is to the north-west of the centre. The Liane splits the urban area, with the western side forming a high, 250 ft (76 m), peninsula between the river and the coast. High ground surrounds the city, with prominent heights, which had been fortified over the centuries. The most significant fortifications and artillery batteries were at La Tresorerie, inland from Wimereux and 3 mi (4.8 km) north of the centre, at Mont Lambert, 2 mi (3.2 km) east of the city centre, Herquelingue 2.5 mi (4.0 km) south-east of the city and various fortifications south of Outreau on the peninsula. Heim had been appointed as commander only a few weeks before Boulogne became isolated by the advance of the Allies through northern France. The coastal fortifications were strong but little had been done on the landward side, apart from some hastily built field defences. He was ordered to create a substantial defensive zone but he had neither the specialist nor the resources to achieve this, "I merely put a big red circle on my map to show that the demolitions had been theoretically carried out".

=== Allied supply ===
The Allied advance into Germany depended upon supplies to the front, which was seriously constrained by the lack of convenient ports. Boulogne could not be contained until a general surrender of German forces; the port was too important as a supply entrepôt. The vulnerability of Boulogne was not appreciated by the Canadian Army commander, Harry Crerar, who judged that a full set-piece assault would be necessary, supported by heavy bombardments from land, air and sea and with specialized armour. He also wished to be certain of success, to maintain the momentum following the fall of Le Havre and keep up the psychological pressure upon the remaining fortresses at Calais, Dunkirk and elsewhere.

== Prelude ==
=== Allied preparations ===
Preparations for Wellhit were constrained by the difficulty of moving artillery ammunition from Normandy and Dieppe and by the need to complete Operation Astonia, the siege of Le Havre, before armour and artillery could become available. The Canadians gained useful intelligence on the German defences through information from evacuated civilians (8,000 were expelled by the occupiers) and with the help of the local French Resistance.

Attempts were made, by air and artillery bombardment, to weaken the German defences. There was also a large bombardment in the final ninety minutes, employing several hundred heavy and medium bombers and a creeping barrage. This attempt at the destruction of defences was surprisingly ineffective; Heim said "amongst personnel, casualties were almost negligible" and that permanent installations suffered little damage. Bomb craters proved to be a great hindrance to armoured vehicles supporting the infantry attacks. Canadian assessments noted that within the bombardment area, progress was significantly quicker than elsewhere, due to the impact upon the defenders.

=== Canadian plan ===
The outline of the attack was that the northern and southern defences would be contained or diverted while the main attack would drive into Boulogne from the east. Since German artillery at La Tresorerie posed a threat to the main assault, an attack by North Shore Regiment of the 8th Brigade would go in here earlier than the main attack. In the main attack, two infantry brigades would advance parallel to the main road from La Capelle to the east; the 8th Canadian Infantry Brigade (comprising Le Régiment de la Chaudière and Queen's Own Rifles of Canada) would be north of the road while the 9th Canadian Infantry Brigade (Stormont, Dundas and Glengarry Highlanders and North Nova Scotia Highlanders) would be south of it. Once the main urban area had been captured, 8th Brigade would clear the area around Wimille, Wimereux and Fort de la Crèche and 9th Brigade would clear the Outreau peninsula.

== Assault ==
=== 17 September ===
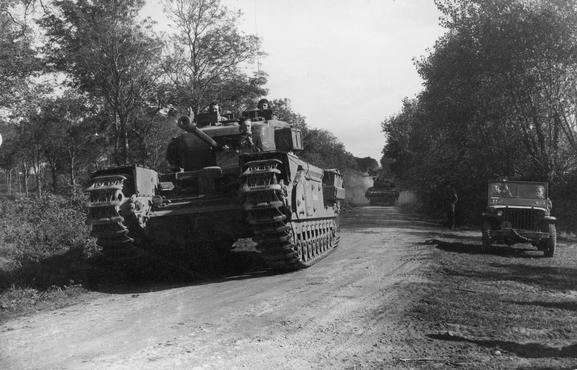
A Churchill tank leads a troop of Sherman flail tanks of the specialist 79th Armoured Division during the assault on Boulogne, September 1944

The main attacks went well. In both attacks, infantry had been transported in Kangaroo armoured personnel carriers. The 8th Brigade captured Rupembert and its radar installation intact, and consolidated in Marlborough [1 mi (1.6 km) north-west of the city centre]. Mont Lambert was appreciated by both sides as the defensive key to Boulogne. The 9th Brigade's early advance had been rapid but, once its defenders had recovered from the bombardments, they gave an effective defence with artillery and machine guns. Once paths had been cleared through minefields, however, support was available from Armoured Vehicle Royal Engineers (AVREs) and Churchill Crocodile flame-throwing tanks from the 79th Armoured Division and the tanks of the Fort Garry Horse. Much of Mont Lambert was in Canadian control by nightfall. La Tresorerie proved more difficult than expected (the attack was impeded in a minefield) but its artillery did not interfere with the main attacks.

=== 18 September ===
The guns at La Tresorerie were captured by the North Shore Regiment and the other two regiments in the 8th Brigade made progress in the suburbs and hills to the north of the city. The 9th Brigade's North Nova Scotias finally subdued Mont Lambert by 11:00, the loss of which General Heim believed "would make defence of the port impossible". The Glengarries, supported by AVREs, pushed beyond St Martin to the upper town or citadel. This area occupies a dominant position above the port and was (and still is) entirely surrounded by thick medieval masonry walls with a dry ditch in places. As the Canadians prepared to assault with the AVREs, a French civilian disclosed a secret passage and a platoon was taken beneath the walls. At the same time, tank fire and demolition of the gates persuaded the German defenders to surrender. A company of North Nova Scotias, supported by armour, broke through to the River Liane in the city centre and the reserve battalion, the Highland Light Infantry of Canada (HLI), moved through the Glengarries to the river. The bridges had been partially destroyed, preventing an immediate advance onto the western side. Later, the HLI stormed across, under the protection of heavy fire from all available weapons. Improvised repairs were made on one bridge overnight and by daylight, light transport was across the river.

=== 19 September ===
Once over the Liane, 9th Brigade moved south along the river's west bank and the Glengarries took the suburb of Outreau. The 9th Brigade was under heavy fire from a fortified position (code named Buttercup) on top of the peninsula between the river and the sea. Close co-ordination of the infantry advance and a creeping barrage enabled the strongpoint to be taken. The Divisional reserve, the Cameron Highlanders of Ottawa successfully completed their assault on Herquelingue heights, south-east of the city, east of the river, overnight on 18/19 September. A large German force had remained hidden in tunnels underneath the fortifications and had to be subdued separately on 20 September after making a nuisance of themselves (this was dubbed the bargain basement incident). In the northern area, 8th Brigade's North Shore Regiment moved against Wimille and the coastal settlement at Wimereux. The taking of the fortress of Fort de la Crèche was the responsibility of Queen's Own Rifles and the Chaudière. Fort de la Crèche was heavily defended and manned by some of the best troops available to General Heim. To protect Canadian activities elsewhere, it was shrouded by a smoke screen.

=== 20–21 September ===
The Nova Scotias had continued their advance along the river's west bank to capture St Etienne, opposite Herquelingue. They then crossed the peninsula and moved northwards to deal with the defended coastal areas of Nocquet, Ningles and Le Portel, while the Camerons crossed the Liane and covered the southern flank. In the northern area, Wimille was attacked by 8th Brigade and captured the following morning, against stiff opposition. The North Shore Regiment continued the actions north of Boulogne with an attack on the coastal town of Wimereux, 3 mi (4.8 km) north of Boulogne, restricting the use of artillery to minimize civilian casualties. Actions against Fort de la Crèche got under way with reconnaissance patrols by the Queen's Own Rifles and the Chaudière. These met with strong resistance but an attack by bombers from No 2 Group RAF subdued the defenders and reduced their will to fight.

=== 22 September ===
The capture of Wimereux was completed, to the relief of its population. The disheartened garrison of Fort de la Crèche surrendered to the Queen's Own Rifles after a brief action and bombardment before 08:00. The northern environs of Boulogne were now held by the Canadians. The last substantial resistance was at the two fortresses at Le Portel on the Outreau peninsula. An ultimatum calling for prompt surrender was delivered by loudspeakers and the northern fort's garrison marched out to surrender to the HLI shortly before the expiration of the ultimatum. This left the southern fort, where General Heim was quartered and which continued firing. Armour, including flame-throwers, was brought forward and the German garrison destroyed their guns; a cease-fire came into force at 16:17. At 16:30, Heim was reported as captured and en route to brigade headquarters. A solitary gun on the harbour breakwater continued firing until Heim ordered it to stop.

== Surrender ==
The German surrender was accepted by Canadian Brigadier John Meredith Rockingham.

== Aftermath ==
Once firing had stopped, civilian residents returned to recover their homes and the city rapidly returned to life. Canadian Civil Aid units provided soup kitchens, water and medical aid to the civilians. The port of Boulogne had to be cleared of wreckage, sunken ships and mines before it could be usable. The 8th Canadian and 9th Canadian Brigade were redeployed to Calais and the German heavy batteries at Cap Gris Nez. An Army Port Repair and Construction Group arrived to tackle the clearance work. On 10 October, an Operation Pluto oil pipeline was laid from Dungeness in England but the harbour was not open to shipping until 14 October. The added capacity of Boulogne was urgently needed by the Allies, for although the larger port of Antwerp had been captured, it was not useable until the approaches were cleared in the Battle of the Scheldt, which ended on 8 November; minesweeping in the Scheldt was completed on 28 November.

== Bibliography ==
- Chant, Christopher (1986). The Encyclopedia of Code Names of World War II. London: Routledge and Kegan Paul. ISBN 978-0-7102-0718-0.
- Copp, Terry (2006). Cinderella Army: the Canadians in Northwest Europe, 1944–1945. Toronto, Ont: University of Toronto Press. ISBN 978-0-8020-3925-5.
- Monahan, J. W. (1947). The Containing of Dunkirk (PDF). Canadian Participation in the Operations in North-west Europe 1944. Part V: Clearing the Channel Ports, 3 Sep 44 – 6 Feb 45 (Report). CMHQ Reports (184) (online scan ed.). Historical Section, Canadian Military Headquarters. OCLC 961860099. Archived from the original (PDF) on 19 July 2011.
- Shulman, Milton (1995). Defeat in the West. Chailey, East Sussex: Masquerade. ISBN 978-1-872947-03-7.
- Stacey, Colonel C. P.; Bond, Major C. C. J. (1960). The Victory Campaign: The operations in North-West Europe 1944–1945 (PDF). Official History of the Canadian Army in the Second World War. Vol. III. The Queen's Printer and Controller of Stationery Ottawa. OCLC 606015967. Archived from the original (PDF) on 21 December 2020.
- Wilmot, Chester (1997). The Struggle for Europe. Ware, Hertfordshire: Wordsworth Editions. ISBN 978-1-85326-677-5.
