= Douglas Gordon Cunningham =

Canadian lawyer and soldier

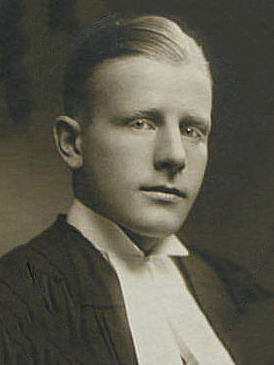
- Law Society of Upper Canada photo, 1933
- Born: 22 March 1908; Kingston, Ontario
- Died: 18 July 1992 (aged 84)
- Military career
- Allegiance: Canada
- Branch: Canadian Forces
- Service years: 1929–45
- Rank: Brigadier General
- Commands: Royal Military College of Canada (1944–45); 9th Canadian Infantry Brigade (1943–44)
- Awards: Commander of the Order of the British Empire; Distinguished Service Order; Efficiency Decoration; Canadian Forces' Decoration
- Other work: Lawyer

Brigadier General Douglas Gordon Cunningham, CBE, DSO, ED, CD, QC (22 March 1908 – 18 July 1992) was a Canadian lawyer and soldier.

== Early life ==
Cunningham was born in Kingston, Ontario. He was the son of Arthur Breden Cunningham and Kathleen (Gordon) Cunningham of Kingston. He was educated at Kingston Collegiate, Upper Canada College in Toronto, Ontario. He graduated from the Royal Military College of Canada in Kingston, Ontario in 1929. He studied at Osgoode Law School, University of Toronto, from 1930 to 1933, where he was a member of Kappa Alpha Society.

== Career ==
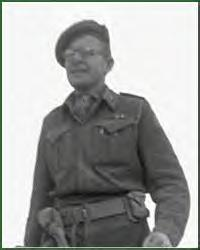
Brigadier Cunningham during World War II.

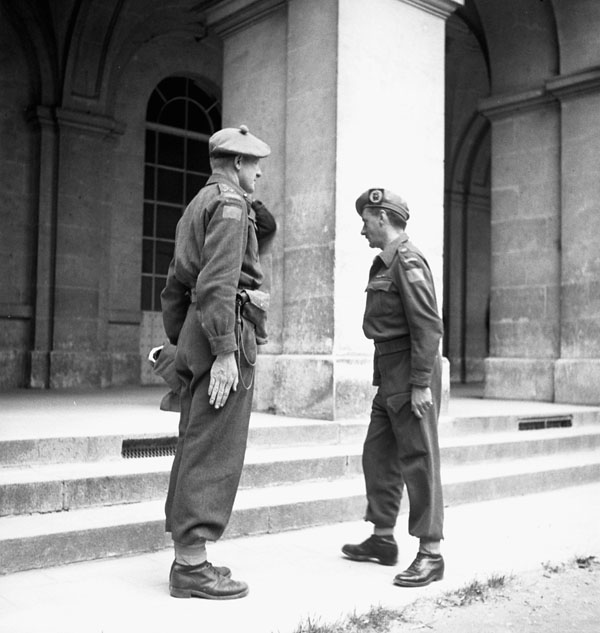
Brigade Major N. Kingsmill (left) presenting Brigadier D.G. Cunningham, who is relinquishing command of the 9th Canadian Infantry Brigade, with the first Canadian flag that was raised in Caen during the liberation of that city. Caen, France, 11 July 1944.

In 1933, he was called to the Bar of Ontario and he had a law practice in Kingston, Ontario. In November 1939, he married Isabelle Simpson, daughter of Mr. and Mrs. Huntington Simpson of Kingston. They had two sons and a daughter; John Douglas Cunningham, Ian Simpson, and Kathleen Elizabeth. In 1939, he also became an alderman of the City of Kingston.

He served as adjutant of The Princess of Wales' Own Regiment. He was brigade major of a Canadian infantry brigade which took part in the Dieppe Raid in 1942. He served as General Service Officer 1, I Canadian Corps in 1943. At the beginning of World War II, Captain Cunningham commanded the Camerons of Canada and as brigadier, commanded the 9th Canadian Infantry Brigade in 1944, landing on Juno Beach on D-Day. Described as “extraordinarily bright...meticulous” he was awarded the Distinguished Service Order for gallantry and distinguished services in the field of battle. He was also recognized by France with the Legion of Honour and the Croix de Guerre avec Palme. He returned to the Royal Military College of Canada as Commandant in 1944-5, but this was now a wartime training establishment.

After retiring from the military in 1945, he returned to his law practice and he was a director of several companies. In 1946, he was part of a deputation which interviewed the Minister of National Defence about the proposal not to reopen the Royal Military College of Canada. He was a member of a subcommittee of the Royal Military College of Canada Club which urged the reopening of the college. He served as president of the Royal Military College of Canada Club of Canada in 1946. In 1946 he was created King's Counsel which later became Queen's Counsel (QC) when Elizabeth II ascended to the throne. He died on 18 July 1992.

Military offices
Preceded by Halfdan Hertzberg	Commandant of the Royal Military College of Canada; 1944–1945	Succeeded by Desmond Smith
