= 25th Canadian Infantry Brigade =

Brigade of the Canadian Army

- Active: 1951–1955
- Disbanded: 1955, upon the end of the Korean War
- Country: Canada
- Allegiance: United Nations
- Branch: Canadian Army
- Type: Infantry brigade
- Size: 3 infantry battalions 2 armoured squadrons
- Part of: 1st Commonwealth Division
- Engagements: Korean War
- Battle honours: Korea 1951–1955

Commanders
- Notable commanders: Brig. J. M. Rockingham Brig. M.P. Bogart Brig. J.V. Allard

The 25th Canadian Infantry Brigade was Canada's primary combat-formation intending to be sent as part of the British Commonwealth Forces Korea. Originally composed of three infantry battalions and two armoured squadrons, several individual units rotated through the brigade. Although a full brigade had been trained and armed by 1951, the success of the Inchon Landing meant that only 2nd Battalion, Princess Patricia's Canadian Light Infantry (2 PPCLI) was initially sent. However, Chinese and North Korean forces subjected Canadian forces to fierce fighting throughout April 1951. 2 PPCLI earned a Presidential Unit Citation for their actions during the Battle of Kapyong while serving with the 27th British Commonwealth Brigade. It had detached from the 25th Brigade in order to leave for Korea in advance of the formation, and would later rejoin its Canadian brigade group.

== Formation ==
When North Korea invaded their southern neighbour on 25 June 1950, the UN Security Council authorized member-nations to "...furnish such assistance to the Republic of Korea as may be necessary to repel the armed attack and to restore international peace and security in the area". Although the United States sent immediate military aid to South Korea, Canada did not initially prepare to send ground forces to the country (although three Royal Canadian Navy destroyers were present for a majority of the campaign). On 7 August 1950, Canada's government authorized the creation of the "Canadian Army Special Force". Originally, it was to comprise an armoured regiment, and the 2nd Battalions of each of Canada's permanent-force infantry regiments – Princess Patricia's Canadian Light Infantry, Royal Canadian Regiment, and Royal 22^{e} Régiment – placed under the overall command of Brigadier-General J.M. Rockingham.

== Initial operations in Korea ==
Due to the massive success of the Inchon Landings, only the 2nd Battalion of Princess Patricia's was initially sent to Yokohama, and then onto Korea. By the time the transports arrived in Japan, however, the situation had changed significantly. China had sent substantial forces to the aid of North Korea, pushing UN-forces back into South Korea. As a result, the PPCLI was sent directly to the front lines, near Seoul, in mid–February. The first contact made with North Korean and Chinese forces came at the end of that month. In early March, United Nations forces initiated a counteroffensive against Chinese forces, while the Canadians moved into the Kapyong Valley near the 38th Parallel.

=== Battle of Kapyong ===
In April 1951, the Chinese People's Liberation Army launched a series of massive offensives across the Korean front, with the intention of recapturing Seoul. American and South Korean forces quickly began to retreat, with Canadian and Australian forces holding Kapyong Valley, preventing Chinese forces from overwhelming the UN in Korea.

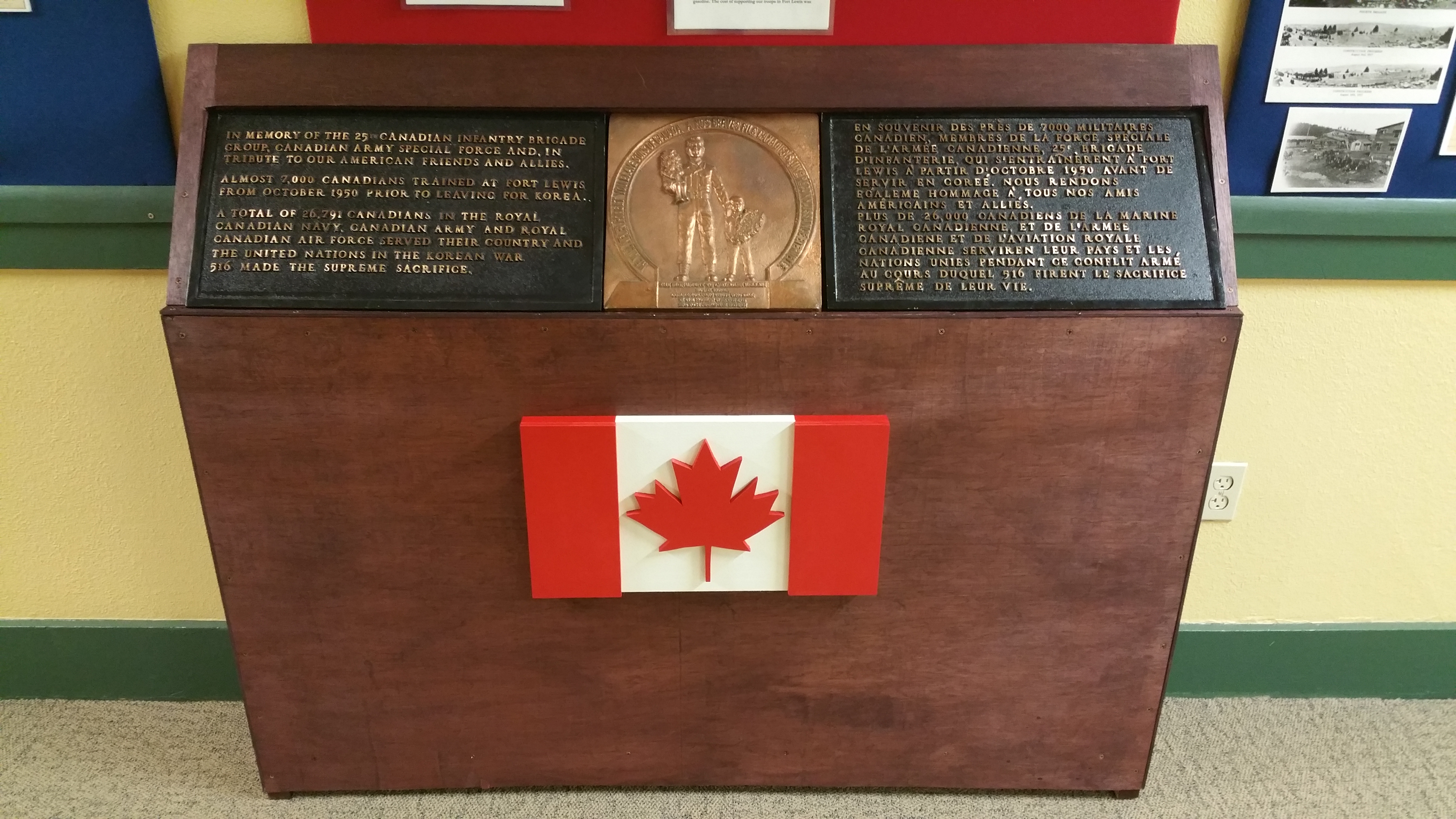
Memorial to the 25th Canadian Infantry Brigade at the Fort Lewis Military Museum.

== Order of battle ==
- 25th Canadian Infantry Brigade Brigade HQ
- 2nd Battalion, The Royal Canadian Regiment
- 2nd Battalion, Princess Patricia's Canadian Light Infantry
- 2nd Battalion, Royal 22^{e} Régiment
- C Squadron, Lord Strathcona's Horse (Royal Canadians) (2nd Armoured Regiment)
- 2nd Regiment, Royal Canadian Horse Artillery
- 57th Independent Field Squadron, Royal Canadian Engineers
- 25th Canadian Infantry Brigade Signal Troop
- No. 25 Canadian Infantry Brigade Ordnance Company
- No. 25 Canadian Field Ambulance
- No. 54 Canadian Transport Company and No. 38 Canadian Mobile Ambulance Company

Note: The 2nd Battalion, Princess Patricia's Canadian Light Infantry, was deployed in 1950. The brigade was deployed to Korea deployed in 1951 made up of the units listed here. Units were rotated as the war progressed. The Korean War Veterans' Associate (KVA) maintains a complete list of Canadian units both before and after the armistice.

== See also ==
- United Nations Memorial Cemetery, in Busan, Korea, where 378 Canadian soldiers are buried.
