= 10th (Royal Fusiliers) Medium Regiment, Royal Artillery =

The 10th (Royal Fusiliers) Medium Regiment, Royal Artillery, was a WW2 formed Medium Artillery regiment, enabled on 11 December 1942. The regiment was a conversion of the 16th Battalion, The Royal Fusiliers (City of London Regiment), which was part of 47th London Division. The conversion took place while the regiment was engaged in guarding the port and defences of Dover, Kent. The whole battalion moved to the North of England (Durham) and was joined by a number of OR's from the Royal Welsh Fusiliers, Gunnery Officers & NCO's from the regular army's 65th (Highland) Medium Regiment RA, to make up the War Establishment. The regiment was formed into two Batteries, 83 and 84, consisting of four 'Troops' (a/b and c/d), each with four guns - a total of 16 guns for the regiment.

The regiment subsequently came under command of the newly formed 9AGRA (Army Group Royal Artillery) along with:

- 9th Medium Regiment RA
- 11th Medium Regiment RA
- 107th Medium Regiment RA
- 146th Medium Regiment RA
- 738 Artillery Company RASC

9AGRA subsequently became the 21st Army Group AGRA in the NW Europe Campaign on its embarkation to France on 12 July 1944. On landing in Normandy, the regiment was placed under the command of 5AGRA, which was the British 30 Corps AGRA. On 14 August 1944, the regiment was returned to 9AGRA, with whom it fought its way through France, Belgium and Holland until 1 December 1944, when it was transferred to the 2nd Canadian AGRA as the replacement for the 15th Medium Regiment RA, which had been chosen to be converted back to Infantry. The 10th Medium Regiment supported the 3rd Canadian Infantry Division, 2nd Canadian Corps, throughout the campaign to take the Dutch, Long Left Flank of Holland in 1945 to The North Sea. Crossing the Rhine at Emmerich, the regiment supported the 2nd Canadian Corps until the end of the war in May 1945, when it was transferred back to 5 AGRA, 30 Corps. The Regiment was disbanded at Winsen, Germany on 15 April 1946.
