= 9th Canadian Infantry Brigade =

Brigade of the Canadian Army

9th Canadian Brigade 9th Canadian Infantry Brigade
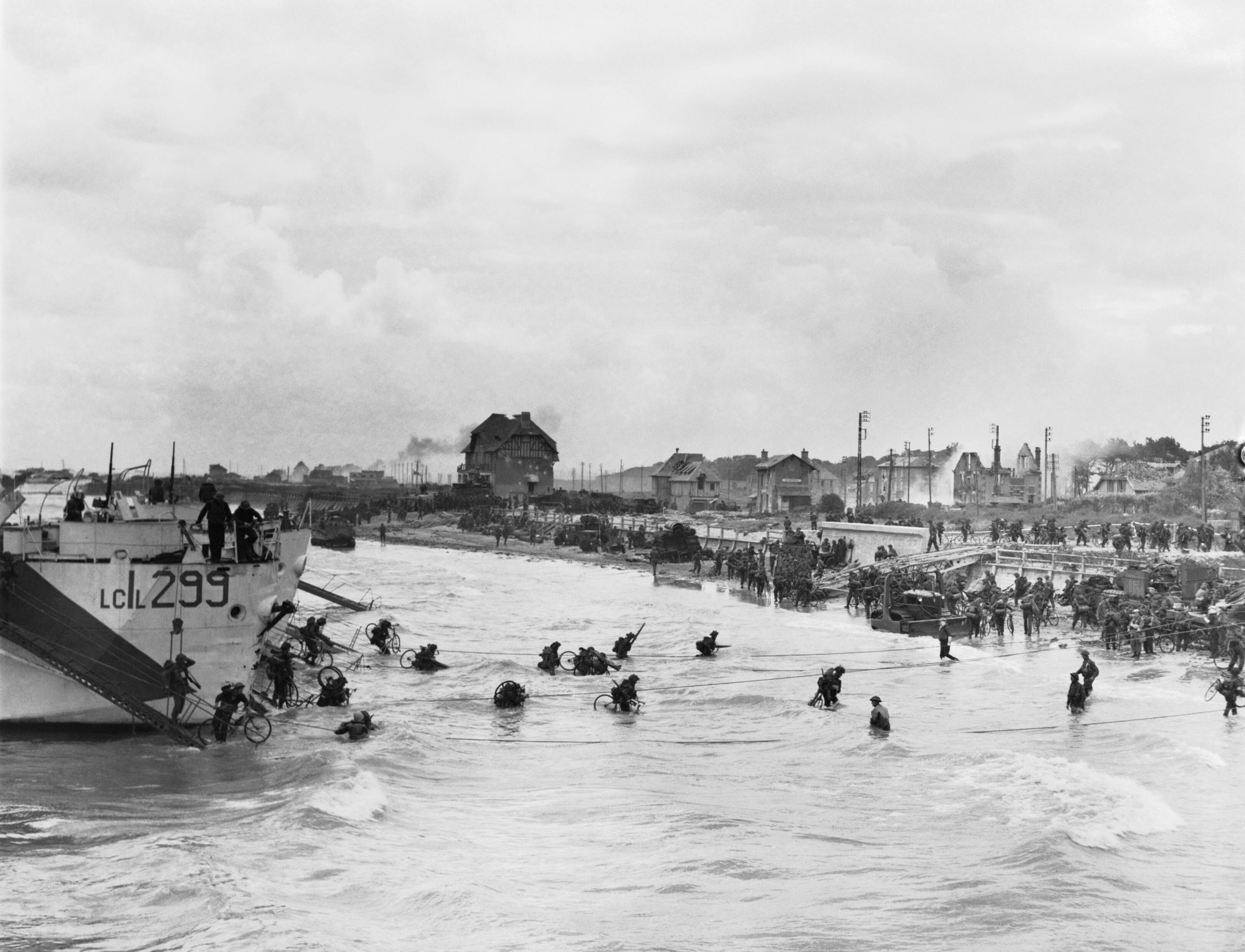
- 9th Canadian Infantry Brigade troops coming ashore at Juno Beach on D-Day, 6 June 1944
- Active: 1916–1918; 1940–1945
- Country: Canada
- Branch: (Canada) Canadian Army
- Type: Infantry
- Size: Brigade
- Part of: 3rd Canadian Division
- Engagements: World War I: Western Front; World War II: Normandy; North-West Europe

Commanders
- Notable commanders: Frederic William Hill; John Meredith Rockingham; Douglas Gordon Cunningham

The 9th Canadian Infantry Brigade was an infantry brigade of the Canadian Army that saw active service during World War I and World War II as part of the 3rd Canadian Infantry Division. The brigade fought on the Western Front during World War I from January 1916 to November 1918, and in Normandy and north-west Europe in 1944–1945 during World War II. It was a square formation of four infantry battalions during World War I, but was reduced to a triangular formation of three battalions during World War II.

== History ==
=== World War I ===
==== Formation ====
During World War I, the brigade was formed as part of the 3rd Canadian Division. Placed under the leadership of Brigadier-General Frederic William Hill, it initially consisted of the 43rd, 52nd, 58th and 60th Battalions, which came respectively from Winnipeg, Port Arthur, the Niagara area and Montreal. The unit sailed to France from Southampton late in February. Thereafter, it travelled to its billets in the vicinity of Eecke. The different battalions were then attached to other Canadian brigades already in the line, near Locre and Dranoutre, for trench familiarisation and training.

By late March 1916, the unit was complete, except for the divisional artillery, which would be available by the middle of July of the same year. In the meantime, as part of the 3rd Division, its artillery support was assured by the Indian 3rd (Lahore) Division. The unit spent the next months rotating in and out of trenches in the Ypres area, where other units of the Canadian Corps were located. It witnessed the German gas attacks at Hulluch and at Wulverghem, without taking part. In the last few days of May, the Brigade suffered casualties as a result of German artillery fire.

==== Battle of Mont Sorrel ====
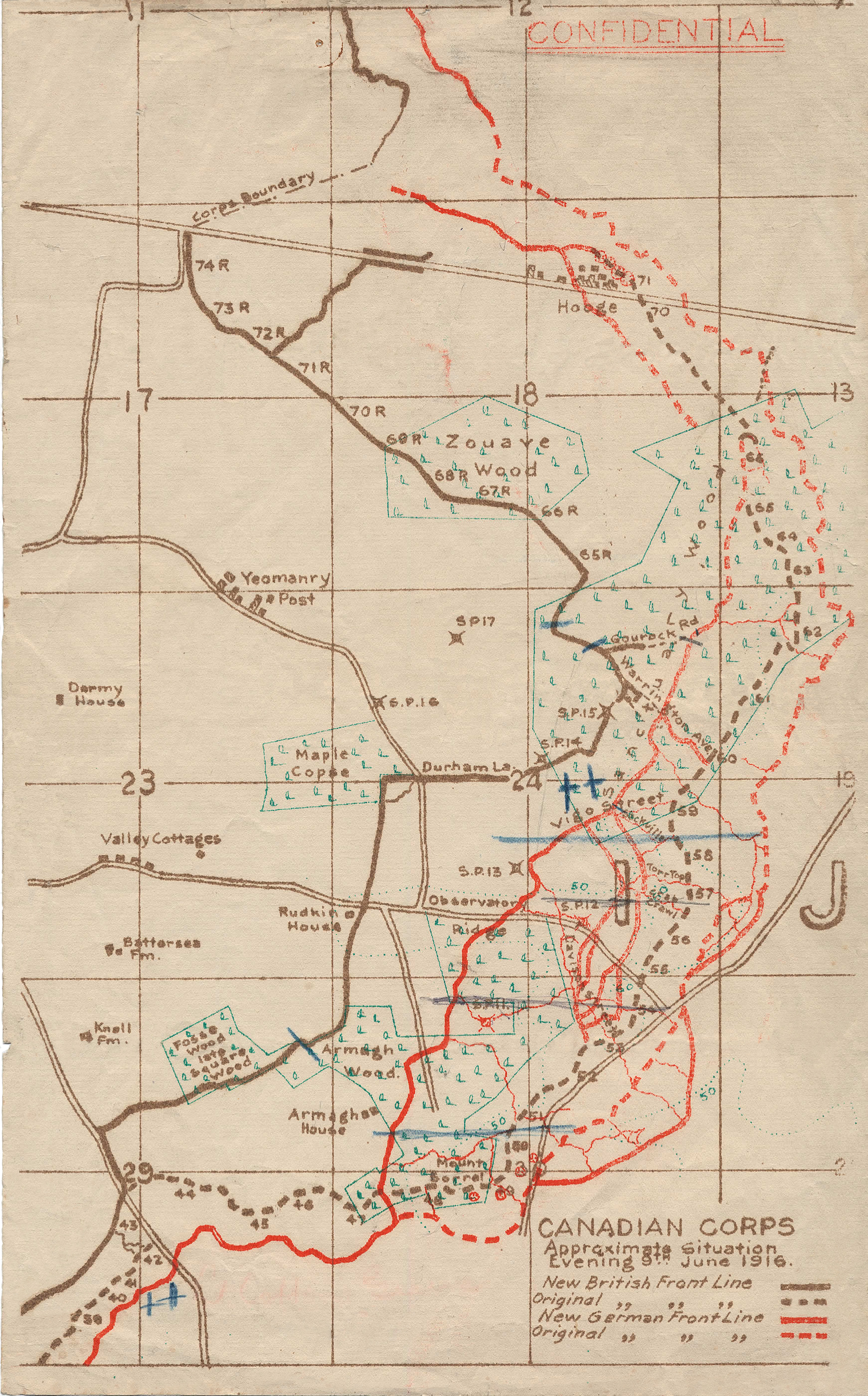
A map of the situation before and after the Battle of Mont Sorrel

Then, on June 2, the Germans launched an attack, in an attempt to divert Allied resources from the upcoming offensive in the Somme region and to gain a tactical advantage in the Ypres salient by capturing the only part of the Ypres ridge that was still in British hands. The brigade not being in the front line at the time of the attack, two battalions (the 52nd and the 60th) were ordered to strengthen the 7th Canadian Infantry Brigade. The brigade then relieved the 8th Canadian Infantry Brigade and parts of the 7th, which had borne the brunt of the German attack. From the 4th through to the 10th, no significant action happened except for repeated shelling and a German attack by about 100 men in the evening of the 4th on positions held by the 43rd battalion, which was repulsed. Further attempts, on the 10th and 11th, were again repulsed. On the night of the 12 and 13th, the Brigade's 58th Battalion participated in a counter-attack, in conjunction with other forces from the Canadian Corps, to attempt to recapture lost positions on the heights of Mont Sorrel and Tor Top. After prolonged artillery fire, the troops went over the top at 1:30 AM. Despite achieving objectives, the attack being described as an "unqualified success", the battalion nevertheless incurred 165 casualties. After the battle, the brigade was relieved by two battalions from the 2nd Guards Brigade on the night between the 15th and the 16th and moved behind the front line. In all, the brigade suffered 1083 casualties from June 2 to June 16.

== Order of battle ==
World War I

- 43rd (Cameron Highlanders) Battalion Canadian Infantry
- 52nd (North Ontario) Battalion Canadian Infantry
- 58th (Central Ontario) Battalion Canadian Infantry
- 60th (Victoria Rifles) Battalion Canadian Infantry (Disbanded 30 April 1917)
- 116th (Ontario County Infantry) Battalion Canadian Infantry (Raised in April 1917 – 11 November 1918)

World War II

- Headquarters, 9th Infantry Brigade, C.A.S.F.
- 1st Battalion, The Highland Light Infantry of Canada, C.A.S.F.
- 1st Battalion, The Stormont, Dundas and Glengarry Highlanders, C.A.S.F.
- 1st Battalion, The North Nova Scotia Highlanders, C.A.S.F.
- 9th Infantry Brigade Ground Defence Platoon (Lorne Scots), C.A.S.F. (Added 7 April 1941)
- 9th Infantry Anti-Tank Company, C.A.S.F. (Deleted 5 February 1941)

== Brigade Commanders during the Second World War ==
- Brigadier E.W. Haldenby: 14 September 1940 – 7 April 1943
- Brigadier T.G. Gibson: 8 April – 30 September 1943
- (Position Vacant / under Acting Command): 1 October – 24 November 1943
- Brigadier D.G. Cunningham: 25 November 1943 – 4 August 1944
- Brigadier J.M. Rockingham: 5 August 1944 – 4 June 1945
- (Position Vacant / under Acting Command): 5 June – 23 November 1945 (Disbanded)

== Bibliography ==
- Edmonds, J. E. (1932). Military Operations: France and Belgium, Sir Douglas Haig's Command to the 1st July: Battle of the Somme. History of the Great War based on Official Documents by Direction of the Committee of Imperial Defence. Vol. I. accompanying Appendices and Map Case (A. F. Becke) volume (1st ed.). London: Macmillan. OCLC 689489.
- Granatstein, J.L. (2011). Canada's army : waging war and keeping the peace (2nd ed.). Toronto: University of Toronto Press. ISBN 978-1-4426-1178-8.
- Hill, F.W. (1916). War diaries - 9th Canadian Infantry Brigade. Library and Archives Canada.
- Nicholson, Gerald W. L. (1962). Canadian Expeditionary Force 1914–1919 (PDF). Official History of the Canadian Army in the First World War. Ottawa: Queen's Printer and Controller of Stationery. OCLC 557523890. Archived from the original (PDF) on 26 August 2011.
