= Hampshire Brigade =

Portsmouth Brigade Hampshire Brigade 128th (Hampshire) Brigade 128th Infantry Brigade
- Active: 1889–1919; 1920–1946; 1947–?
- Country: United Kingdom
- Branch: Volunteer Force/Territorial Force/Territorial Army
- Type: Infantry
- Size: Brigade
- Part of: 43rd (Wessex) Infantry Division; 46th Infantry Division
- Garrison/HQ: Netley Castle; Southampton
- Engagements: Second World War

Commanders
- Notable commanders: Oliver Nugent; Frederick Browning; Manley Angell James; Douglas Kendrew

The Hampshire Brigade, previously the Portsmouth Brigade and later 128th (Hampshire) Brigade, was an infantry formation of the British Army of the Volunteer Force, Territorial Force (TF) and Territorial Army (TA) in existence from 1889 until after the Second World War. It served in British India during the First World War, but not as a complete formation. During the Second World War, the 128th Infantry Brigade fought in the Tunisian campaign, in the Italian Campaign, and later in the Greek Civil War. The brigade was composed entirely of battalions from the Hampshire Regiment (later Royal Hampshire Regiment).

== Volunteer Brigade ==
The Stanhope Memorandum of December 1888 proposed a comprehensive Mobilisation Scheme for units of the Volunteer Force, which would assemble in their own brigades at key points in case of war. In peacetime these brigades provided a structure for collective training. Under this scheme four of the five Volunteer Battalions (VBs) of the Hampshire Regiment formed the Portsmouth Brigade (the 4th VB was initially in the Portland Brigade, but joined after that formation was disbanded in the early1890s):

- Headquarters at 84 Piccadilly, London,
- 1st Volunteer Battalion, Hampshire Regiment – Winchester
- 2nd Volunteer Battalion, Hampshire Regiment – Southampton
- 3rd (Duke of Connaught's Own) Volunteer Battalion, Hampshire Regiment – Portsmouth
- 4th Volunteer Battalion, Hampshire Regiment
- 5th (Isle of Wight, 'Princess Beatrice's') Volunteer Battalion, Hampshire Regiment – Newport, Isle of Wight
- Supply Detachment (later termed an Army Service Corps (ASC) Company)
- Bearer Company (later Royal Army Medical Corps)

The first brigade commander was Colonel Sir William Humphery, 1st Baronet, formerly commanding officer of the 1st VB, appointed 26 January 1889. He was succeeded by Col the Hon Henry Crichton, retired from the 21st Hussars, who moved the brigade HQ to his home at Netley Castle.

The volunteer brigades were extensively reorganised in 1902 but the Portsmouth Brigade was unchanged, apart from being retitled the Hampshire Brigade. Colonel Crichton was knighted (KCB) in 1911 after he retired from the command.

== Territorial Force ==
Under the Haldane Reforms the Volunteer Force was subsumed into the Territorial Force (TF), the volunteer battalions becoming numbered battalions of their parent units. The TF also introduced higher formations, the Hampshire Brigade now forming part of the Wessex Division. TF brigades now adiopted a standard four-battalion establishment, so the 8th (Isle of Wight Rifles, 'Princess Beatrice's) Bn remained unattached under the orders of Southern Command, allocated to 'Southern and South Western Coast Defences'. The composition of the brigade on the outbreak of the First World War was therefore:

- Bde HQ – 30 Carlton Place, Southampton
- 4th Bn, Hampshire Regiment – Winchester
- 5th Bn, Hampshire Regiment – Southampton
- 6th (Duke of Connaught's Own) Bn, Hampshire Regiment – Portsmouth
- 7th Bn, Hampshire Regiment – Bournemouth
- No 4 (Hampshire) Section, Wessex Divisional Signal Company, Royal Engineers
- Hampshire Brigade Company, ASC, at Drill Hall, Redan Hill, Aldershot

== First World War ==
On 29 July 1914, the Wessex Division was on Salisbury Plain carrying out its annual training camp when 'precautionary orders' were received, and next day the division took up emergency war stations in Somerset, Devon and Cornwall. The order to mobilise arrived on the evening of 4 August. Between 10 and 13 August the division concentrated on Salisbury Plain and began war training.

On the outbreak of war, TF units were invited to volunteer for Overseas Service and on 15 August the War Office issued instructions to separate those men who had signed up for Home Service only, and form these into reserve units. On 31 August, the formation of a reserve or 2nd Line unit was authorised for each 1st Line unit where 60 per cent or more of the men had volunteered for Overseas Service. The titles of these 2nd Line units would be the same as the original, but distinguished by a '2/' prefix. In this way duplicate battalions, brigades and divisions were created, mirroring those TF formations being sent overseas.

On 24 September, at the special request of the Secretary of State for War, Earl Kitchener of Khartoum, the Wessex Division accepted liability for service in British India to relieve the Regular units there for service on the Western Front. The division's infantry battalions (without their brigade headquarters) embarked at Southampton on 8 October and then were convoyed to Bombay. They were immediately distributed to garrisons across India, reverting to peacetime service conditions, and the Hampshire Brigade never saw service as a whole, though it was formally numbered the 128th (Hampshire) Brigade in May 1915. (The 1st Welsh Brigade, raised for 'Kitchener's Army' by the Welsh National Executive Committee and comprising four service battalions of the Royal Welsh Fusiliers, had received the number '128th' on 10 December 1914, but it had been renumbered 113th Infantry Brigade on 27 April 1915.)

As soon as the Wessex Division had left for India, the 2nd Wessex Division and its brigades began to be organised from the 2nd Line battalions being raised by the home depots. Recruitment and training of the 2nd Wessex Division proceeded so well that it was also sent to India in December 1914, and later received the notional titles of 45th (2nd Wessex) Division and 134th (2/1st Hampshire) Brigade. Brigadier General George Harvey Nicholson, who had succeeded Colonel Oliver Nugent in command of the Hampshire Brigade since 14 February 1914, took temporary command of the 2/1st Hampshire Brigade on its formation and went out to India in command of the 2nd Line troops before returning to the UK.

By early 1915 the need was growing for troops to be sent from India to various theatres of war, and the first drafts and formed units from the Wessex Divisions began to go on active service, particularly to the Mesopotamian Front. By the end of the war only one battalion remained in India from the two Hampshire brigades.

=== Order of battle ===
The brigade's composition was as follows:

- 1/4th Bn, Hampshire Regiment – went to Mesopotamia 17 March 1915 with 33rd Brigade, 12th Indian Division
- 1/5th Bn, Hampshire Regiment – served in India throughout the war; served in Third Anglo-Afghan War
- 1/6th (DoCO) Bn, Hampshire Regiment – went to Mesopotamia 18 September 1917 with 52nd Brigade, 15th Indian Division
- 1/7th Bn, Hampshire Regiment – went to Aden 8 January 1918

=== Insignia ===
By July 1917 the three remaining battalions of the brigade were wearing yellow and black flashes on the left side of the pagri on their foreign service helmets (the colours yellow and black were often adopted by battalions of the 'Hampshire Tigers'). These were: 1/5th Hants: triangle vertically bisected, with a red figure 5 superimposed; 1/6th Hants: square vertically bisected; 1/7th Hants: square diagonally bisected, black over yellow (the same flash was worn by 2/7th Hants of 134th Bde). At one point members of 1/5th Hants also wore a black square with '5 HANTS' embroidered in gilt wire. 43rd (Wessex) Division had no formation sign during World War I.

== Interwar ==
The Territorial Force was disbanded shortly after the war ended but reformed in the 1920s as the Territorial Army. The brigade was reformed in the Territorial Army, as the 128th (Hampshire) Infantry Brigade, in 1920 and was again part of the 43rd Division and again included four battalions of the Hampshire Regiment.

However, the composition of the brigade changed over the years. The 5th and 7th battalions were merged in 1923 to become the 5th/7th Battalion, Hampshire Regiment They were replaced in the brigade by the 8th (Isle of Wight Rifles) Battalion, Hampshire Regiment.

In 1937 the 8th (Isle of Wight Rifles) Battalion was converted to the Royal Artillery role as The Princess Beatrice's (Isle of Wight Rifles) Heavy Regiment. The following year, in 1938, all infantry brigades of the British Army were reduced from four infantry battalions to three. As a consequence of this, the 6th (Duke of Connaught's Own) Battalion, Hampshire Regiment was, like the 8th Battalion, transferred to the Royal Artillery and redesignated the 59th (Duke of Connaught's Hampshire) Anti-Tank Regiment, Royal Artillery and became the anti-tank regiment for the 43rd Division. They were replaced in the brigade by the 4th Battalion, Dorset Regiment, originally from the 129th (South Western) Infantry Brigade. The brigade, shortly afterwards, was redesignated the 128th Infantry Brigade.

In the spring and summer of 1939 the Territorial Army was doubled in size and all units were ordered to form a duplicate unit and the 4th Battalion was split in two, to create the 1/4th and 2/4th battalions and 5th/7th Battalion was split into the 5th and 7th battalions. However, unlike, most Territorial divisions which formed an exact 'mirror' duplicate of 2nd Line units, the 43rd (Wessex) was instead split on a geographical basis. The units from Dorset, Wiltshire and Hampshire remained with the 43rd Division and units from Devonshire, Somerset and Cornwall joined the 45th Infantry Division. Therefore, the newly raised 7th Hampshire Regiment and the 4th Dorset Regiment were both transferred to the 130th Infantry Brigade. The 128th Brigade kept the 1/4th and 5th Hampshires, two 1st Line units, and the 2/4th Battalion, a 2nd Line unit.

== Second World War ==
During the Second World War, the 128th Brigade was mobilised in September 1939, soon after the outbreak of war. The brigade continued to serve with the 43rd Division and was preparing to go overseas to the Franco-Belgian border to join the British Expeditionary Force (BEF). The brigade was at the time commanded by Brigadier Frederick Browning, a Regular Army officer of the Grenadier Guards. However, the BEF's retreat and evacuation from Dunkirk during the Battle of France cancelled these plans and the division instead remained in Kent on the defensive and prepared for a potential German invasion of England.

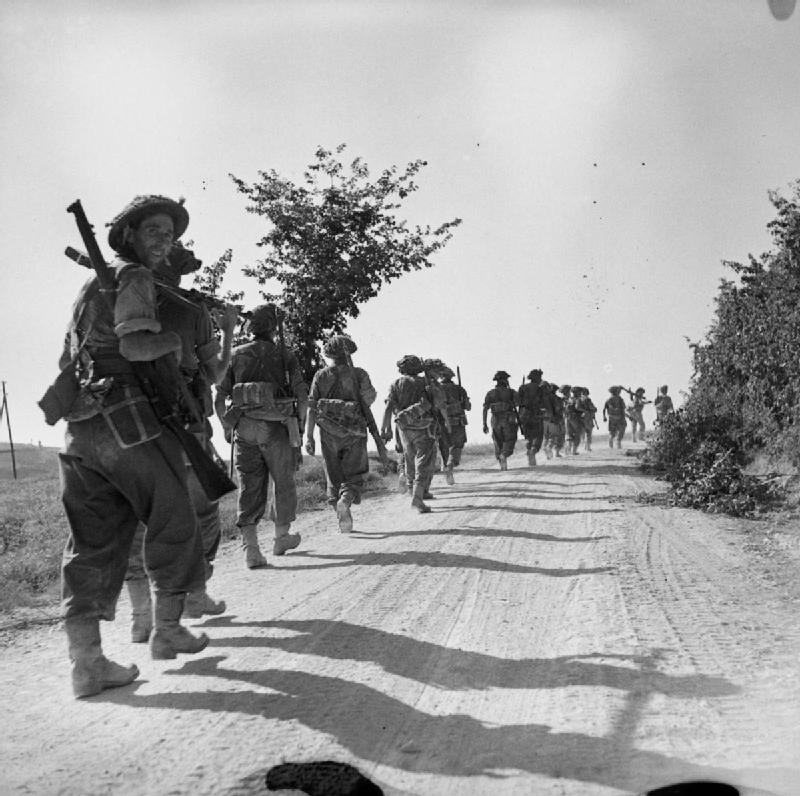
Men of the 2nd Battalion, Hampshire Regiment move up to their last objective before the Gothic Line, Italy, 27 August 1944.

On 6 June 1942 the 43rd (Wessex) Division was reorganised as a 'Mixed Division' and 34th Tank Brigade arrived to replace the 128th Infantry. The brigade was, therefore, transferred to the 46th Infantry Division on 15 August, and would remain with the division for the rest of the war. The 128th Brigade remained with the 46th for the rest of the war. With this division the brigade served in Operation Torch, the Allied invasion of North Africa. It then bore the brunt of a German offensive, Operation Ochsenkopf, in Northern Tunisia during the spring of 1943. After the Axis surrender in May 1943, it then went on to fight in the Italian Campaign from September 1943 until late 1944, when it was then deployed to Greece to help calm the Greek Civil War.

The 128th Infantry Brigade fought in many battles in Italy including the Salerno landings in September 1943, Naples, and at the Gothic Line. It ended the war in Austria.

=== Order of battle ===
128 Brigade had the following composition during the war:

- 1/4th Battalion, Hampshire Regiment
- 5th Battalion, Hampshire Regiment
- 2/4th Battalion, Hampshire Regiment (until 9 May 1943)
- 128th Infantry Brigade Anti-Tank Company (formed 19 May 1940, disbanded 20 December 1941)
- 2nd Battalion, Hampshire Regiment (from 10 May 1943)

== Postwar ==
When the TA was reconstituted on 1 January 1947, 128 Bde was reformed in 43 Division with the following composition and so was no longer a solely Hampshire formation:

- 4th Bn Royal Hampshire Regiment – Winchester
- 4th Bn Oxfordshire and Buckinghamshire Light Infantry – Oxford
- 4th/6th Bn Royal Berkshire Regiment – Reading, Berkshire

The brigade appears to have been finally disbanded in the 1960s.

== Commanders ==
The following officers commanded the Portsmouth/Hampshire Brigade:

- Col Sir William Humphery, 1st Bt, 26 January 1889
- Col Hon H.G.L. Crichton, Reserve of Officers, 9 May 1895, until 1911
- Col G.H. Nicholson, 14 February 1914 (promoted Brig-Gen on outbreak of war)

The following officers commanded 128th Brigade during the Second World War:

- Brigadier E.D.H. Tollemache (until 31 October 1939)
- Brigadier C.H. Woodhouse (from 31 October 1939 until 19 April 1940)
- Lieutenant-Colonel A.L. Scaife (Acting, from 19 to 28 April 1940)
- Brigadier R.F.H. Massy-Westrop (from 28 April until 14 May 1940)
- Brigadier F.A.M Browning (from 14 May 1940 until 20 February 1941)
- Brigadier M.A. James VC (from 20 February 1941 until 21 May 1943)
- Lieutenant-Colonel H.C.C. Newnham (Acting, from 21 May until 10 June 1943)
- Brigadier M.A. James VC (from 10 June until 20 September 1943)
- Brigadier J.L. Spencer (from 20 September until 5 November 1943)
- Lieutenant-Colonel R. Chandler (Acting, from 5 to 14 November 1943)
- Brigadier T.P.D. Scott (from 14 November 1943 until 24 January 1944)
- Brigadier D.A. Kendrew (from 24 January until 8 December 1944)
- Lieutenant-Colonel J.H.H. Robinson (Acting, from 8 December 1944 until 28 January 1945)
- Brigadier D.A. Kendrew (from 28 January 1945)

== Victoria Cross recipients ==
- Captain Richard Wakeford, 2/4th Battalion, Hampshire Regiment, Second World War
- Lieutenant Gerard Ross Norton, 1/4th Battalion, Hampshire Regiment, Second World War

== See also ==
- 134th (2/1st Hampshire) Brigade for the 2nd Line formation
- British infantry brigades of the First World War
- British brigades of the Second World War
