= 43rd (Wessex) Signal Regiment =

Wessex Divisional Telegraph Company 43rd (Wessex) Divisional Signals 43 (Wessex) Signal Regiment 43 (Wessex and City & County of Bristol) Signal Squadron
- Badge of the Royal Corps of Signals
- Active: 1860–present
- Country: United Kingdom
- Branch: Territorial Army
- Role: Signals
- Part of: 43rd (Wessex) Division; 45th Division; 37 (Wessex and Welsh) Signal Regiment; 21 (Air Support) Signal Regiment; 39 (Skinners) Signal Regiment
- Garrison/HQ: Exeter (1920–45); Taunton (1947–67); Bridgwater (1967–2012); Bath (2012–)
- Engagements: World War I: Western Front; Salonika; World War II: Operation Jupiter; Operation Bluecoat; Vernon Bridge; Operation Market Garden; Operation Clipper; Operation Blackcock; Operation Veritable; Operation Plunder

Commanders
- Honorary Colonel: D. M. Sharkey
- Notable commanders: Maj-Gen Sir Godwin Michelmore

43 (Wessex) Signal Regiment was a Territorial Army (TA) unit of the British Army's Royal Corps of Signals from 1920. It had its origins in a Volunteer unit of the Royal Engineers formed in the West Country in 1860 and provided the communications for the 43rd (Wessex) Infantry Division during World War II. Its successor still serves as a squadron in today's Army Reserve.

== Origin ==
This unit originated as part of the 1st Devonshire and Somersetshire Royal Engineers (Volunteers) formed in 1860. When the Volunteers were subsumed into the Territorial Force as part of the Haldane reforms in 1908, the Devonshire and Somersetshire unit was split up: most of the Devonshire personnel went to form the Devonshire Fortress Royal Engineers at Plymouth, while the Somerset contingent provided the Wessex Divisional Engineers at Bath and Weston-super-Mare. The Wessex Divisional Telegraph Company was part of the Divisional RE but was based separately at Exeter in Devonshire, with the following organisation:

Wessex Divisional Telegraph Company

- HQ and No 1 Section at The Priory, Colleton Crescent, Exeter
- No 2 (Devon and Cornwall) Section attached to the Devon and Cornwall Brigade
- No 3 (South Western) Section attached to the South Western Brigade
- No 4 (Hampshire) Section attached to the Hampshire Brigade

Nos 2–4 Sections were largely manned by infantry from the brigades to which they were attached. The divisional telegraph companies were termed signal companies from 1910.

== World War I ==
On 29 July 1914, the Wessex Division was on Salisbury Plain carrying out its annual training camp when 'precautionary orders' were received, and next day the division took up emergency war stations in Somerset, Devon and Cornwall. The order to mobilise arrived on the evening of 4 August. Between 10 and 13 August, the division concentrated on Salisbury Plain, with divisional HQ moving from Exeter to Tidworth, to begin war training. On 24 September, at the special request of the Secretary of State for War, Earl Kitchener of Khartoum, the Wessex Division accepted liability for service in British India to relieve the Regular Army units there to go to the Western Front. The division's infantry and artillery embarked on 8 October and reached India in November. The engineers, transport, and other support units remained in the UK. The Wessex Division never saw service as a whole, though it was formally numbered the 43rd (1st Wessex) Division in 1915. As soon as the Wessex Division had left for India, the home depots began raising 2nd Line units, distinguished from the 1st Line by a '2/' prefix. Recruitment and training of the 2nd Wessex Division proceeded so well that it was also sent to India in December 1914, and later received the notional title of 45th (2nd Wessex) Division. Once again, the RE and support units were left behind in the UK.

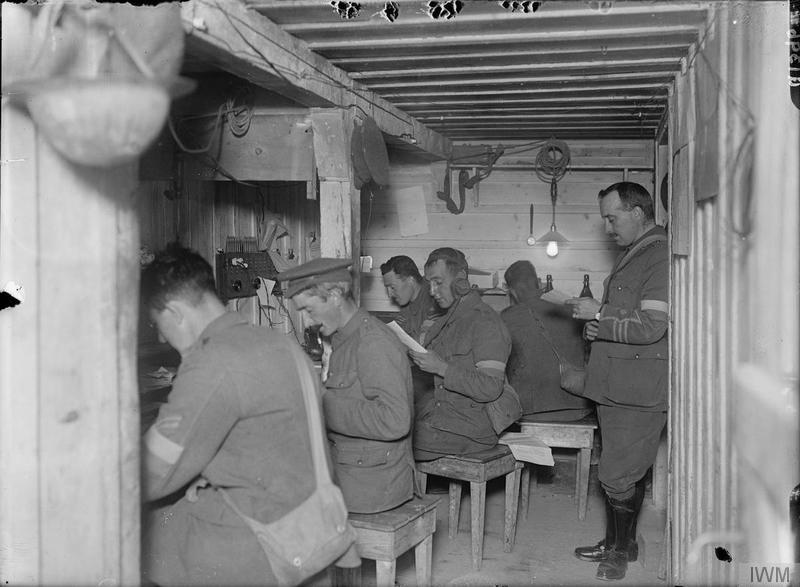
RE Signal Company at work on the Western Front.

On 20 November 1914, the 1st Wessex Divisional RE joined 27th Division, which was being assembled mainly from the Regular Army units returning from Indian garrisons. The signallers became 27th (Wessex) Divisional Signal Company and went to France in December 1914, the first complete TF signal company sent to the Western Front. 27th Division served on the Western Front for almost a year, taking part in the Second Battle of Ypres. On 17 November the division embarked from Marseille for the Macedonian front.

Apart from some raiding, 27th Division's only offensive actions were from 30 September to 4 October 1916 when it attacked across the River Struma to capture some villages, and some failed attacks on Tumbitza Farm in November and December. Little happened on the British part of the Macedonian front. 27th Division spent almost two years in the malarial Struma Valley, the only significant action occurring when the division took part in the capture of Homondos on 14 October. The front became active again in September 1918 when the Allies began the final offensive and 27th Division was engaged in the capture of the Roche Noire Salient, followed by the passage of the Vardar and pursuit to the Strumica, Valley. After the Armistice of Salonica ended hostilities on the Macedonian front, 27th Division embarked for the Black Sea in December 1918, reaching Batum by the end of January. The force was part of the British intervention in the complex situation of independent regimes that had emerged in the Caucasus region following the collapse of the Russian and Ottoman Turkish empires. Detachments of the division were scattered across the Azerbaijan Democratic Republic, Democratic Republic of Georgia and First Republic of Armenia. British troops began to withdraw in August 1919 and 27th Division was disbanded between 7 and 24 September after handing over to an Inter-Allied force at Batum.

The 2/1st Wessex Divisional RE joined 58th (2/1st London) Division, the signallers becoming 58th (2/1st Wessex) Divisional Signal Company, and went with it to the Western Front in January 1917. It was engaged in the operations during the German retreat to the Hindenburg Line (Operation Alberich) and in the Third Battle of Ypres. The division was heavily engaged in the German spring offensive of 1918 and then the Allied Hundred Days Offensive, beginning with the Battle of Amiens, in which the division was engaged in bitter fighting for the Chipilly spur. During the final advance, the division also distinguished itself at the Battle of Épehy. Demobilisation began after the Armistice with Germany in November 1918, and by March 1919 the various HQs of the diminishing division were merged into a single division group. The last units left France at the end of June 1919.

== Interwar ==
In 1920, the RE Signal Service became the independent Royal Corps of Signals (RCS). The 43rd (Wessex) Divisional Signals (Note: Divisional signal units of the Royal Signals 1920–45 were battalion-sized and commanded by a Major or Lieutenant-Colonel; they were not termed 'regiments' until 1946.) reformed at The Priory, The Friars, Exeter, in the Territorial Army (TA), which replaced the TF in 1921. The unit was commanded by Major (later Lt-Col) Godwin Michelmore, and recruited from Exeter, Plymouth, Southampton and Salisbury. It also administered a number of other TA signal units in its divisional area:

- 223rd Field Artillery Signal Section at 2 Redcliffe Parade, Bedminster, Bristol, later Southampton
- 224th Field Artillery Signal Section at Hamilton House, Connaught Road, Southampton
- 228th Field Artillery Signal Section at The Priory, The Friars, Exeter
- 250th Light Anti-Aircraft Regiment Signal Section at Exeter, forming 1939

Willey's Cadet Company of the Devonshire (Fortress) RE was also affiliated to the unit.

== World War II ==
=== Mobilisation ===
When the TA was doubled in size in early 1939 after the Munich Crisis, the division once again formed a duplicate, 45th Division, for which the signals split to form 45th (West Country) Divisional Signals under the command of Lt-Col A.F.S. Fane, previously commanding officer (CO) of 43rd Divisional Signals.

=== Organisation ===
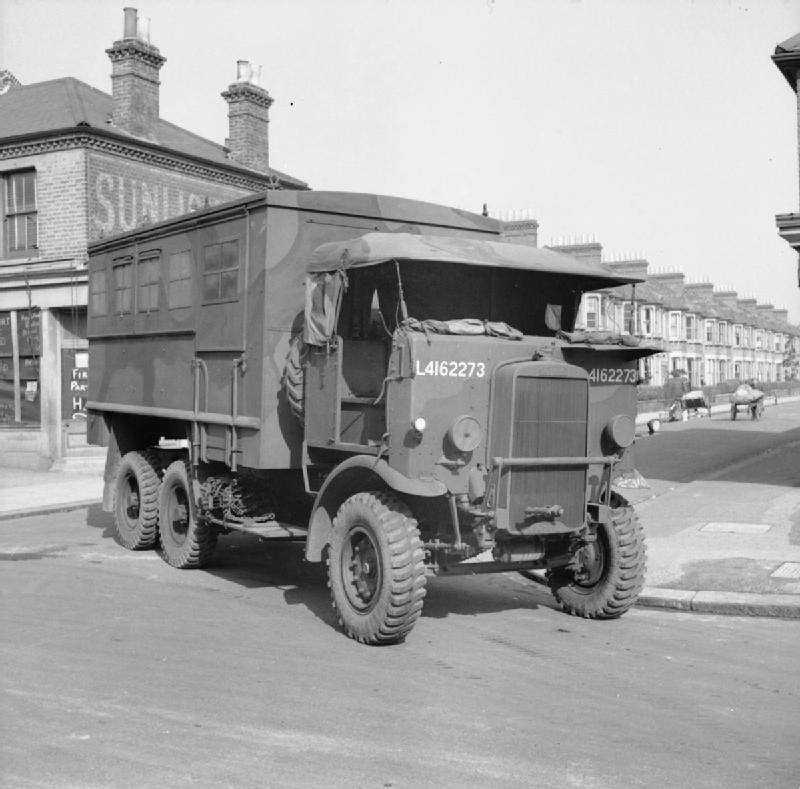
Leyland Retriever wireless lorry, 1941.

In 1939, the organisation of an infantry divisional signal unit and the attachments of its subunits were as follows:

- HQ Company
  - Q Section – quartermasters
  - M Section – maintenance
- No 1 Company – Divisional HQ
  - A & C Sections – wireless
  - B Section – cable
  - D Section – despatch riders and cipher section
  - O Section – operating
- No 2 Company – divisional artillery
  - E, F & G Sections – individual artillery regiments
  - H Section – HQ divisional artillery
- No 3 Company – infantry brigades, reconnaissance and RE
  - R Section – reconnaissance battalion
  - J, K & L Sections – individual infantry brigades

When there was an attached army tank brigade:

- No 4 Company
  - W Section – army tank brigade
  - X, Y & Z Sections – individual tank regiments

As the war progressed, divisional signals was enlarged to cover the divisional radio telephony (R/T) and wireless telephony (W/T) nets, divisional administrative services, rear communications for brigade HQs, divisional tactical HQ, and air communications.

=== 43rd (Wessex) Divisional Signals ===
==== Home Defence ====
43rd (Wessex) Division's Wyvern formation badge adopted in 1935.

The TA was mobilised on the outbreak of war and 43rd (Wessex) Division began training in its home area. It was intended to reinforce the British Expeditionary Force (BEF) in France, but the German invasion of the Low Countries on 10 May ended the 'Phoney War' before the division was ready. When the Battle of France was lost and the BEF was being evacuated from Dunkirk, 43rd (W) Division was one of the few reasonably well-equipped formations left in Home Forces. It formed part of the mobile GHQ Reserve disposed on the line from Northampton through North London to Aldershot, from which brigade groups could be despatched to any threatened area. During the period when invasion was most threatened, the division was stationed just north of London.

By the end of 1940, the division was stationed under XII Corps in East Kent, where it remained for the next four years, first in defensive mode, later training intensively. It was later noted that its habitual training area round Stone Street, outside Folkestone, bore a marked resemblance to the Bocage countryside in Normandy where it would later fight. Signals exercises to practise all HQs and staffs were frequent. The divisional commander, Maj-Gen Ivor Thomas, was often heard over the radio net: 'He had a voice which seemed able to blast its way through interference from wireless programmes, Fighter Command operations, other formations' activities, and even the worst splutterings and explosions of the wireless sets of the period'. The divisional history stresses the high level of efficiency achieved by the divisional signals during this long period of hard training.

In June 1942, the division was reorganised as a 'Mixed' division, first 25th and later 34th Army Tank Brigade replacing one of the infantry brigades, with the consequent reorganisation of the signals units. This organisation was abandoned in September 1943 when the third infantry brigade was reinstated.

==== Operation Overlord ====
XII Corps and 43rd (W) Division was assigned to 21st Army Group for the Allied invasion of Normandy (Operation Overlord). They were follow-up formations, with 43rd (W) Division scheduled to complete its landings 14 days after D Day (D +14, 20 June). However, shipping delays and a storm between 19 and 22 June delayed its arrival; the division finally concentrated round Bayeux on 24 June. Its first action, Operation Epsom starting on 26 June, involved following 15th (Scottish) Division's advance and securing the captured objectives, which included some heavy fighting against a Panzer counter-attack at Cheux. The division later captured Mouen, then dug in to defend the bridgehead over the River Odon against counter-attacks.

==== Hill 112 ====
The division's first major offensive action was Operation Jupiter, to take Hill 112, which had been briefly captured by British armour during 'Epsom' but had to be abandoned. The attack on 10 July involved bitter fighting and heavy casualties, and was only partially successful, with the hilltop left in No man's land. The division had to complete its capture and then hold the vital position against heavy bombardment and counter-attacks for another 14 days, including Operation Express to capture Maltot on 22 July.

At the end of July, 21 Army Group was regrouped for the breakout from the Normandy beachhead and after rest 43rd (W) Division moved to XXX Corps to launch an attack on Mont Pinçon (Operation Bluecoat). Signals inter-communication had to be set up with 8th Armoured Brigade, which was assigned to support the infantry. After hard fighting, the infantry and tanks succeeded in taking the dominating height by surprise. The breakout achieved, XXX Corps drove for the River Seine, where 43rd (W) Division made an assault crossing and then bridged the river at Vernon.

==== Arnhem ====
After the Seine crossing, 43rd (W) Division was 'grounded' while the rest of XXX Corps raced ahead. It then moved up to Diest to take part in XXX Corps' thrust to link up the bridges seized by airborne forces during Operation Market Garden, beginning on 17 September. The division was to follow Guards Armoured Division, carrying out assault crossings if any of the bridges were found to be destroyed, and to guard the 'corridor' to Arnhem. The advance up the only road ('Club Route') was slow but on 21 September 43rd (W) Division caught up with the Guards and took over responsibility for defending the Nijmegen bridges. By the time the division broke through to join the Polish Parachute Brigade on the banks of the Nederrijn next day, 1st Airborne Division had been effectively destroyed. All the Wessex could do was make an assault crossing in order to ferry survivors back over the river on the night of 24/25 September. The Airborne radios had not been operable, and the only communication link had been through 64th (London) Medium Regiment, Royal Artillery, attached to 43rd (W) Division.

43rd (Wessex) Division spent weeks defending XXX Corps' west flank on 'The Island', the low-lying ground between the Waal and Nederrijn. It was then shifted to the east flank to cooperate with US troops in reducing the Geilenkirchen salient (Operation Clipper), after which the area was defended through winter weather.

==== Rhineland ====
Once the German Ardennes Offensive had been halted, 43rd (W) Division returned to the offensive in early 1945 in Operation Blackcock to reduce the Roer Triangle, though exploitation was prevented by bad weather. The division then fought through the month-long battle of the Reichswald (Operation Veritable) to capture Kleve, roll up the Siegfried Line defences, cross the Goch escarpment and seize Xanten on the Rhine.

43rd (Wessex) Division was given a follow-up task in the assault crossing of the Rhine (Operation Plunder). Its leading brigade crossed the river on 25 March behind 51st (Highland) Division, which had carried the assault on the night of 23/24 March. It found itself in immediate combat, but had broken through by 29 March. During the subsequent pursuit, 43rd (W) Division was given the task of opening 'Club Route' for XXX Corps. The division was divided into five battle groups for the first 25 miles (40 km) drive, incorporating units of 8th Armoured Brigade, a complex process for the HQs and signal units involved. The advance began on 30 March: German rearguards were either overcome or bypassed, and the Twente Canal was crossed. The pursuit continued through April and ended with the capture of Bremen and XXX Corps' drive into the Cuxhaven peninsula. Hostilities ended on 5 May after the German surrender at Lüneburg Heath.

After a period as occupation forces in XXX Corps' district, 43rd (Wessex) Division's HQ and TA units were demobilised at the war's end.

=== 45th (West Country) Divisional Signals ===
45rh Division's formation sign, Drake's Drum, denoting its association with the West Country.

45th Division and its units were still being formed on the outbreak of war and they did not achieve full independence until 7 September 1939. Like its 1st Line parent, the division remained in training in the West Country during the Phoney War period. After Dunkirk it was moved into the anticipated invasion area of South East England, but by the Spring of 1941 it was in GHQ Reserve in the Midlands. It was regarded as a training and defensive formation and was placed on a lower establishment in December 1941, doing tours of duty in Essex and Northern Ireland.

As the war progressed, the main role of the lower-establishment formations became supplying reinforcements to the fighting formations. Notably, 45th (West Country) Divisional Signals also supplied signal sections to Beach Groups that played a vital role in the assault landings at Salerno (Operation Avalanche) and in Normandy. By August 1944 the drain of supplying reinforcements to 21st Army Group fighting in Normandy had so reduced 45th Division that it was broken up: 45th (WC) Divisional Signals was disbanded on 30 August 1944. The existing 77th (Holding) Division was redesignated 45th (Holding) Division and its signal unit was similarly renumbered. Coincidentally, 77th/45th (Holding) Division was commanded by a TA officer, Maj-Gen Godwin Michelmore, who had been 43rd (Wessex) Divisional Signals' first CO in 1920.

== Postwar ==
When the Territorial Army was reconstituted in 1947, 43rd (Wessex) Infantry Division Signal Regiment reformed in February, with the following organisation:

- Regimental HQ (RHQ) at Taunton
- 1 Squadron at Exeter
- 2 Squadron at Bridgwater
- 3 Squadron at Torquay

By 1957, 3 Squadron had moved to Bristol, its place at Torquay being taken by B Troop, while J Troop had been formed at Salisbury and L Troop at Plymouth. In addition, each brigade within the division had its own dedicated signal squadron providing Troops to the artillery regiments and rear link detachments to the infantry battalions. From 1959, these were numbered as follows:

- 340 Signal Sqn, formed from 128 Infantry Brigade Signals
- 341 Signal Sqn, formed from 129 Infantry Brigade Signals
- 342 Signal Sqn, formed from 130 Infantry Brigade Signals

By 1960, a divisional signal regiment was organised as follows:

- RHQ
  - Light Aid Detachment, Royal Electrical and Mechanical Engineers
  - Communications Section Troop
- HQ Squadron
  - Squadron HQ (SHQ)
  - Q Troop (quartermasters)
  - S Troop (stores)
  - M Troop (technical maintenance)
- 1 Squadron
  - SHQ
  - C Troop (lines)
  - O Troop (signal centre)
  - R Troop (radio relay)
- 2 Squadron
  - SHQ
  - A Troop (radio) (Divisional Main HQ)
  - B Troop (radio) (Divisional Rear HQ)

In 1960, the 43rd (Wessex) HQ converted from an infantry division into a district, with consequent reorganisation to its signals, which was redesignated 43rd Signal Regiment (Wessex). In addition, the regiment assumed command of the War Office Signal Squadron at Plymouth, 74 Independent Squadron, Women's Royal Army Corps, and a squadron from 57 Signal Regiment, while also taking over administrative responsibility for 340, 341 and 342 Brigade Signal Squadrons.

=== 43 (Wessex) Signal Squadron ===
In 1967, when the TA was converted into the Territorial and Army Volunteer Reserve (TAVR), the regiment was reduced to a single 43 (Wessex) Signal Squadron based at Bridgwater and forming part of 37 (Wessex and Welsh) Signal Regiment at Bristol, with 866 Signal Troop at Cheltenham and 867 and 899 Signal Troops at Bristol under command. In November 1992 the squadron transferred to 21 (Air Support) Signal Regiment at the former RAF base at Colerne. (Note: Uniquely, the Regular 21 Regiment had TAVR units under its command.)

The Strategic Defence Review of 1998 envisaged the squadron moving to 72 Signal Regiment (Volunteers), a Radio Support Regiment with its HQ at Oxford, but this did not happen. However, the Army 2020 changes announced in July 2012 saw the Bath-based 43 Sqn absorb the Bristol detachment from 57 (City & County of Bristol) Signal Squadron and be retitled 43 (Wessex and City & County of Bristol) Signal Squadron. This was carried out in 2014, when the squadron transferred back from the hybrid 21 Signal Rgt to become part of the present 39 (Skinners) Signal Regiment (Volunteers).

== Commanders ==
=== Commanding Officers ===
The following served as commanding officer of the unit and its duplicate:

43rd (Wessex) Divisional Signals

- Lt-Col W.G. Michelmore, DSO. MC, 1 April 1920
- Lt-Col John, 3rd Lord Basing, 11 February 1929
- Brevet Col C.H. Walsh, DSO, MC, 29 October 1934
- Lt-Col A.F.S. Fane, 1938
- Lt-Col E.R. Moore, 1939
- Lt-Col M.F.M. Parkes, MC, 1940
- Lt-Col H. Bartlett, 1940
- Lt-Col J.W. Gordon, 1942
- Lt-Col J.B. Lindsay, 1942
- Lt-Col A.J.G. McNair, 1943
- Lt-Col M. Trethowan, OBE, 1944–45
- Lt-Col W.F.B. Nutt, OBE, TD, 1947
- Lt-Col W.G. Daubeny, 1951
- Lt-Col R.W. Atkinson, OBE, 1954

45th (West Country) Divisional Signals

- Lt-Col A.F.S. Fane, 1939
- Lt-Col H.S. Lewis-Barclay, 1940
- Lt-Col W.G. Tucker, 1941
- Lt-Col R.A. Forsyth, TD, 1942–44

=== Honorary Colonels ===
The following served as Honorary Colonel of the unit:

- Col H.T.G. Moore, CMG, DSO, appointed 29 October 1924
- Lt-Col John, 3rd Lord Basing, former CO, appointed 29 October 1934
- Colonel Peter John Grogan 17 November 2017–31 May 2026
- Colonel D. M. Sharkey 1 June 2026

== See also ==
- 43 Signal Sqn page at British Army website

== External sources ==
- British Army site
- The Long, Long Trail
- Graham Watson, The Territorial Army 1947
