= Åndalsnes landings =

Battle during the Second World War

Coordinates: 62°33′48.45″N 7°40′59.59″E

- Part of the Norwegian campaign of World War II
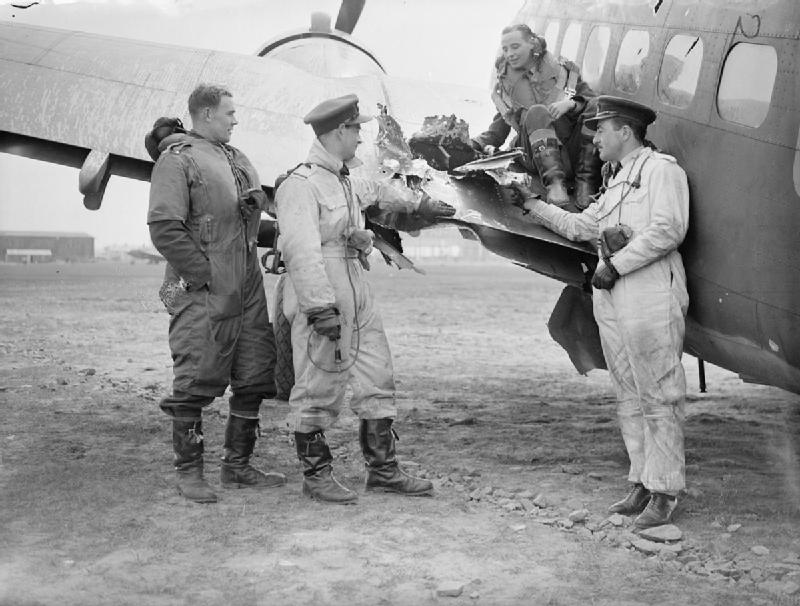
- The crew of a Hudson of No 224 Squadron, N7264/QX-Q, inspecting damage to their aircraft sustained during an operation to support troops landing at Andalsnes in Norway, April 1940.
Date	19 April – early May 1940
Location	Åndalsnes, Romsdal, Norway
Result	German victory

Belligerents
United Kingdom; Norway	Germany

Commanders and leaders
(United Kingdom) Bernard Paget (United Kingdom) Harold Morgan	

Strength
British 148th Infantry Brigade ~1,500 Men	Unknown (Had heavy and light artillery Support), 3 Pz I or II, 1 Pz IV

Casualties and losses
~1,190 casualties	Light

The Åndalsnes landings were a British military operation in 1940, during the Norwegian Campaign of World War II. Following the German invasion of Norway in April 1940, a British Army expeditionary force was landed at Åndalsnes, in Romsdal, to support Norwegian Army units defending the city of Trondheim. British forces were also landed at Namsos, north of Åndalsnes, in a complementary pincer movement. The British landings were unsuccessful and the Allies suffered a significant defeat at Åndalsnes.

== Prelude ==
Before the British operation had even begun it encountered a myriad of problems. The commanders for both the landing at Namsos and at Åndalsnes were replaced multiple times and, ultimately, the units deployed were being left utterly unprepared in contrast to their German counterparts. The 148th Infantry Brigade, commanded by Brigadier Harold Morgan, was part of the 49th (West Riding) Infantry Division. A Territorial Army (TA) formation recruiting, as its name suggests, from the West Riding of Yorkshire, the division was composed mainly of part-time soldiers who, in addition to being almost completely green and inexperienced, had received very little appropriate training for the operation in which they were to undertake. There were few modern weapons available and the brigade was understrength, having only two instead of the usual three infantry battalions, giving it a strength of just over 1,000 officers and men.

To prevent the British from advancing inland, German Fallschirmjägers made a parachute drop on the village and rail road junction of Dombås on 14 April.

== Battle ==
The southern attack began on 19 April, and Brigadier Morgan ran into serious problems almost immediately. For starters, he was unsure as to who he was directly subordinate to; the British military attaché in Norway, London, or if he was just to continue as previously ordered. Choosing to obey his orders to support the Norwegians as much as he could, he split his two battalions and moved them to support the Norwegians with his units strung out across the front. His units were then moved to Lillehammer in order to face a German attack from Oslo.

The German attack from Oslo was catastrophic for the underprepared British who, undermanned and underequipped, faced a heavy mortar bombardment which forced the Norwegian commander to order a retreat during which many of the 148th Brigade were captured due to a lack of transport. The survivors who managed to escape the Germans regrouped at Faaberg, north of Lillehammer, on 22 April. They were then attacked again by the Germans who, making use of artillery support, outflanked and encircled many of the British positions until again, the 148th Brigade pulled back 16 km (9.9 mi) further north to Tretten. The last German attack came in the evening of 22 April when Germans, supported by 4 tanks to which the British could do no damage, pushed them back to Heidal where, at last, the Germans halted.

The 148th Brigade had been reduced to 300 men and 9 officers, with Brigadier Morgan and his headquarters having been captured at Lillehammer.

Major-General Bernard Paget was given command of the remnants of Operation Sickle following their defeat and tried in vain to get them air support until, in early May, with heavy casualties and lacking control of the air, the British forces at Åndalsnes were withdrawn.

== Criticisms ==
In his book, Blood, Sweat and Arrogance: The Myths of Churchill's War, Gordon Corrigan criticised the Royal Navy's "Delusion" in believing that any breakout of ships were an attempt to reach the Atlantic. He also criticised Churchill's decision to break off the 146th and 148th Brigades as a "[f]olly of the highest degree" pointing out that the British had already briefed the units on the attack on Narvik and calling the idea to break off "two thirds of the force" as "nonsense". He also claims that the generals and admirals should have opposed him much more strongly than they did.

== See also ==
- List of British military equipment of World War II
- List of Norwegian military equipment of World War II
- List of German military equipment of World War II
