= John Edwards (British Army officer) =

British Army officer

Major-General John Edwards CBE DSO MC
- Born: 8 February 1896; Hornsey, England
- Died: 6 May 1984 (aged 88); Nairobi, Kenya
- Military career
- Allegiance: United Kingdom
- Branch: British Army
- Service years: 1915–1947
- Rank: Major-General
- Service number: 10842
- Unit: Scots Guards
- Commands: SHAEF Mission to the Netherlands (1944–45); 45th Infantry Division (1943–44); 148th Independent Brigade (1942)
- Conflicts: First World War; Arab revolt in Palestine; Second World War
- Awards: Commander of the Order of the British Empire; Distinguished Service Order; Military Cross

Major-General John Keith Edwards, CBE, DSO, MC (8 February 1896 – 6 May 1984) was a senior British Army officer.

== Military career ==
Edwards was commissioned into the Scots Guards, in 1915, during the First World War. He was awarded the Military Cross (MC) in September 1917. The citation for his MC appeared in a later issue of The London Gazette, in January 1918, and reads as follows:

For conspicuous gallantry and devotion to duty. In spite of a severe flesh wound in his leg he continued to command his platoon until the objective was captured, working hard at the consolidation himself and setting a splendid example to his men. He did not go sick until ordered to do so by the medical officer, and his pluck and coolness were most marked.

Edwards went on to remain in the army during the interwar period and became an instructor at the Staff College, Quetta, in India in 1936 and a staff officer in Palestine and Transjordan in 1939 during the Arab revolt there.

In the Second World War, Edwards served as brigadier on the general staff at East Africa Command from 1940, commander of the 148th Independent Brigade in 1942 and General Officer Commanding 45th Infantry Division from 1943. His last appointment was as Head of the SHAEF Mission to the Netherlands before retiring in 1947.

== Bibliography ==
- Smart, Nick (2005). Biographical Dictionary of British Generals of the Second World War. Barnesley: Pen & Sword. ISBN 1844150496.

Military offices
Preceded by Harold Morgan	GOC 45th Infantry Division; 1943–1944	Succeeded by Godwin Michelmore
