= Godwin Michelmore =

Major-General Sir Godwin Michelmore KBE CB DSO MC TD JP DL
- Born: 14 March 1894; Exeter, Devon, England
- Died: 25 October 1982 (aged 88)
- Military career
- Allegiance: United Kingdom
- Branch: British Army
- Rank: Major-General
- Service number: 25379
- Unit: Royal Engineers
- Commands: 43rd (Wessex) Divisional Signals (1920–1929); 134th Infantry Brigade (1939–1941); Devon and Cornwall County Division (1941); 77th Infantry Division (1941–1944); 45th Holding Division (1944–1945)
- Conflicts: First World War; Second World War
- Awards: Knight Commander of the Order of the British Empire; Companion of the Order of the Bath; Distinguished Service Order; Military Cross; Territorial Decoration; Mentioned in Despatches (2)
- Other work: Lord Mayor of Exeter (1949–1950)

Major-General Sir William Godwin Michelmore, KBE, CB, DSO, MC, TD, JP, DL (14 March 1894 – 25 October 1982) was a senior British Army officer who served in both world wars and was later aide-de-camp to King George VI and Lord Mayor of Exeter.

== Early life and military career ==
William Godwin Michelmore was born in Exeter, Devon, and educated at Rugby School. During the First World War, Michelmore was commissioned as a second lieutenant into the British Army's Royal Engineers and fought in the Battle of Passchendaele, where he was wounded. In June 1918 he was commanding 19th Divisional Signal Company, which by July had been transferred to Fifth Army, defending Béthune on the Aire-La Bassée canal. By that time, Michelmore had been promoted to acting major and had been awarded the Military Cross (MC) having also been twice mentioned in despatches.

From 1920 to 1929 he commanded the Exeter-based 43rd (Wessex) Divisional Signals in the Territorial Army (TA), first as a Major, then as Lieutenant-Colonel.

At the beginning of the Second World War, Michelmore commanded 134th Infantry Brigade, a second-line TA brigade raised in Devon. From 30 October 1941 to the end of the war he commanded the Devon and Cornwall County Division (later re-designated successively as the 77th Infantry Division, 77th Infantry (Reserve) Division, 77th Holding Division, and finally the 45th Holding Division). Michelmore also served as Aide-de-camp (ADC) to King George VI between 1942 and 1947.

In retirement he served as Lord Mayor of Exeter from 1949 to 1950.

Michelmore was appointed a Companion of the Order of the Bath in 1945 and created a Knight Commander of the Order of the British Empire in 1953.

In early 1971 he married Winsome Montgomery, one of Bernard Montgomery's sisters.

== Sources ==
- Obituary of Major-Gen Sir G. Michelmore, The Times, Saturday, 30 October 1982 (pg. 10; Issue 61376; col F)
- 1911 UK census
- Joslen, H. F. (2003) [1960]. Orders of Battle: Second World War, 1939–1945. Uckfield, East Sussex: Naval and Military Press. ISBN 978-1-84342-474-1.
- Montgomery, Brian (22 November 2010). A Field Marshal in the Family. Pen and Sword. ISBN 9781848844254.
- Maj-Gen R.F.H. Nalder, The Royal Corps of Signals: A History of its Antecedents and Developments (Circa 1800–1955), London: Royal Signals Institution, 1958.
- Smart, Nick (2005). Biographical Dictionary of British Generals of the Second World War. Barnsley: Pen & Sword. ISBN 1844150496.

Military offices
Preceded by John Edwards	GOC 45th Infantry Division; 1944−1945	Post disbanded
Civic offices
Preceded by William Slade	Mayor of Exeter; 1949	Succeeded by John Geoffrey Rowe Orchard
