= Harold de Riemer Morgan =

Major-General in the British Army

Major-General Harold de Riemer Morgan DSO
- Born: 12 March 1888
- Died: 1 June 1964 (aged 76)
- Military career
- Allegiance: United Kingdom
- Branch: British Army
- Service years: 1908–1946
- Rank: Major-General
- Service number: 12009
- Units: Buffs (Royal East Kent Regiment); Royal Northumberland Fusiliers
- Commands: 45th Infantry Division (1941–43); 148th Infantry Brigade (1940–41); 2nd Battalion, Royal Northumberland Fusiliers (1936–39)
- Conflicts: First World War; Second World War
- Awards: Distinguished Service Order; Mentioned in Despatches

Major-General Harold de Riemer Morgan DSO (12 March 1888 – 1 June 1964) was a British Army officer who served as colonel of the Royal Northumberland Fusiliers.

== Military career ==
Morgan was commissioned into the British Army on 20 August 1908. He served in the First World War as commanding officer of a battalion in which capacity he stubbornly maintained positions for which he was awarded the Distinguished Service Order in September 1918. The citation for the medal reads:

For conspicuous gallantry and devotion to duty. This officer commanded his battalion with ability and energy during a trying time. Against heavy odds he stubbornly maintained positions, and showed fine leadership.

He became commanding officer of the 2nd Battalion Royal Northumberland Fusiliers in 1936.

Morgan served in the Second World War, becoming commander of the 148th Infantry Brigade, part of the 49th (West Riding) Infantry Division, in February 1940. The brigade took part in the Norwegian campaign, where one battalion was deployed to Narvik and the other two battalions formed part of 'Sickleforce', a formation which took part in the Åndalsnes landings, suffered heavy losses and had to be withdrawn in early May 1940. He became General Officer Commanding 45th Infantry Division in May 1941 and then retired at the end of the war. He was appointed colonel of the Northumberland Fusiliers on 1 January 1947.

== Bibliography ==
- Smart, Nick (2005). Biographical Dictionary of British Generals of the Second World War. Barnsley, South Yorkshire: Pen and Sword Books. ISBN 1844150496.

Military offices
Preceded by Edmond Schreiber	GOC 45th Infantry Division; 1941–1943	Succeeded by John Edwards
Honorary titles
Preceded by William Herbert	Colonel of the Royal Northumberland Fusiliers; 1947–1953	Succeeded by Sir Francis Festing
