= Edmond Schreiber =

British Army general

Lieutenant-General Sir Edmond Schreiber KCB DSO KStJ DL
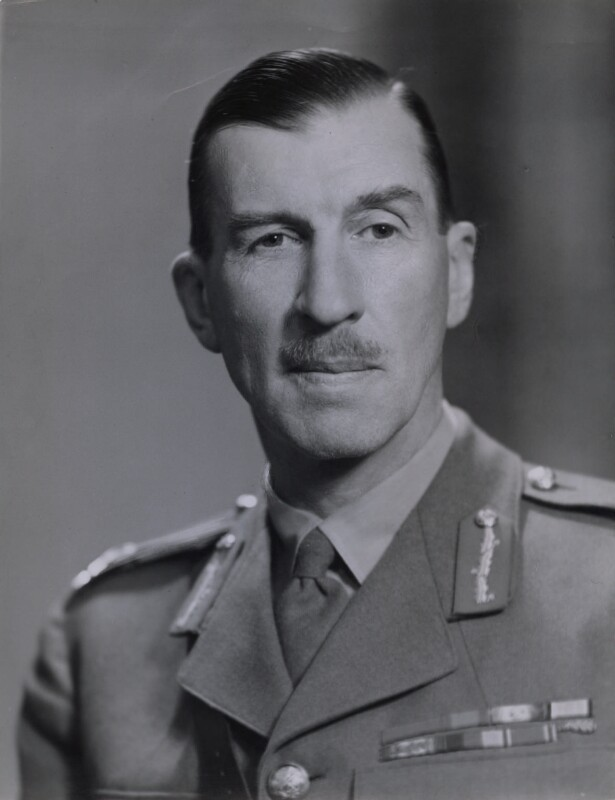
- Schreiber in 1944
- Born: 30 April 1890; London, England
- Died: 8 October 1972 (aged 82); Exmouth, Devonshire, England
- Military career
- Allegiance: United Kingdom
- Branch: British Army
- Service years: 1909–1947
- Rank: Lieutenant-General
- Nickname: "Teddy"
- Service number: 12846
- Unit: Royal Artillery
- Commands: Malta (1944–46); South-Eastern Command (1944); Western Command (1942–44); First Army (1942); V Corps (1941–42); 45th Infantry Division (1940–41); 61st Infantry Division (1940); X Field Brigade, Royal Artillery (1939–40)
- Conflicts: First World War; Second World War
- Awards: Knight Commander of the Order of the Bath; Distinguished Service Order; Knight of the Order of St John; Mentioned in Despatches (5)
- Other work: Deputy Lieutenant of Devon (1948); National President, Old Contemptibles Association (1960)

Lieutenant-General Sir Edmond Charles Acton Schreiber, KCB, DSO, KStJ, DL (30 April 1890 – 8 October 1972) was a senior British Army officer who served in both the First World War and the Second World War. In the latter he commanded the 45th Infantry Division, V Corps and the First Army.

== Military career ==
Born in London, England, on 30 April 1890, the son of Brigadier-General Acton Lemuel Schreiber, Edmond Charles Acton Schreiber was educated at Wellington College, Berkshire and the Royal Military Academy, Woolwich, from where he was commissioned as a second lieutenant into the British Army's Royal Field Artillery on 23 December 1909. He was promoted to lieutenant on 23 December 1912. He served in the First World War with the British Expeditionary Force (BEF) on the Western Front, earning the Distinguished Service Order (DSO) in December 1914, the citation for which reads:

Very gallant conduct on 14th September in saving horses which had become entangled in blocked road, and man-handling guns away from a position which had become untenable from a very heavy shell fire, continuing to work, although wounded.

He was also four times mentioned in dispatches and ended the war as a brevet major, having been promoted to that rank on 1 January 1918.

In the 1930s, during the interwar period, he attended the Staff College, Camberley, from 1923–1924, before returning there as an instructor from 1930–1933, later becoming a staff officer at the War Office from 1934–1937, Chief Staff Officer at the Senior Officers' School, Sheerness, in 1938, and was Brigadier Royal Artillery in Southern Command, from 1938–1939, the same year the Second World War began.

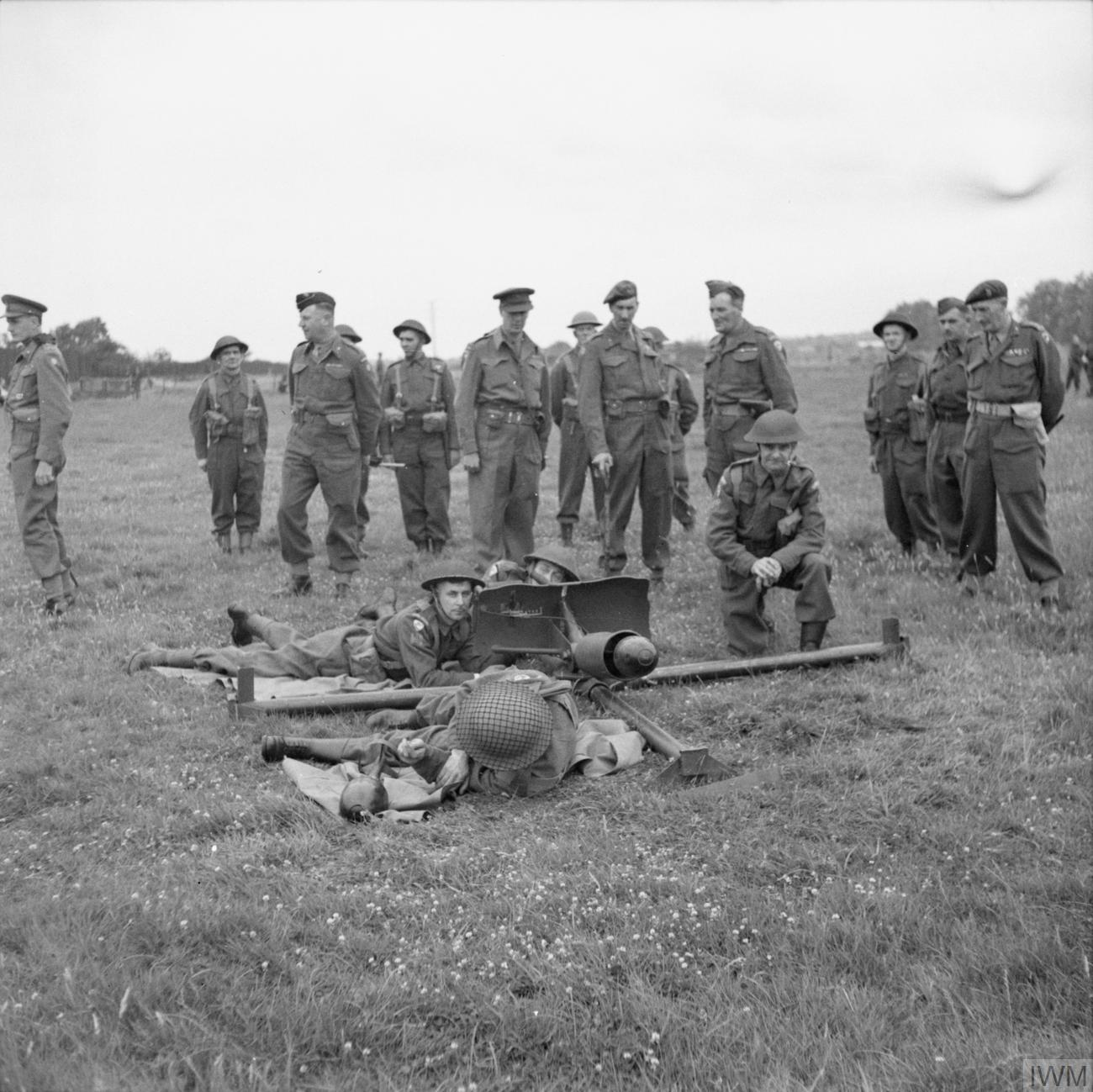
Members of the Kent Home Guard demonstrate a 'Blacker Bombard' spigot mortar during an inspection by Lieutenant General Sir Edward Schreiber, GOC South East Command, pictured in the middle wearing a beret, 23 July 1944.

During the Second World War, Schreiber served with the British Expeditionary Force (BEF) in France between 1939 and 1940. Promoted to acting Major-General on 26 April 1940, he became General Officer Commanding (GOC) 61st Infantry Division on the same date, before being made GOC 45th Infantry Division later in 1940. In May 1941 he was promoted to acting Lieutenant-General to take command of V Corps later that year. In May 1942 he received the rank of temporary lieutenant-general, and in July that year he was appointed to command the British First Army which was later to be the parent organisation for Allied forces in French North Africa after Operation Torch in November. Schreiber had to resign after only two months, however, as he developed a kidney problem and became unfit for active service.

Restricted to non-field roles, Schreiber became General Officer Commanding-in-Chief (GOC-in-C) Western Command in 1942 and of South Eastern Command in 1944. Between 1944 and 1946, Schreiber was Governor and Commander-in-Chief of Malta. He retired from the British Army after the war in 1947.

== Retirement ==
Schreiber was appointed Deputy Lieutenant of Devon in 1948 and National President of the Old Contemptibles Association in 1960.

== Family ==
Schreiber married Phyllis Barchard in 1916; they had two daughters.

== Bibliography ==
- Alanbrooke, Field Marshal Lord (2001). Danchev, Alex & Todman, Daniel (eds.). War Diaries 1939–1945. Phoenix Press. ISBN 1-84212-526-5.
- Smart, Nick (2005). Biographical Dictionary of British Generals of the Second World War. Barnesley: Pen & Sword. ISBN 1844150496.

Military offices
Preceded by Adrian Carton de Wiart	GOC 61st Infantry Division; April–May 1940	Succeeded by Adrian Carton de Wiart
Preceded by Desmond Anderson	GOC 45th Infantry Division; 1940–1941	Succeeded by Harold Morgan
Preceded by Bernard Montgomery	GOC V Corps; 1941–1942	Succeeded by Charles Allfrey
New command	GOC First Army; July–August 1942	Succeeded by Kenneth Anderson
Preceded by Sir James Marshall-Cornwall	GOC-in-C Western Command; 1942–1944	Succeeded by Sir Daril Watson
Preceded by Sir John Swayne	GOC-in-C South-Eastern Command; 1944	Succeeded by Eric Miles
Government offices
Preceded by Lord Gort	Governor of Malta; 1944–1946	Succeeded by Lord Douglas
