= 55th (Wessex) Field Regiment, Royal Artillery =

Former British Territorial Army unit

55th (Wessex) Field Regiment, RA 255 (Wessex) Medium Regiment, RA
- Royal Artillery cap badge
- Active: 1927–1 April 1967
- Country: United Kingdom
- Branch: Territorial Army
- Type: Yeomanry
- Role: Field artillery
- Size: 2–4 Batteries
- Part of: 43rd (Wessex) Division; 45th Division; Guards Armoured Division
- Garrison/HQ: County Territorial Hall, Taunton
- Nickname: 'West Somerset Yeomanry'
- Engagements: Operation Epsom; Operation Goodwood; Operation Bluecoat; Operation Market Garden; Operation Veritable; Ems crossing

55th (Wessex) Field Regiment was a unit of the Royal Artillery in Britain's part-time Territorial Army (TA). Its origin was a brigade organised in 1927 from the former West Somerset Yeomanry and field batteries from Wiltshire. Just before the outbreak of World War II the Wiltshire elements were separated to form a second regiment, after which the 55th (Wessex) was often referred to simply as the West Somerset Yeomanry (WSY). It served in Home Forces for the first part of the war, but in 1942 it was assigned to the Guards Armoured Division and served with that formation throughout the campaign in North West Europe, from Normandy to the German surrender in 1945. It continued as an artillery regiment in the postwar TA until 1967.

== Origin ==
The Yeomanry were the mounted arm of the British Army's Auxiliary forces and by World War I these part-time soldiers had become part of the Territorial Force. The West Somerset Yeomanry (WSY), first formed in Somersetshire in 1794, served at Gallipoli, in Egypt and Palestine, and on the Western Front in both the mounted and dismounted roles. However, after the war it was decided that only the 14 most senior yeomanry regiments would be retained as cavalry in the new Territorial Army (TA); the rest were converted to other roles. Thus on 1 June 1920 the WSY was transferred to the Royal Artillery, becoming part of 94th (Dorset & Somerset Yeomanry) Field Brigade. In 1927 it was transferred to the 55th (Wessex) Field Brigade, which already contained field artillery units recruited in Wiltshire and was reorganised as follows:

- Brigade Headquarters at County Territorial Hall, Taunton, Somerset
- 217 (Wiltshire) Field Battery (Howitzer) at Drill Hall, Swindon, Wiltshire
- 220 (Wiltshire) Field Battery at Swindon
- 373 (West Somerset Yeomanry) Field Battery at Taunton
- 374 (West Somerset Yeomanry) Field Battery at Glastonbury, later Shepton Mallet

The brigade served as 'Army Troops' in 43rd (Wessex) Divisional Area. In 1938 the RA modernised its nomenclature and a lieutenant-colonel's command was designated a 'regiment' rather than a 'brigade'; this applied to TA field brigades from 1 November 1938.

After the Munich Crisis the TA was doubled in size and its units formed duplicates. In the case of the 55th (Wessex) this was done on 22 July 1939 by splitting off the two Wiltshire batteries to form 112th Field Regiment, with its own Regimental Headquarters (RHQ) at Swindon. While the new regiment remained with 43rd (Wessex) Division, 55th (Wessex) Field Regiment joined the duplicate 45th Division that was in the process of formation.

Part of the reorganisation was that field regiments changed from four six-gun batteries to an establishment of two batteries, each of three four-gun troops. Now consisting solely of 373 and 374 (WSY) batteries, 55th (Wessex) Field Rgt was frequently referred to simply as the 'West Somerset Yeomanry'. (Note: The Commonwealth War Graves Commission (CWGC) records casualties under '55 (West Somerset Yeomanry) Field Regt' rather than '55 (Wessex)'.)

Before World War II the TA field artillery was equipped with 18-pounder guns and 4.5-inch howitzers, all of World War I patterns. Partial mechanisation was carried out from 1927, but the guns retained iron-tyred wheels until pneumatic tyres began to be introduced just before the outbreak of war. A few Morris CDSW gun tractors were issued to TA batteries in early 1939. The rearmament programme of 1938 introduced the Ordnance QF 25-pounder gun-howitzer, initially in the form of the hybrid 18/25-pounder consisting of a 25-pdr gun mounted on a converted 18-pdr carriage, but these were only just being issued to Regular units when war broke out, and TA units had to wait.

== World War II ==
=== Mobilisation and training ===
The TA was mobilised on 1 September 1939, two days before war was declared. 45th Division assumed full independence from 43rd (Wessex) Division on 7 September. Like its 1st Line parent, the division remained in training in the West Country under Southern Command during the Phoney War period.

After the British Expeditionary Force (BEF) had been evacuated from Dunkirk in June 1940, 45th Division was moved into the anticipated invasion area of South East England. Following the loss of the BEF's equipment in France, the 45th was one of the better-equipped formations, its three field regiments together having 12 x 25-pdrs, 6 x 18-pdrs and 12 x 4.5-inch howitzers (against an establishment of 72 x 25-pdrs). In November 1940 the division moved to I Corps covering North East England and Yorkshire.

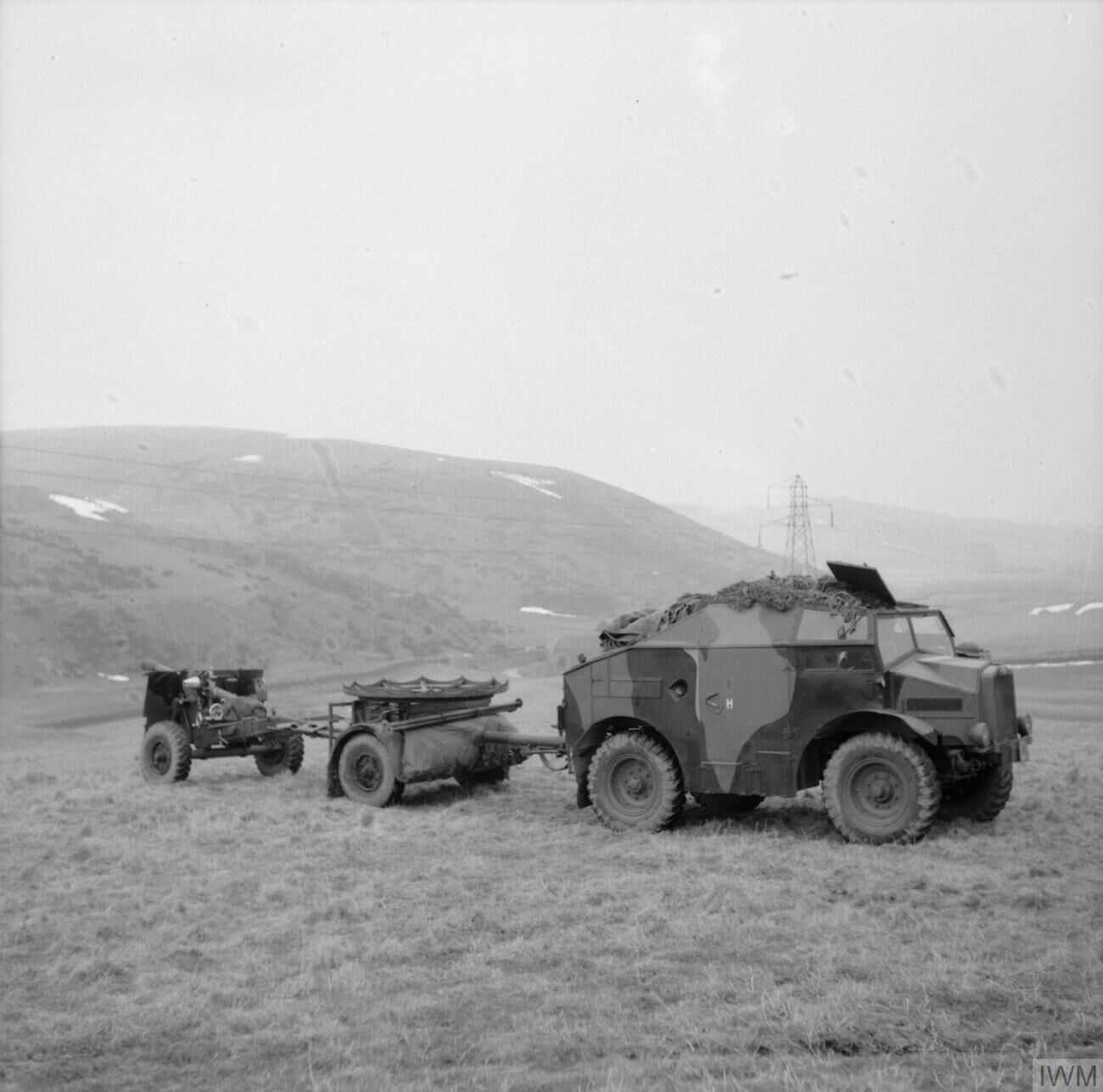
25-pounder gun and Quad on exercise in the UK, March 1941.

The BEF's experience in the Battle of France had shown up the problems with the two-battery organisation: field regiments were intended to support an infantry brigade of three battalions. This could not be managed without severe disruption to the regiment. As a result, field regiments were reorganised into three 8-gun batteries, but it was not until late 1940 that the RA had enough trained battery staffs to carry out the reorganisation. 55th (Wessex) Field Rgt formed its third battery, designated 'W' Bty, at Barnsley on 15 November 1940, and it was numbered as 439 Bty on 1 February 1941.

From February 1941 45th Division was in GHQ Reserve in the Midlands, moving to East Anglia under XI Corps in July. 45th Division was reduced to a lower establishment in December 1941 and thereafter was used as a source of men and units for other formations. 55th (Wessex) Field Rgt joined the Guards Armoured Division as its second field regiment on 8 June 1942.

=== Overlord training ===
Guards Armoured Division's formation sign.

At the time, Guards Armoured Division was stationed in Southern Command, but its components, particularly specialist units such as the artillery, could be sent all over the country to training areas and practice camps, particularly to firing ranges on Salisbury Plain for the artillery. Equipped with 25-pdrs towed by Quad gun tractors, the WSY usually supported the lorried infantry of 32nd Guards Brigade, while the division's other regiment, 153rd (Leicestershire Yeomanry) Field Rgt, had self-propelled guns and supported the tanks of 5th Guards Armoured Brigade. Both regiments had access to Sherman tanks with dummy guns to act as armoured observation posts (OPs).

In February 1943 the division took part in Exercise Spartan, involving most of the troops stationed in Britain, then went to Norfolk where there were a number of battle training areas. In June 1943 it moved to the Yorkshire Wolds, where in mid-February 1944 the whole division participated in a 12-day training exercise (Exercise Eagle) along with the other divisions assigned to VIII Corps. Finally, in April the division moved to Southern England to its concentration area round Brighton and Eastbourne for the forthcoming invasion of Normandy, Operation Overlord.

=== Normandy ===
Overlord began with the landings on D Day (6 June 1944). The infantry of 32nd Guards Brigade, accompanied by the WSY, were the first part of the division to cross to Normandy, and came under 43rd (Wessex) Division to act as a firm base for attacks being made across the River Odon (Operation Epsom). On 29 June a German counter-attack against Cheux saw several Panther tanks get through almost to the village, and the WSY in support in the brigade HQ area received the order 'Prepare for tanks'. (Field regiments carried 12 rounds per gun of armour-piercing solid shot for such emergencies.)

Guards Armoured's first divisional action was Operation Goodwood on 18 July, in which VIII Corps' three armoured divisions would secretly cross to the east side of the River Orne and then thrust southwards past Caen deep into German-held territory. The Guards were the second division in the column, but the advance ran out of impetus once the tanks had passed out of range of the supporting artillery, which was still west of the river because of congestion in the bridgehead.

The German front began to break up at the end of July. Guards Armoured was deployed to support II Canadian Corps's Operation Spring on 25 July but did not get into action. It was then shifted west as British Second Army began its move south (Operation Bluecoat) on 30 July. On the afternoon of 31 July Guards Armoured was ordered out of its assembly points north of Caumont to advance on 11th Armoured Division's flank. By evening it was in contact with the enemy south-east of St Martin and next day, despite traffic jams, it secured its objectives after some hard fighting. The advance lost impetus, with hard fighting round Arclais and Estry, but by 11 August the division was pushing its way south from Vire. The Germans pulled out on 16 August and Guards Armoured Division went into Second Army reserve.

25-pounders of 439 Bty, 55th (Wessex) Field Rgt near Hechtel, firing in support of Guards Armoured Division in the bridgehead over the Meuse-Escaut Canal, 16 September 1944.

As above.

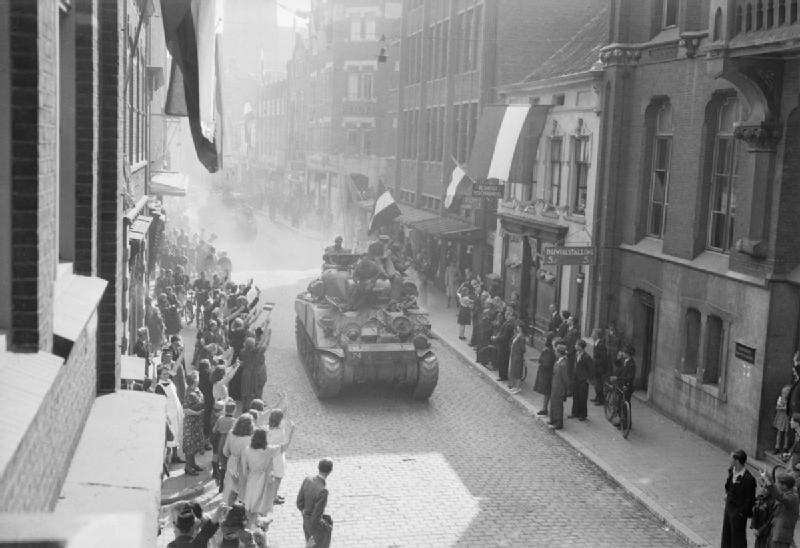
Sherman OP tank of C Trp, 55th (Wessex) Field Rgt driving through newly liberated Eindhoven, 19 September 1944.

After Bluecoat, the Canadians' Operation Totalize completed the breakout and much of the German army was trapped in the Falaise Pocket. 21st Army Group then began a rapid advance across northern France, with Guards Armoured driving over 90 miles (140 km) in under 24 hours to seize a bridge over the River Somme at Corbie on 31 August. The division then broke up into brigade groups as it raced across Belgium. 32nd Guards Bde took the right centre-line, with the WSY following the Welsh Guards Group straight up the main road to Brussels. It covered 90 miles (140 km) in one day, breaking through rearguards and roadblocks to liberate Brussels by the end of 3 September.

Opposition hardened at the Albert Canal, but the Guards seized a bridgehead over it and advanced towards Hechtel. The Irish Guards group worked its way through Beringen, with orders to capture the slag heaps that the enemy were using as OPs. Shelling became heavy, and Major R. Eames, commanding 439 Bty, was wounded as he prepared an OP. However, the attack went in at 17.00. supported by the guns of the WSY, which also shelled some German armoured vehicles. The Irish Guards had secured the slag heaps by nightfall on 7 September. The Irish and Welsh Guards groups pushed on towards Hechtel in confused fighting, during which Maj G. Hollebone, commanding 374 Bty was wounded. On 10 September the Grenadier Guards group, followed by the Irish Guards group, advanced under cover of an artillery concentration and smokescreen, and rushed a vital undestroyed bridge over the Meuse-Escaut canal. The divisional artillery was then deployed well forward at Hechtel to cover the bridgehead, which was defended by the infantry of 32nd Guards Bde while the tanks went back to refit for the next operation.

=== Market Garden ===
Guards Armoured Division was chosen to spearhead XXX Corps in the ground part of Operation Market Garden to link up a series of bridgeheads captured by airborne troops as far as Arnhem on the Nederrijn. The division started at 14.35 on 17 September behind a rolling barrage provided by the divisional and corps artillery, advancing at 8 miles per hour (13 km/h), but immediately got held up by the German anti-tank screen. After a half-hour battle to clear a way through, the barrage started again and the advance resumed. The division secured the bridge at Valkenswaard before nightfall. Progress was slow next day, but the division drove through Eindhoven and reached Zon by the end of the day, where the engineers began to replace the blown bridge over the Wilhelmina Canal. This was completed before first light on 19 September, when the leading elements started off once more, crossing the bridge over the Maas at Grave that had been captured intact by US airborne forces. However, it took time to prepare the major attack necessary to capture Nijmegen and its vital bridges over the Waal, for which only the Leicestershire Yeomanry was available. Meanwhile, the WSY was protecting the fragile lines of communication through Grave, where heavy attacks began on 20 September. While the Guards Armoured and 43rd (Wessex) divisions endeavoured to fight their way through ideal defensive terrain across 'The Island' towards Arnhem, the guns had no room to deploy, and 32nd Guards Bde had to be diverted south to restore the supply route, which had been cut. The attempt to reach Arnhem failed and on the night of 25/26 September the survivors of 1st Airborne Division were evacuated over the Nederrijn. 32nd Guards Bde then had the task of defending The Island against some determined counter-attacks until the division went into reserve south of Nijmegen on 6 October.

=== Winter 1944–45 ===
While the rest of the division was out of the line, its two field regiments went back into action on 12 October in support of 82nd US Airborne Division. Since forward observation officers were not required, battery and troop commanders could spend more time with their subunits, and some training was carried out, with calibration and training course shoots being carried out on real targets in the German lines. Detached single guns were used for this purpose, so as not to give away the battery positions to enemy sound-rangers. On 23 October, the anniversary of the Second Battle of El Alamein, every gun of XXX Corps in range fired a 'Feu de joie' into enemy lines. On 12 November the division moved from Nijmegen to Sittard, where it held a defence line for several weeks that were quiet except for some exchanges of shellfire. The divisional artillery began preparing gun pits and ammunition dumps for Operation Shears to clear the Roer Triangle, but the operation was called off.

The division was moving into winter quarters at Louvain when the Germans began their Ardennes Offensive (the Battle of the Bulge) on 16 December. Guards Armoured Division was sent to block their possible advance over the River Meuse. 32nd Guards Bde was moved to Namur on 25 December, where the gunners dug gun pits in the frozen ground. The WSY was reinforced by the Sexton self-propelled 25-pdrs of 86th (Hertfordshire Yeomanry) Field Rgt supporting 29th Armoured Brigade on the Meuse. However, there was no breakthrough and the brigade group was relieved on 27 December.

Guards Armoured Division returned to its winter quarters, where it remained until the beginning of February 1945. During this period the divisional artillery trained on the newly opened ranges at Lommel.

=== Germany ===
Guards Armoured Division was part of XXX Corps' reserve for the offensive into the Reichswald (Operation Veritable) beginning on 7 February 1945. Conditions in the forest were so bad that only the division's infantry were called forward: 32nd Guards Bde Group with the WSY moved up to Nijmegen on 11 February. The brigade attacked on 13 and again on 16 February, when 5th Battalion Coldstream Guards attacked a group of farmsteads on the approaches to Goch. Battalion HQ was hit by enemy shell and mortar fire and Maj T. Graham, commander of 373 Bty, was among the wounded. As the final attack on Goch went in on the afternoon of 21 February, Maj D. Yorke, commanding 439 Bty covering a retirement by the Irish Guards, won a Military Cross (MC) for remaining standing in the open under mortar and shell fire to direct his guns. On 25 February some of the Guards tanks were brought into the fighting, and the guns kept up a continuous barrage on all known enemy positions as Keppeln and Calcar were captured, followed by Udem, captured under artificial moonlight. Bitter fighting continued, and it was not until 5 March that the Guards' armour passed through and captured Bonninghardt and its commanding ground. On 7 March the division began a final push to cut the road on which the German Rhine bridgehead depended. The WSY deployed its guns on a large airfield at Bonninghardt, with command posts established in the air raid shelters, and together with heavy guns supported the attack, which went in in the gathering dusk. While the engineers prepared the way in the dark, a massive barrage was prepared for the following morning. The attack was delayed until afternoon because flanking units were no ready, but the Coldstream Guards group finally attacked at 14.30 and broke through. By nightfall there was no more resistance on the west bank of the Rhine.

Although Guards Armoured was not scheduled to take part in the assault crossing of the Rhine (Operation Plunder) – it would have to wait for bridges to be built before it could get its armour across – the divisional artillery played a full part. Both the West Somerset and Leicestershire Yeomanry field regiments, reinforced by the Hertfordshire Yeomanry and the divisional light anti-aircraft regiment (94th) moved up on the night of 22 March and deployed in hides just short of the river under cover of darkness. They were allowed to begin digging their gun pits at mid-day on 23 March, and the bombardment began at 17.00. That night the assault formations crossed the river.

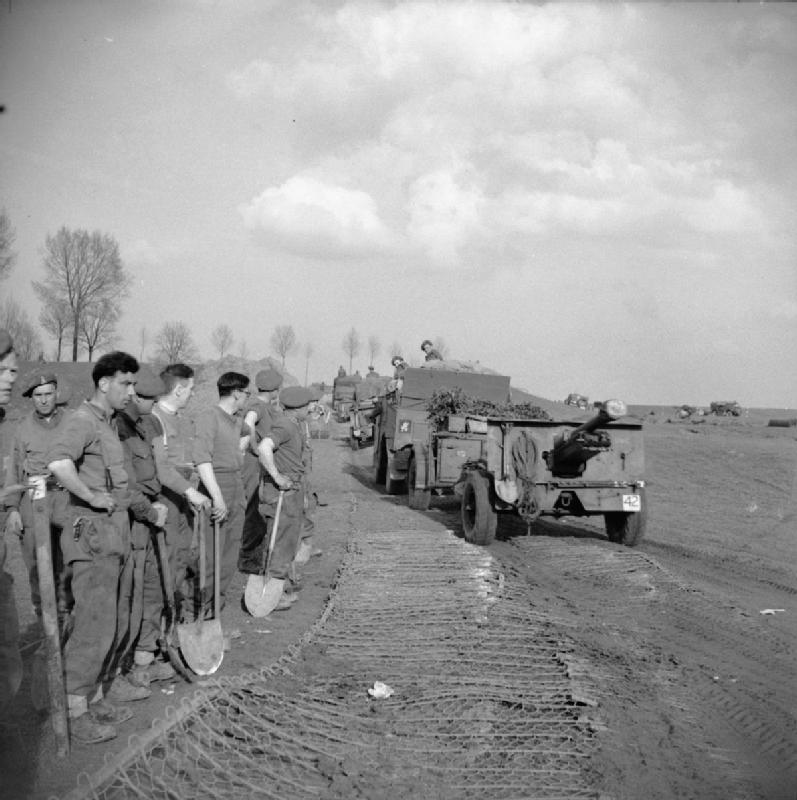
25-pounders moving up to cross the Rhine, March 1945.

Once the bridgeheads were established, Guards Armoured Division passed through 15th (Scottish) Infantry Division on 30 March and began driving across Germany with XXX Corps heading for Bremen. In anticipation of swift movement the two brigades were accompanied by Sextons of 153rd (Leicestershire Yeomanry) and 86th (Hertfordshire Yeomanry), while the WSL's towed 25-pdrs were further back along the road. After dealing with rearguards 32nd Guards Bde made a quick night dash for Lingen in an attempt to seize the bridge over the River Ems. The bridge was blown just as they arrived; another was found next day (3 April), but it was heavily defended and was prepared for demolition. A coordinated surprise attack was arranged, in which the WSY fired all round the bridge (without any previous registration), then lifted its fire onto the wood behind, while the tanks and engineers charged the roadblocks. Captain Ian Liddell of the Coldstream Guards, who cut the wires to the demolition charges, was awarded the Victoria Cross and Capt J.V. Barnes of the WSY won an MC.

3rd Division crossed this bridge and opened up the route ahead, and Guards Armoured began moving forward again on 6 April, towards Cloppenburg with the objective of reaching the Weser, 80 miles (130 km) away. However, progress was slow, with the roads obstructed by demolitions and mines and numerous rearguards to overcome. Men of the WSY were killed in a skirmish at an apparently empty farmhouse, and Maj Ranulph Carew-Hunt, a battery commander in the WSY, was killed on 11 April trying to obtain observation over enemy positions. The resistance finally softened on 14 April when the division reached Schwichteler, south-east of Cloppenburg and was given a short rest. Then on 17 April Guards Armoured was switched nearly 100 miles (160 km) to XII Corps for its drive to isolate Bremen from Hamburg. It fought its way through Visselhövede with heavy artillery support and then drove on, spearheaded by the armoured brigade, while the divisional artillery accompanied 32nd Guards Bde. which moved out towards Rotenburg on 20 April. The attack went in behind a heavy barrage and the town was captured with few losses. The artillery and part of 32nd Guards Bde then went to help 5th Guards Armoured Bde capture Zeven on 24 April; Maj J.R.S. Peploe, commander of 373 Bty, and his entire OP tank crew were wounded by enemy shelling. The force then pushed on towards the outskirts of Bremen, which surrendered on 27 April. The division reverted to XXX Corps and pushed on towards the Elbe estuary dealing with the usual rearguards, demolitions and mines. On 4 May Capt R.P. Wheaton, the WSY's forward observation officer and his OP tank were all killed by a large Naval mine buried under the road. That day the German surrender at Lüneburg Heath was signed and came into force next morning.

Guards Armoured's gunners celebrated the surrender by choosing a deserted area and firing into it a feu de joie codenamed 'Fire Plan Grand Finale'. This consisted of shells from every gun of every calibre within range, followed by smoke shells of every available colour.

The units of 21st Army Group were then engaged in occupation duties. This required infantry rather than firepower, so on 12 June Guards Armoured Division gave up its tanks and other armoured vehicles and became simply 'Guards Division', in which 55th (Wessex) Field Regiment continued to serve until demobilisation.

The Commonwealth War Graves Commission (CWGC) lists 43 members of the regiment who died on service. Others may have been listed simply as 'Royal Artillery' or under previous regiments (such as Capt R.P. Wheaton, listed under his original regiment, 145th (Berkshire Yeomanry) Field Rgt).

== Postwar ==
55th (Wessex) Field Regiment was placed in 'suspended animation' in British Army of the Rhine on 31 December 1946 and next day (1 January 1947) was reformed in the TA as 255 (Wessex) Medium Regiment in 91st (Field) Army Group Royal Artillery, with RHQ at Shepton Mallet.

Subsequently, in 1950 the regiment absorbed 663 (Somerset) Super Heavy Regiment (a new regiment that had been formed at Midsomer Norton in 1947), which became Q Bty, and RHQ moved back to Taunton. In 1956 it amalgamated with 421 (Dorset) Coast Rgt, becoming 255 (West Somerset Yeomanry and Dorset Garrison) Medium Rgt. In 1961 it merged with 294 (Queen's Own Dorset Yeomanry) Field Rgt to form 250 Queen's Own Dorset & West Somerset Yeomanry) Medium Rgt with RHQ at Yeovil. When the TA was reduced into the Territorial and Army Volunteer Reserve in 1967, part of this unit became B (West Somerset Yeomanry) Company at Yeovil in the Somerset Yeomanry and Light Infantry (Territorials) and ceased to be an artillery unit.

== Commanding officers ==
Commanding officers of the regiment included the following:

- Lt-Col W. Mallalieu – Outbreak of war
- Lt-Col R.D. Bolton– July 1942
- Lt-Col W.L. Newell, DSO – D-Day and Arnhem
- Lt-Col B. Wilson – VE Day

== Insignia ==
Unlike some Yeomanry regiments converted to artillery, it appears that the West Somerset Yeomanry did not retain their regimental cap badge and fully adopted RA badges. However, after World War II, 255 Medium Rgt wore a blue shoulder title with 'WSY' embroidered in yellow beneath the standard 'ROYAL ARTILLERY' embroidered in red. After the merger to form 250 Medium Rgt, this was changed to 'W.S.Y.&D.G'.
