= 134th (2/1st Hampshire) Brigade =

2nd/1st Hampshire Brigade 134th (2/1st Hampshire) Brigade 134th Infantry Brigade
- Active: October 1914 – September 1917; April 1939 – August 1944; September 1944 – March 1946
- Country: United Kingdom
- Branch: Territorial Force; Territorial Army
- Type: Infantry
- Size: Brigade
- Part of: 45th (2nd Wessex) Division; 45th Infantry Division
- Service: First World War; Second World War

The 134th Infantry Brigade was an infantry brigade of the Territorial Force, part of the British Army. It was formed in the First World War as a duplicate of the Hampshire Brigade and was originally formed as the 2nd/1st Hampshire Brigade in 1914–1915 before later being renamed as the 134th (2/1st Hampshire) Brigade. It was sent overseas to India in December 1914 to relieve Regular Army units for service in France. The brigade remained there for the rest of the war, supplying drafts of replacements to the British units fighting in the Middle East and later complete battalions. By September 1917 the last of its battalions had departed.

It was reformed as 134th Infantry Brigade in the Territorial Army in 1939, again as a duplicate formation, when another European conflict with Germany seemed inevitable. During the Second World War, the brigade was active in the United Kingdom throughout its service. It was disbanded on 15 August 1944.

The brigade was reformed on 1 September 1944 as part of the 45th (Holding) Division. It did not see service outside the United Kingdom during the war.

== History ==
=== First World War ===
In accordance with the Territorial and Reserve Forces Act 1907 (7 Edw. 7, c.9) which brought the Territorial Force into being, the TF was intended to be a home defence force for service during wartime and members could not be compelled to serve outside the country. However, on the outbreak of war on 4 August 1914, many members volunteered for Imperial Service. Therefore, TF units were split into 1st Line (liable for overseas service) and 2nd Line (home service for those unable or unwilling to serve overseas) units. 2nd Line units performed the home defence role, although in fact most of these were also posted abroad in due course.

On 15 August 1915, TF units were instructed to separate home service men from those who had volunteered for overseas service (1st Line), with the home service personnel to be formed into reserve units (2nd Line). On 31 August, 2nd Line units were authorized for each 1st Line unit where more than 60% of men had volunteered for overseas service. After being organized, armed and clothed, the 2nd Line units were gradually grouped into large formations thereby forming the 2nd Line brigades and divisions. These 2nd Line units and formations had the same name and structure as their 1st Line parents. On 24 November, it was decided to replace imperial service (1st Line) formations as they proceeded overseas with their reserve (2nd Line) formations. A second reserve (3rd Line) unit was then formed at the peace headquarters of the 1st Line.

The brigade was formed as a 2nd Line duplicate of the Hampshire Brigade in October 1914, shortly after the outbreak of war. It was assigned to the 2nd Wessex Division, the 2nd Line duplicate of the Wessex Division. The division was selected for service in India thereby releasing British and Indian regular battalions for service in Europe. On 12 December, the brigade embarked at Southampton with three battalions; the 2/4th Hampshires landed at Karachi on 9 January 1915 and the rest of the brigade at Bombay between 4 and 8 January.

The brigade was effectively broken up on arrival in India; the units reverted to peacetime conditions and the battalions were dispersed to Secunderabad (2) and Quetta. The Territorial Force divisions and brigades were numbered in May 1915 in the order that they departed for overseas service, starting with the 42nd (East Lancashire) Division. The 2nd Wessex Division should have been numbered as the 45th (2nd Wessex) Division, but as the division had already been broken up, this was merely a place holder. Likewise, the 2nd/1st Hampshire Brigade was notionally numbered as 134th (2/1st Hampshire) Brigade.

The units pushed on with training to prepare for active service, handicapped by the need to provide experienced manpower for active service units. By early 1916 it had become obvious that it would not be possible to transfer the division and brigade to the Western Front as originally intended. Nevertheless, individual units proceeded overseas on active service through the rest of the war. The 2/4th and 2/5th Hampshires served in the Sinai and Palestine Campaign from April and May 1917, and the 2/7th Hampshires in Mesopotamia from September 1917. At this point the brigade disappeared.

==== First World War units ====
The brigade commanded the following units:

- 2/4th Battalion, Hampshire Regiment was formed on Salisbury Plain in September 1914 and went to India with the brigade, arriving at Karachi on 11 January 1915. While in India, it served with the 2nd Quetta Brigade, 4th (Quetta) Division from January 1915 to April 1917. It landed at Suez on 15 May and joined the 233rd Brigade on formation on 25 May; the brigade joined the 75th Division on formation on 25 June. The battalion left the division on 2 May 1918 and disembarked at Marseille on 1 June. It joined the 62nd (2nd West Riding) Division on 6 June and was posted to the 186th (2/2nd West Riding) Brigade on 14 June. By the Armistice with Germany on 11 November 1918, the battalion was still with 186th Brigade, 62nd Division east of Maubeuge, France.
- 2/5th Battalion, Hampshire Regiment was formed on Salisbury Plain in September 1914 and went to India with the brigade, arriving at Bombay on 4 January 1915. While in India, it served with the Secunderabad Brigade, 9th (Secunderabad) Division from January 1915 to March 1917. It landed at Suez on 5 April and joined the 232nd Brigade on formation on 14 April; the brigade joined the 75th Division on formation on 25 June. The battalion was disbanded in Palestine between 3 and 13 August 1918; it posted 5 officers and 300 men to the 1/4th Battalion, Wiltshire Regiment.
- 2/6th Battalion, Hampshire Regiment was formed at Portsmouth in September 1914. It did not go to India with the division. It was stationed variously at Petersfield, Bournemouth and Hursley Park before being absorbed into the 5th (Reserve) Battalion, Hampshire Regiment (former 3/5th Battalion) on 1 September 1916.
- 2/7th Battalion, Hampshire Regiment was formed at Bournemouth (Note: Historically part of Hampshire, Bournemouth was transferred to Dorset as a result of the Local Government Act 1972.) in September 1914 and went to India with the brigade, arriving at Bombay between 4 and 8 January 1915. While in India, it served with the Secunderabad Brigade, 9th (Secunderabad) Division (January 1915 to March 1916) and Jubbulpore Brigade, 5th (Mhow) Division (March 1916 to August 1917). It went to Mesopotamia, arriving at Basra on 11 September, and was initially on Lines of Communication duties. In September 1918, it was attached to 38th Brigade, 13th (Western) Division. (Note: Becke says that the 2/7th Hampshires was attached to the 40th Brigade, 13th (Western) Division from September 1918 to 27 December 1918.) At the Armistice of Mudros that ended the war with the Ottoman Empire on 30 October 1918 it was still attached to 38th Brigade, 13th Division near Delli Abbas north-east of Baghdad.

=== Second World War ===
By 1939 it became clear that a new European war was likely to break out and, as a direct result of the German invasion of Czechoslovakia on 15 March, the doubling of the Territorial Army was authorised, with each unit and formation forming a duplicate. Consequently, 134th Infantry Brigade was formed in April 1939 as part of the 45th Infantry Division, duplicate of the 43rd (Wessex) Infantry Division. Unusually, it was not a mirror of its parent, the 43rd and 45th Divisions being organized on a geographical basis. (Note: Units from Cornwall, Devon and south Somerset (both the original units and their duplicates) joined the new 45th Infantry Division, whereas those from north Somerset, Dorset, Hampshire and Wiltshire remained with the 43rd (Wessex) Infantry Division.) Initially, the brigade was administered by the 43rd Division until the 45th Division began to function from 7 September 1939.

The brigade remained in the United Kingdom with the 45th Division during the Second World War and did not see active service overseas. In July 1944, the brigade started to disperse as its component units were posted away, a process that was completed on 15 August and the brigade disbanded.

The brigade was reformed on 1 September 1944 by the redesignation of 203rd Infantry Brigade. It served with the 45th (Holding) Division for the rest of the war.

==== Second World War units ====
The brigade commanded the following units:

- 4th Battalion, Devonshire Regiment – until 17 May 1940; 28 December 1943 to 3 April 1944; 10 to 31 July 1944
- 6th Battalion, Devonshire Regiment – until 30 July 1944
- 8th Battalion, Devonshire Regiment – until 3 January 1943
- 134th Infantry Brigade Anti-Tank Company – formed 19 June 1940, disbanded 21 January 1941 (Note: 45th Reconnaissance Battalion was formed in January 1941 from the 134th, 135th and 136th Infantry Brigade Anti-Tank Companies. It later formed 45 and 54 Columns of the Chindits.)
- 1st Battalion, Royal Irish Fusiliers – from 27 June until 17 November 1940
- 9th Battalion, Devonshire Regiment – from 17 November 1940 until 23 September 1942
- 9th Battalion, Dorsetshire Regiment – from 7 October 1942 until 28 December 1943
- 2nd Battalion, East Surrey Regiment – from 3 January 1943 until 30 July 1944
- 5th Battalion, Somerset Light Infantry (Prince Albert's) – from 10 to 31 July 1944
- 1st Battalion, Duke of Cornwall's Light Infantry – from 16 to 31 July 1944

After being reformed by the redesignation of 203rd Infantry Brigade, the brigade commanded:

- 11th Battalion, South Staffordshire Regiment – from 16 October 1943 to 14 November 1944
- 7th Battalion, Royal Ulster Rifles – from 15 November 1943
- 11th Battalion, Argyll and Sutherland Highlanders – from 23 July 1944
- 2/6th Battalion, Lancashire Fusiliers – from 25 July 1944
- 14th Battalion, Durham Light Infantry – from 15 November 1944

== Commanders ==
=== During the First World War ===
The brigade was commanded from formation until embarkation for India by Br.-Gen. G.H. Nicholson. Br.-Gen. Nicholson commanded the 45th Division on its voyage; he handed over the troops on disembarkation and returned to England, arriving on 3 February 1915. Previously, he had been a Colonel commanding the 1st Line Hampshire Brigade at the outbreak of the war until it departed for India.

=== During the Second World War ===
The brigade had the following commanders in the Second World War:

From	Rank	Name	Notes
3 September 1939	Brig	W.G. Michelmore	from the outbreak of the war
30 October 1941	Brig	W. Carden Roe	until 15 August 1944
1 August 1944	Brig	J. H. Hogshaw	as commander of 203rd Brigade

== See also ==
- 128th (Hampshire) Brigade for the 1st Line formation
- British infantry brigades of the First World War
- British brigades of the Second World War

== Bibliography ==
- Becke, Archibald F. (1936). Order of Battle of Divisions Part 2A. The Territorial Force Mounted Divisions and the 1st-Line Territorial Force Divisions (42–56). London: HMSO. OCLC 4405016.
- Becke, Archibald F. (1937). Order of Battle of Divisions Part 2B. The 2nd-Line Territorial Force Divisions (57th–69th) with The Home-Service Divisions (71st–73rd) and 74th and 75th Divisions. London: HMSO. OCLC 4405016.
- Becke, Archibald F. (1938). Order of Battle of Divisions Part 3A. New Army Divisions (9–26). London: HMSO. OCLC 4405016.
- Bellis, Malcolm A. (1994). Regiments of the British Army 1939–1945 (Armour & Infantry). London: Military Press International. ISBN 0-85420-999-9.
- James, E.A. (1978). British Regiments 1914–18. London: Samson Books Limited. ISBN 0-906304-03-2.
- Joslen, H. F. (2003) [1960]. Orders of Battle: Second World War, 1939–1945. Uckfield, East Sussex: Naval and Military Press. ISBN 978-1-84342-474-1.
- Perry, F.W. (1993). Order of Battle of Divisions Part 5B. Indian Army Divisions. Newport: Ray Westlake Military Books. ISBN 1-871167-23-X.
- Rinaldi, Richard A (2008). Order of Battle of the British Army 1914. Ravi Rikhye. ISBN 978-0-97760728-0.
- Westlake, Ray (1986). The Territorial Battalions, A Pictorial History, 1859–1985. Tunbridge Wells: Spellmount.
