= 148th Infantry Brigade =

3rd West Riding Brigade 148th (3rd West Riding) Brigade 148th Infantry Brigade 148th Independent Infantry Brigade
- Patch worn by the 148th Independent Infantry Brigade (November 1940 to July 1942).
- Active: 1908–1919; 1920–1946
- Country: United Kingdom
- Branch: Territorial Army
- Type: Infantry
- Size: Brigade
- Part of: 49th (West Riding) Infantry Division
- Engagements: First World War; Second World War

Insignia
- Battle patches worn by the infantry battalions of the brigade in 1917.: (l-r) 1/4th, 15th K.O.Y.L.I., 1/4th, 1/5th York and lancaster Regiment.

The 148th Infantry Brigade was an infantry brigade formation of the British Army that served in both the First and briefly in the Second World War as part of the 49th (West Riding) Infantry Division and disbanded after the war.

== History ==
=== Formation ===
The brigade was raised in 1908 upon the creation of the Territorial Force, which was formed by the amalgamation of the Yeomanry and the Volunteer Force. The 3rd West Riding Brigade was assigned to the West Riding Division. The brigade consisted of two volunteer battalions of the King's Own (Yorkshire Light Infantry) and two of the York and Lancaster Regiment.

=== First World War ===
The division was mobilised shortly after the outbreak of war and started training. In 1915 the division became the 49th (West Riding) Infantry Division and the brigade was numbered 148th (1/3rd West Riding) Brigade. The battalions adopted the '1/' prefix (for example, 1/4th KOYLI) to differentiate them from their 2nd Line units being formed. The 2nd Line consisted of the few men who did not volunteer to serve overseas and was intended to act as home service and as a reserve for the 1st Line. The 2nd Line units were 187th (2/3rd West Riding) Brigade, 62nd (2nd West Riding) Division. With the 49th Division, the 148th Brigade saw service on the Western Front during the First World War from 1915 to 1918.

==== Order of battle ====
- 1/4th Battalion, King's Own (Yorkshire Light Infantry)
- 1/5th Battalion, King's Own Yorkshire Light Infantry (left February 1918)
- 1/4th Battalion, York and Lancaster Regiment
- 1/5th Battalion, York and Lancaster Regiment
- 148th Machine Gun Company, Machine Gun Corps (formed 6 February 1916, moved to 49th Battalion, Machine Gun Corps 1 March 1918)
- 148th Trench Mortar Battery (formed 12 June 1916)

Due to a shortage of manpower in the British Expeditionary Force (BEF) it was decided to reduce all British divisions serving on the Western Front from twelve to nine infantry battalions, all brigades reducing from four to three, and so the 1/5th KOYLI was transferred from 148th Brigade to the 187th (2/3rd) West Riding Brigade of 62nd (2nd West Riding) Division where they amalgamated with the 2/5th KOYLI and were renamed the 5th Battalion.

=== Inter-war period ===
Disbanded after the war, the brigade was reformed in the Territorial Army as the 148th (3rd West Riding) Infantry Brigade and continued to serve with 49th Division, which was also reformed. The brigade had the same composition it did before the First World War.

However, during the years shortly before the Second World War, all of the brigade's original battalions were converted to other roles or were gradually posted away. The 5th Battalion, King's Own Yorkshire Light Infantry was transferred to the Royal Artillery and became 53rd Light Anti-Aircraft Regiment, Royal Artillery and 5th Battalion, York and Lancaster Regiment were also transferred to the Royal Artillery and converted into 67th (The York and Lancaster) Anti-Aircraft Brigade, Royal Artillery and joined the 31st (North Midland) Anti-Aircraft Group, 2nd Anti-Aircraft Division. The remaining units, 4th Battalion, KOYLI and 4th (Hallamshire) Battalion, York and Lancs, were transferred to the 146th (2nd West Riding) Infantry Brigade of the 49th Division. They were replaced in the 148th Brigade by the 5th Battalion, Leicestershire Regiment and 5th and 8th battalions of the Sherwood Foresters, all from the disbanded 46th (North Midland) Division (converted into 2nd AA Division). In 1939 the brigade was redesignated 148th Infantry Brigade.

=== Second World War ===
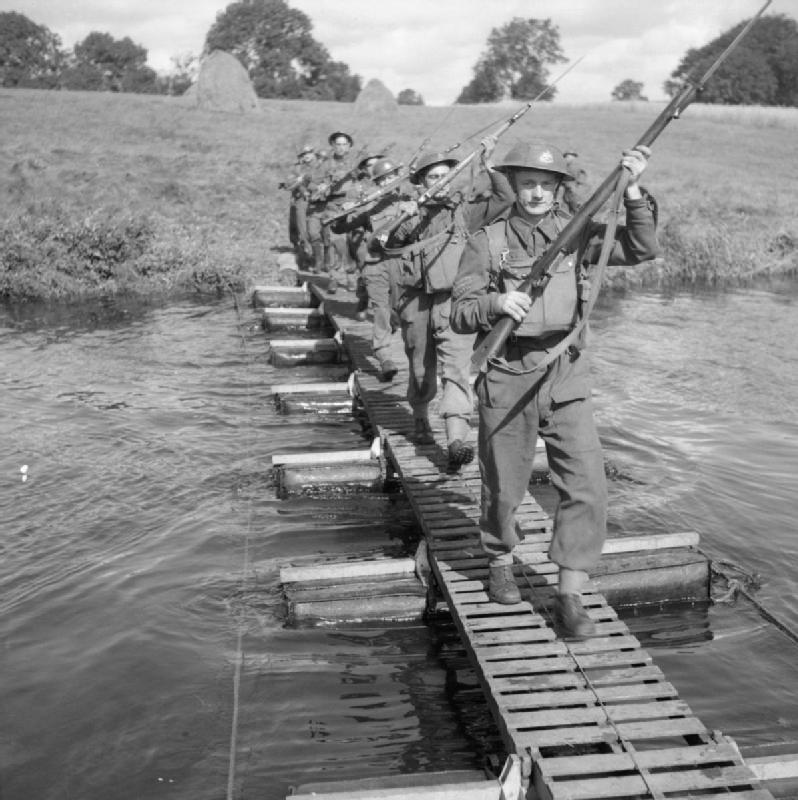
Men of the 8th Battalion, Sherwood Foresters cross a river using a small kapok pontoon bridge, Dunadry in Northern Ireland, 28 August 1941.

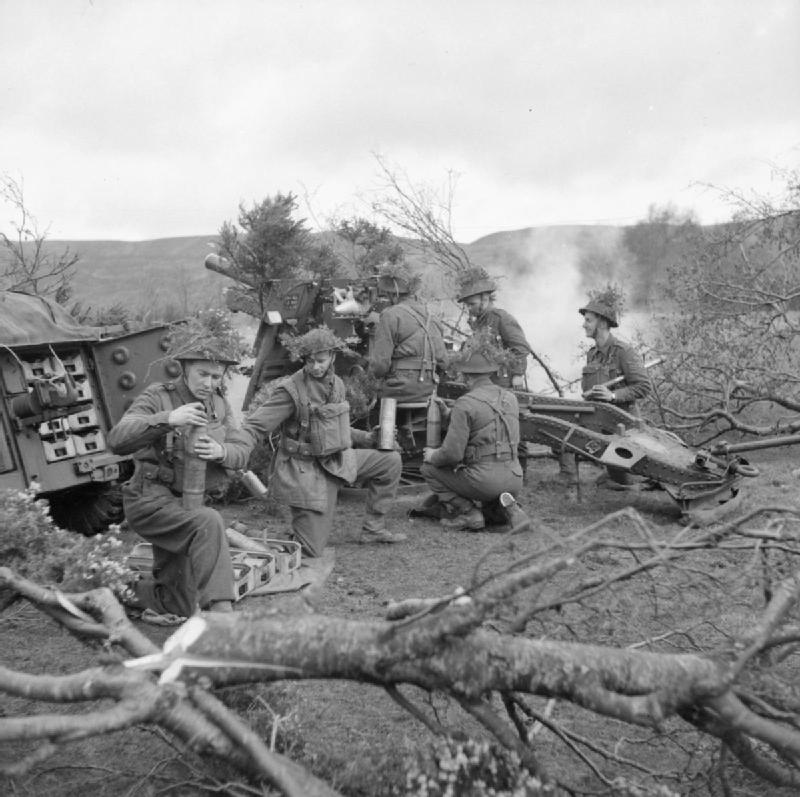
A 25-pounder field gun of the 150th Field Regiment, Royal Artillery, 148th Independent Infantry Brigade Group, firing during Exercise 'Dragoon' in the Sperrin Mountains near Draperstown in Northern Ireland, 1 April 1942.

With the rest of the 49th Division, the brigade was mobilised on 1 September 1939, after the German Army's invasion of Poland. The Second World War began two days later.

In October the 1/5th Battalion, Sherwood Foresters was transferred to the 55th Infantry Brigade of the 18th Infantry Division and was replaced by the 2nd Battalion, South Wales Borderers, a Regular Army unit. The 148th Brigade, together with most of the rest of the 49th Division, was both poorly trained and equipped and was sent with most of the division to Norway and fought in the Norwegian Campaign, suffering heavy casualties, in early 1940 before being withdrawn.

Instead of being sent to Iceland with the rest of the 49th Division, the brigade was sent to Northern Ireland, coming under command of British Troops Northern Ireland from 7 July 1940 until 26 April 1942, to counter a potential German invasion. It was later redesignated 148th Independent Infantry Brigade, complete with its own independent support units. The brigade was reorganised as a training brigade on 25 July 1942 for pre-OCU training of all OCTU candidates for the Army and, as a result, the independent support units were gradually posted away.

==== Order of battle ====
The 148th Brigade was constituted as follows during the war:

- 1/5th Battalion, Leicestershire Regiment (until 24 July 1942)
- 1/5th Battalion, Sherwood Foresters (until 29 October 1939)
- 8th Battalion, Sherwood Foresters (until 24 July 1942)
- 2nd Battalion, South Wales Borderers (from 18 December 1939 until 1 April 1940, rejoined 6 December 1940 until 6 December 1941)
- 148th Infantry Brigade Anti-Tank Company (formed 4 August 1940 until 7 January 1941)
- 1st Battalion, Oxfordshire and Buckinghamshire Light Infantry (from 8 January 1941 until 20 July 1942)
- 4th Battalion, Royal Berkshire Regiment (from 17 December 1940 until 24 July 1942)
- 150th Field Regiment, Royal Artillery (from 23 November 1940 until 24 July 1942)
- 266th Independent Anti-Tank Company (from 10 March 1941 until 24 July 1942)
- 507th Field Company, Royal Engineers (from 29 November 1940 until 24 July 1942)
- A Company, 5th Battalion, Cheshire Regiment (Machine Gun Company) (from 13 until 31 December 1940)
- 148th Independent Infantry Brigade Machine Gun Company (Cheshire Regiment) (from 1 January 1941 until 20 July 1942)
- 148th Independent Infantry Brigade Reconnaissance Squadron, Reconnaissance Corps (from 6 June 1942 until 24 July 1942)

==== Commanders ====
The following officers commanded the 148th Infantry Brigade during the war:

- Brigadier D.M.A. Sole (until 22 February 1940)
- Brigadier H. de R. Morgan (from 22 February 1940 until 23 April 1941)
- Lieutenant-Colonel C.B. Callander (Acting, from 23 April until 27 May 1941)
- Brigadier H.B. Hibbert (from 27 May until 29 May 1942)
- Brigadier J.K. Edwards (from 29 May 1942)

== Bibliography ==
- Cole, Howard (1973). Formation Badges of World War 2 Britain, Commonwealth and Empire. London: Arms and Armour Press.
- Hibbard, Mike; Gibbs, Gary (2016). Infantry Divisions, Identification Schemes 1917 (1 ed.). Wokingham: The Military History Society.
- Joslen, H. F. (2003) [1960]. Orders of Battle: Second World War, 1939–1945. Uckfield, East Sussex: Naval and Military Press. ISBN 978-1-84342-474-1.
