= Drake's Drum =

Allegedly magic drum

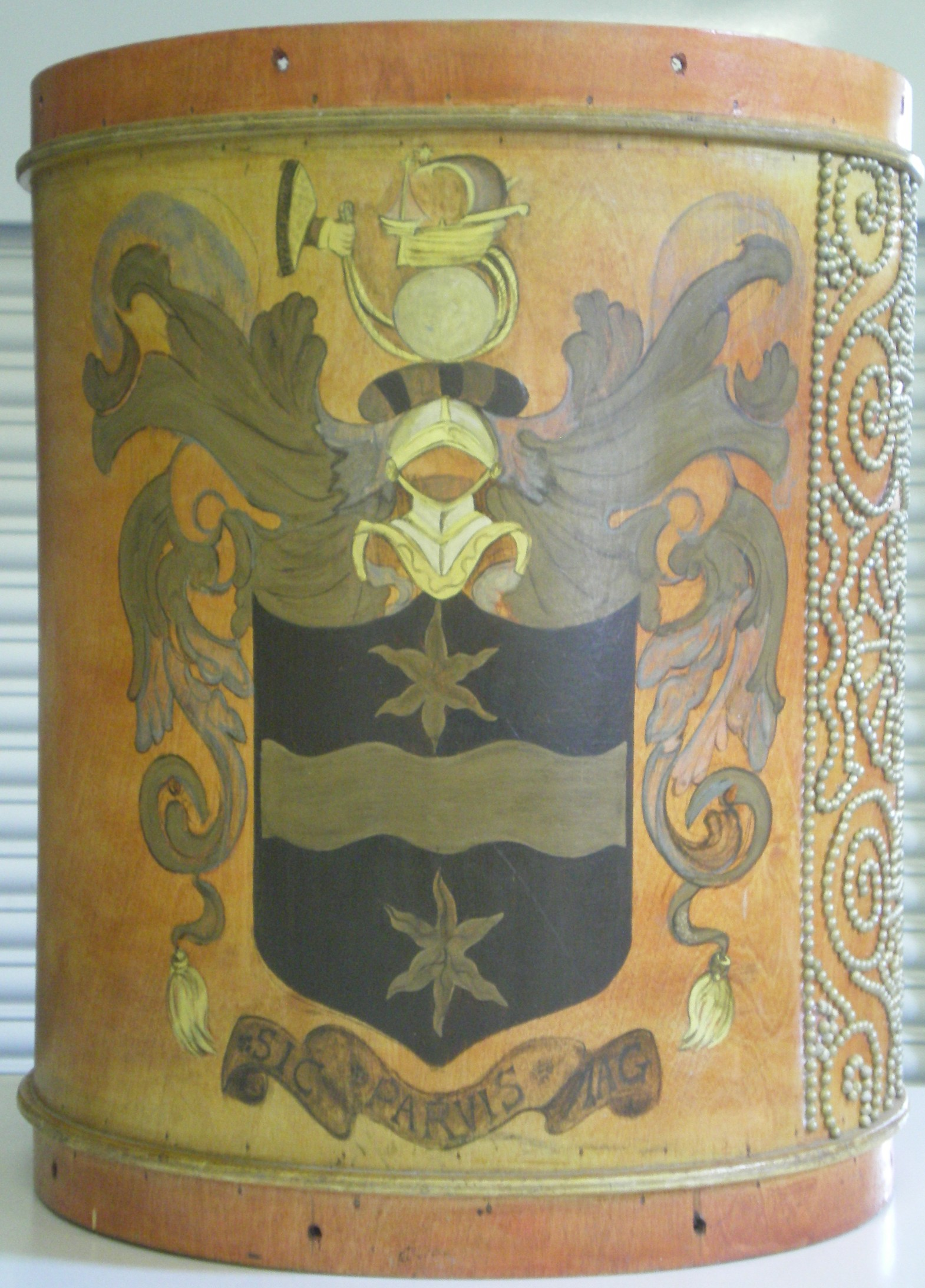
Replica of Drake's Drum, from the Buckland Abbey education centre

Drake's Drum is a snare drum that Sir Francis Drake took with him when he circumnavigated the world. Shortly before he died he ordered the drum to be taken to Buckland Abbey and vowed that if England were ever in danger and someone was to beat the drum he would return to defend the country. According to legend it can be heard to beat at times when England is at war or significant national events take place.

== History ==
Drake is said to have taken the drum, emblazoned with his coat of arms, with him on his voyages around the world between 1577 and 1580. It was still with him for his final voyage and as he lay on his death bed off the coast of Panama in 1596 he ordered the drum returned to England, where in times of trouble it should be beaten to recall him from heaven to rescue the country.

Following his death the drum was returned to Drake's family home of Buckland Abbey in Buckland Monachorum, Devon. A replica of the drum remains on public display at Buckland Abbey under the care of the National Trust.

The Drake's Drum on display is a replica made by Mr J Manning, art and display officer at Plymouth Museum. The original drum, being fragile, is stored in a climate controlled store in central England. Another replica, also made by Mr Manning, is kept in storage. Both replicas were made in Plymouth from historically authentic materials.

== Cultural impact ==
Take my drum to England, hang et by the shore, Strike et when your powder’s runnin’ low; If the Dons sight Devon, I’ll quit the port o’ Heaven, An’ drum them up the Channel as we drummed them long ago.

— From Drake’s Drum by Sir Henry Newbolt

The drum has become an icon of English folklore with its variation of the classic king asleep in mountain story. Several times throughout history, people have claimed to have heard the drum beating, including: when the Mayflower left Plymouth for America in 1620, when Admiral Lord Nelson was made a freeman of Plymouth, when Napoleon was brought into Plymouth Harbour as a prisoner, and when World War I first began in 1914 and when HMS Revenge was closed down and at the point of sailing, as part of the Grand Fleet, before the Battle of Jutland.

Reportedly, on HMS Royal Oak, a victory drum roll from a drum was heard when the Imperial German Navy surrendered in 1918. The ship was then searched twice by the officers and then again by the captain and neither a drum nor a drummer was found on board; eventually the phenomenon was put down to the legendary drum.

In 1938, when Buckland Abbey was partly destroyed by fire, the drum was rescued and taken to safety at Buckfast Abbey. Plymouth was devastated in the air raids that followed, reminding some of the ancient legend that “If Drake’s Drum should be moved from its rightful home, the city will fall”. The drum was returned and the city remained safe for the rest of the war.

Formation badge of the 45th Infantry Division

The drum was most recently reported to have been heard in 1940 at the Dunkirk evacuation during World War II. In 1940 the 45th Infantry Division, which included 4th and 5th Battalions of The Duke of Cornwall's Light Infantry and the 9th Battalion The Devonshire Regiment, took Drake's Drum as their emblem. This emblem was painted on their transport.

Drake's Drum has been the title and subject of poems by Sir Henry Newbolt and the Victorian poet Norah M. Holland. Newbolt's poem was set to music by Charles Villiers Stanford as part of his Songs of the Sea, op.91 suite2. It was popularised by Peter Dawson. The setting is in the key of D minor, with a dramatic resolution to D major.

The drum was also mentioned in Bernard Cornwell's 1988 novel Sharpe's Rifles as analogous to the Gonfalon of Santiago Matamoros that features heavily in the story. A composition called "Drake's Drum" can also be heard on the album by British instrumental band Acoustic Alchemy, Natural Elements (1988). Drake's Drum is mentioned in the Sabbat song "Behind the Crooked Cross" from their 1988 album History of a Time to Come. It features in Katherine Kurtz's World War II supernatural novel Lammas Night.

There is a short road named "Drakes Drum Drive" in Bryn Mawr, Pennsylvania.
