= 45th Infantry Division (United Kingdom) =

Infantry division of the British Army

45th Infantry Division 45th (Holding) Division 45th Division
- The divisional insignia, Drake's Drum, denoting the association of the division with the West Country region.
- Active: 7 September 1939 – 15 August 1944; 1 September 1944 – c. December 1945
- Branch: Territorial Army (1939–1944); British Army (1944–1945)
- Type: Infantry
- Role: Infantry, home defence, and training

Commanders
- Notable commanders: Major-General Frederick Witts

The 45th Infantry Division was an infantry division of the British Army, formed just prior to the start of the Second World War. In March 1939, after the re-emergence of Germany as a significant military power and its occupation of Czechoslovakia, the British Army increased the number of divisions in the Territorial Army (TA) by duplicating existing units. The 45th started forming in August 1939 and became active the following month, as a second-line duplicate of the 43rd (Wessex) Infantry Division. The division's battalions were all raised in the West Country.

It was intended that the division would remain in the United Kingdom to complete training and preparation, before being deployed to France within twelve months of the war breaking out. Instead, the division was largely dispersed in order to protect strategically important points. As a result of the rapid German victory on mainland Europe during the Battle of France in 1940, the division was not deployed overseas and was instead dispatched to Sussex to defend the coast from a potential German invasion. This mission was extended to cover sections of the Kent coastline, and was followed by stints defending Essex and being held back from the coast as a counter-attack formation. In December 1941, the division was earmarked to remain within the UK and not be deployed overseas as a combat formation. This was followed by further periods of coastal defence, and training in Northern Ireland. In 1944, the division's manpower was slowly transferred away as it was used to reinforce combat formations within the 21st Army Group, and the division was disbanded in August 1944.

The division was reformed in September as the 45th (Holding) Division, composed of personnel from the disbanded 77th (Holding) Division. In this capacity the division was responsible for retraining soldiers on medical leave or who had spent a large amount of time overseas or as prisoners of war and assigning soldiers to new units. In December 1945, the division was renamed the 45th Division. Shortly after, it had three new brigades attached, all with the function of helping with the influx of returning soldiers from overseas deployment. As part of the demobilisation of the British armed forces after the Second World War, the division ceased to exist by the end of 1945 and has not been reformed.

== Background ==
During the 1930s, tensions increased between Germany and the United Kingdom and its allies. In late 1937 and throughout 1938, German demands for the annexation of Sudetenland in Czechoslovakia led to an international crisis. To avoid war, the British Prime Minister Neville Chamberlain met with German Chancellor Adolf Hitler in September and brokered the Munich Agreement. The agreement averted a war and allowed Germany to annexe the Sudetenland. Although Chamberlain had intended the agreement to lead to further peaceful resolution of issues, relations between both countries soon deteriorated. On 15 March 1939, Germany breached the terms of the agreement by invading and occupying the remnants of the Czech state.

On 29 March, British Secretary of State for War Leslie Hore-Belisha announced plans to increase the part-time Territorial Army (TA) from 130,000 to 340,000 men and double the number of TA divisions. (Note: The Territorial Army (TA) was a reserve of the British regular army made up of part-time volunteers. By 1939, its intended role was the sole method of expanding the size of the British Armed Forces. (This is comparable to the creation of Kitchener's Army during the First World War.) Existing territorial formations would create a second division using a cadre of trained personnel and, if needed, a third division would be created. All TA recruits were required to take the general service obligation: if the British Government decided, territorial soldiers could be deployed overseas for combat. (This avoided the complications of the First World War-era Territorial Force, whose members were not required to leave Britain unless they volunteered for overseas service.)) The plan was for existing TA divisions, referred to as the first-line, to recruit over their allowed complements (aided by an increase in pay for Territorials, the removal of restrictions on promotion which had hindered recruiting, construction of better-quality barracks and an increase in supper rations) and then form a new division, known as the second-line, from cadres around which the divisions could be expanded. This process was dubbed "duplicating". The 45th Division was to be a second-line unit, a duplicate of the first-line 43rd (Wessex) Infantry Division. It was envisioned that the duplicating process and recruiting the required numbers of men would take no more than six months. Some TA divisions had made little progress by the time the Second World War began; others were able to complete this work within a matter of weeks. In April, limited conscription was introduced. This resulted in 34,500 twenty-year-old men being conscripted into the regular army, initially to be trained for six months before deployment to the forming second-line units.

== History ==
=== Formation and home defence ===
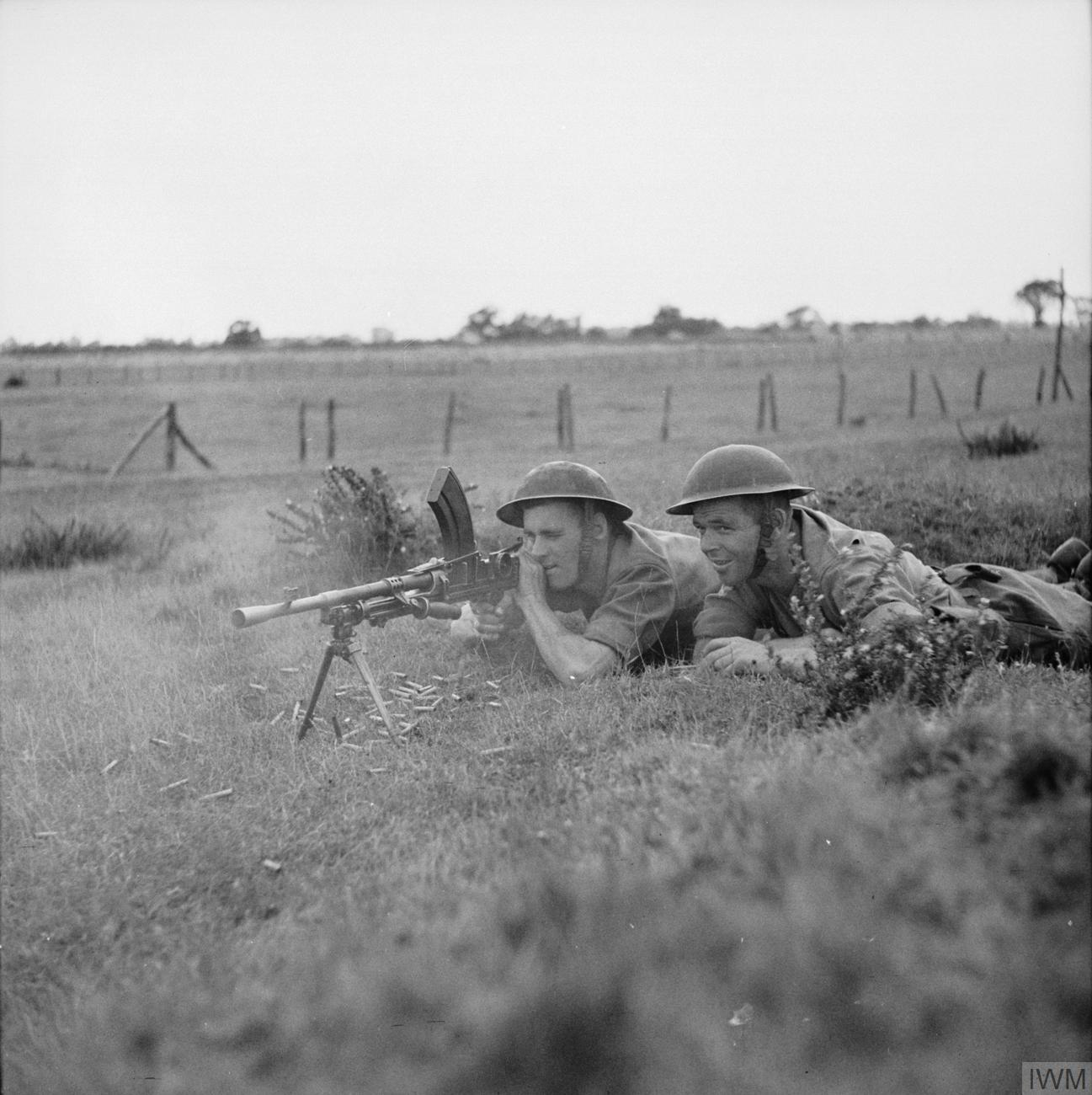
Men of the division firing a Bren light machine gun during training.

On 28 August 1939, the embryo of the division was formed. Major-General Frederick Witts, formally a staff officer in the British Indian Army's Western Command with experience commanding an infantry brigade, was assigned as the General Officer Commanding (GOC). It was not until 7 September that the 45th Infantry Division became active. At that point, it took control of the 134th, 135th, and 136th Infantry Brigades, in addition to supporting divisional units, which had previously been administered by the 43rd (Wessex) Infantry Division. Due to the lack of official guidance, the newly formed units were at liberty to choose numbers, styles, and titles. The division adopted the number, but not the title, of their First World War counterpart, the 45th (2nd Wessex) Division; furthermore, the battalions that made up the division were largely unrelated to their parent unit. The 134th Brigade initially consisted of the 4th, the 6th, and the 8th Battalions, Devonshire Regiment (DR); the 135th Infantry Brigade was made up of the 5th, the 6th, and the 7th Battalions, Somerset Light Infantry; and the 136th Brigade consisted of the 9th Battalion, DR, and the 4th and the 5th Battalions, Duke of Cornwall's Light Infantry. To denote the association of the division with the West Country, where the division's battalions were raised, its insignia referred to Devon born Sir Francis Drake's Drum: according to the Imperial War Museum, "A yellow drum, red bands top and bottom, white cords, a small red diamond above a dark blue half circle in the centre, all on a khaki ground." The division was assigned to Southern Command, and largely dispersed to guard strategically vital areas.

It was envisioned that the TA divisions each be deployed intact to reinforce the British Expeditionary Force (BEF) in France as equipment became available, with all 26 TA divisions deployed by the end of the first year of the war. The deployment timetable called for waves being sent to France in the fourth, fifth, sixth, ninth, and twelfth months of the war. By February 1940, the 45th Division had been earmarked for the fourth contingent of TA divisions to be deployed. To do so, the division was to be concentrated to complete its training; a process that had thus far been complicated by having 2,600 of the division's troops assigned to guarding vulnerable points. In May 1940, due to the swift nature of the German operations on mainland Europe, Commander-in-Chief, Home Forces General Walter Kirke grew concerned over the threat posed by the Germans to South East England. As a result, the division was assigned to Eastern Command and deployed to Sussex to defend the coast. As a consequence of the German victory in the Battle of France and the return of the BEF following the Dunkirk evacuation, the division was not deployed overseas.

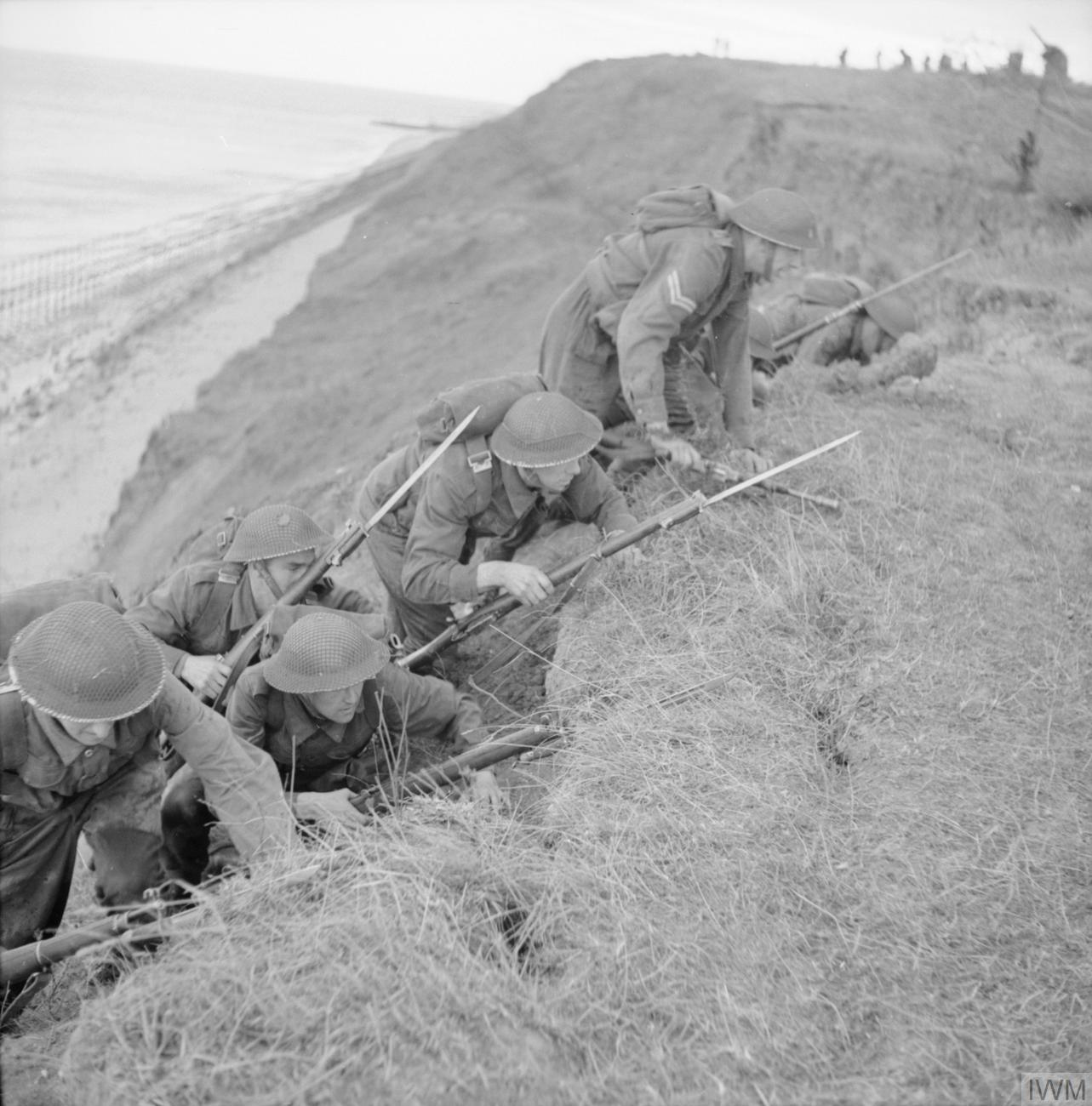
Members of the division scale an Essex cliff during training

On 25 May, the 135th Brigade (based at Romney Marsh) was temporarily attached to the 1st London Division. (Note: Following the return of the British Army from France, it began implementing lessons learnt from the campaign. This included a decision that the standard division would be based around three brigades, and the abandonment of the motor division concept. This process involved the break up of four-second-line territorial divisions to reinforce depleted formations and aid in transforming the Army's five motor divisions, each made up of two brigades, into infantry divisions made up of three brigades. This included the break-up of the 23rd (Northumbrian) Division at the end of June. One of its brigades was allocated to the 1st London Division, and following which the 135th Brigade reverted to the 45th Division.) A British infantry division was allocated seventy-two 25-pounder field guns. On 31 May, the division had 12 such modern guns, in addition to six First World War-vintage 18-pounder field guns, and twelve 4.5 in (110 mm) howitzers of similar vintage. The division had only six anti-tank guns, against a nominal establishment of 48, and only 154 of the required 307 Boys anti-tank rifles. It had 590 Bren light machine guns, compared to an establishment of 644. In regards to Universal Carriers, it had 63 instead of the required 140, these were supplemented with a number of Humber Light Reconnaissance Cars. In June, a Home Guard memorandum described the division as consisting of "two weak Brigades [134th and 136th] disposed on the coast", with orders to "hold their positions 'to the last man and the last cartridge' ", and supplemented by Home Guard volunteers "manning barricades consisting of tree trunks, old motor cars, farm carts and barbed-wire trestles on the main approaches to towns and villages". British defensive thinking ideally called for a division to be deployed with two brigades forward, each with two battalions in coastal positions and the third positioned around 6 miles (9.7 km) inland to provide a counter-attack force. The third brigade would be positioned further inland to provide an additional counter-attacking force and in particular to retake airfields lost to German paratroopers. However, this layout was rare. With the return of the 135th Brigade on 10 July, the 45th Division was also given responsibility for coastal defence into Kent. From west to east, the 136th Brigade was based around the potential landing zones near Eastbourne, the 134th Brigade covered the coast between Bexhill-on-Sea and Hastings, and the 135th Brigade was responsible for the area between Rye and Dymchurch. The division was placed under the command of XII Corps. By September, the 2nd New Zealand Division had been placed behind the 45th Division, to counter-attack any German force that assaulted the 45th Division's position.

Assigned to I Corps in November, the division was moved off the south coast to Nottinghamshire. It was then placed directly under the command of Home Forces, and rotated between coastal defence duties in Essex and maintaining a position in the English hinterlands as a counter-attack formation. In July, the division was placed under the command of XI Corps. In December, the division was placed on the lower establishment and was deployed to the Essex coastline in 1942. (Note: During the war, divisions of the British Army were divided between being listed as higher establishment formations, and lower establishment ones. The former were intended for deployment overseas and combat, whereas the latter were restricted to home defence in a static role.) After a year in this position, during March 1943, the division deployed to Northern Ireland, where elements were based in County Down. This deployment was used for training. This deployment lasted until December 1943, when the division was again placed directly under the command of Home Forces and returned to the mainland. The division's moves to and from Northern Ireland were leaked through double agents as part of Operation Fortitude. The division then moved to Sussex, and started to supply drafts of men to higher establishment divisions. By mid-1944, the five lower establishment divisions allocated to home defence duties (the 38th (Welsh), the 45th, the 47th (London), the 55th (West Lancashire), and the 61st) had a combined total of 17,845 men. Of this number, around 13,000 were available as replacements for the 21st Army Group fighting in France. (Note: The war establishment – the paper strength – of a higher establishment infantry division at this point in the war was 18,347 men.) The remaining 4,800 men were considered ineligible at that time for service abroad for a variety of reasons, including a lack of training or being medically unfit. Over the following six months, up to 75 per cent of these men were deployed to reinforce 21st Army Group following the completion of their training and certification of fitness. On 15 August, what was left of the division was dispersed. This process took until the end of the month, at which point the division and its brigades were disbanded.

=== Holding Division and end of the war ===
During 1944, the British Army suffered a severe shortage of manpower. In an effort to downsize the army, while efficiently maintaining as many formations as possible at full strength, the War Office began disbanding divisions. As part of this restructure, the decision was made to retain division numbers familiar to the British public due to their potential recruiting value. As a result, the 77th (Holding) Division was disbanded. Its GOC Major-General Godwin Michelmore and his staff reformed the division as the 45th (Holding) Division on 1 September. As part of this re-establishment, the 45th Division's brigades were reformed. The 134th Brigade was reformed from the redesignation of the 203rd Infantry Brigade, and the 135th Brigade was recreated from the 209th Infantry Brigade. Lieutenant-Colonel H.F. Joslen wrote that the division's role was now "for sorting, retraining and holding personnel temporarily – due to disbandments, medical and other causes." For example, the 14th Battalion, Durham Light Infantry maintained a rehabilitation centre. Ex-prisoners of war, repatriates, troops who were suffering from morale issues or of low physique were sent to the battalion where they underwent medical, physical, and military tests. These tests were designed to establish what medical category the soldiers should be assigned, and what job or military capability would best suit them.

On 1 December 1944, the division was renamed the 45th Division. On 1 February 1945, a new 136th Infantry Brigade was formed and attached to the division. This was followed by a new 137th Brigade on 28 March, and the 178th Brigade on 21 April. Joslen describes these brigades as being "for the reception and training of personnel returned from overseas temporarily unfit from wounds and other causes." These brigades had no specific battalions assigned to them, instead, according to Joslen, "the Units of the Bde were Reception Camps and Selection and Training Battalions." The 178th Brigade was disbanded in August. In the aftermath of the war, the British Army demobilised, which included the 45th Division. The TA was reformed in 1947 on a much smaller scale of nine divisions, which did not include the 45th. (Note: The 16th Airborne Division, the 49th (West Riding) and 56th (London) Armoured Divisions and the 42nd (Lancashire), 43rd (Wessex), 44th (Home Counties), 50th (Northumbrian), 51st/52nd (Scottish), and 53rd (Welsh) infantry divisions.)

== General officers commanding ==
Appointed	General officer commanding
7 September 1939	Major-General Frederick Witts (Note: Witts became GOC on 28 August 1939, but the division did not become active until 7 September.)
5 February 1940	Major-General Desmond Anderson
12 May 1940	Major-General Edmond Schreiber
25 April 1941	Brigadier Harold de Riemer Morgan (acting)
8 May 1941	Major-General Harold de Riemer Morgan
12 January 1943	Major-General John Edwards
1 September 1944	Major-General Godwin Michelmore

== Order of battle ==
45th Infantry Division (1939–1944)

134th Infantry Brigade

- 4th Battalion, Devonshire Regiment (until 17 May 1940; 28 December 1943 to 3 April 1944; 10 July to 31 July 1944)
- 6th Battalion, Devonshire Regiment
- 8th Battalion, Devonshire Regiment (until 3 January 1943)
- 134th Infantry Brigade Anti-Tank Company (from 19 June 1940; joined 45th Reconnaissance Battalion 21 January 1941)
- 1st Battalion, Royal Irish Fusiliers (from 27 June, until 17 November 1940)
- 9th Battalion, Devonshire Regiment (from 17 November 1940, until 23 September 1942)
- 9th Battalion, Dorsetshire Regiment (from 7 October 1942, until 28 December 1943)
- 2nd Battalion, East Surrey Regiment (from 3 January 1943)
- 5th Battalion, Somerset Light Infantry (from 10 July 1944)
- 1st Battalion, Duke of Cornwall's Light Infantry (from 16 July 1944)

135th Infantry Brigade

- 5th Battalion, Somerset Light Infantry
- 6th Battalion, Somerset Light Infantry
- 7th Battalion, Somerset Light Infantry (until 11 September 1942)
- 135th Infantry Brigade Anti-Tank Company (from 19 June 1940, joined 45th Reconnaissance Battalion 21 January 1941)
- 7th Battalion, Wiltshire Regiment (Duke of Edinburgh's) (from 12 September 1942)
- 4th Battalion, Devonshire Regiment (from 3 April 1944)

136th Infantry Brigade

- 9th Battalion, Devonshire Regiment (until 17 November 1940)
- 4th Battalion, Duke of Cornwall's Light Infantry
- 5th Battalion, Duke of Cornwall's Light Infantry (until 6 September 1942)
- 136th Infantry Brigade Anti-Tank Company (from 19 June 1940, joined 45th Reconnaissance Battalion 21 January 1941)
- 1st Battalion, Royal Irish Fusiliers' (from 17 November 1940, until 4 December 1941)
- 13th Battalion, Sherwood Foresters (from 12 December 1941, until 10 February 1942)
- 2nd Battalion, King's Shropshire Light Infantry (from 23 May 1942, until 19 August 1942)
- 7th Battalion, Queen's Own Royal West Kent Regiment (from 21 August 1942, until 4 January 1943)
- 12th Battalion, Hampshire Regiment (from 6 September 1942)
- 10th Battalion, East Surrey Regiment (from 5 January 1943)

Divisional Troops

- 45th Divisional artillery, Royal Artillery
  - 55th (Wessex) Field Regiment (until 7 June 1942)
  - 96th (Royal Devon Yeomanry) Field Regiment (until 21 June 1944)
  - 142nd (Royal Devon Yeomanry) Field Regiment (until 27 November 1941)
  - 171st Field Regiment (from 11 February 1942)
  - 69th (Duke of Connaught's Own) Anti-Tank Regiment (until 11 February 1942)
  - 90th Anti-Tank Regiment (from 22 February 1942, until 12 November 1943)
  - 88th Anti-Tank Regiment (from 21 January 1944)
- 45th Division engineers, Royal Engineers
  - 205th Field Company (until 15 December 1943)
  - 259th Field Company (until 22 December 1943, then from 25 April 1944)
  - 562nd Field Company (from 1 January 1940, until 8 December 1941)
  - 261st Field Park Company (until 6 January 1942)
  - Field Stores Section (from 3 January 1942, until 30 June 1944)
- 45th (West Country) Divisional Signals, Royal Corps of Signals
- 45th Divisional reconnaissance, Reconnaissance Corps
  - 45th Reconnaissance Battalion (formed from brigade anti-tank companies 22 January 1941; left 6 December 1941 and later joined 70th Infantry Division)
  - 45th Independent Reconnaissance Company (joined from 54th Battalion, Reconnaissance Corps 10 January 1942, became 45th Independent Reconnaissance Squadron 6 June 1942, (Note: In June 1942, the Reconnaissance Corps universally adopted cavalry nomenclature. As a result, all companies were redesignated as squadrons.) transferred to 15th (Scottish) Infantry Division 30 December 1943)

45th (Holding) Division / 45th Division (1944–1945)

134th Infantry Brigade

- 11th Battalion, South Staffordshire Regiment (until 14 November 1944)
- 7th Battalion, Royal Ulster Rifles
- 11th Battalion, Argyll and Sutherland Highlanders
- 2/6th Battalion, Lancashire Fusiliers
- 14th Battalion, Durham Light Infantry (from 15 November 1944)

135th Infantry Brigade

- 11th Battalion, Hampshire Regiment
- 14th Battalion, Durham Light Infantry (until 14 November 1944)
- 18th Battalion, Welch Regiment (until 19 September 1944)
- 6th Battalion, Northamptonshire Regiment
- 2/5th Battalion, Welch Regiment (from 19 September 1944)
- 11th Battalion, South Staffordshire Regiment (from 15 November 1944)

136th Infantry Brigade

- No battalions assigned

137th Infantry Brigade

- No battalions assigned

178th Infantry Brigade

- No battalions assigned

1 September onwards:

Divisional Troops

- 45th Divisional artillery, Royal Artillery
  - 175th Field Regiment
  - 176th Field Regiment
  - 8th Anti-Aircraft Reserve Regiment (until 3 January 1945)
  - 8th Reserve Regiment (from 4 January 1945 following the renaming of the 8th Anti-Aircraft Reserve Regiment)
- 161st Reconnaissance Regiment, Royal Armoured Corps (from 13 September 1944)

== See also ==
- List of British divisions in World War II
- British Army Order of Battle (September 1939)

== Notes ==
Footnotes

Citations
