= Frederick Morgan (British Army officer, born 1894) =

British Army general (1894–1967)

Lieutenant-General Sir Frederick Morgan KCB
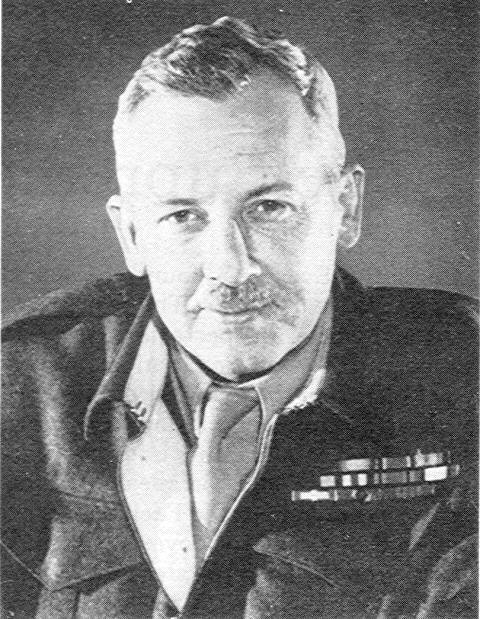
- Born: 5 February 1894; Paddock Wood, Kent, England
- Died: 19 March 1967 (aged 73); Northwood, Middlesex, England
- Military career
- Allegiance: United Kingdom
- Branch: British Army
- Service years: 1913–1946
- Rank: Lieutenant-General
- Nickname: "Freddie"
- Service number: 8223
- Units: Royal Field Artillery; Royal Artillery
- Commands: I Corps; 55th (West Lancashire) Infantry Division; Devon and Cornwall County Division; 1st Support Group
- Conflicts: First World War: Second Battle of Ypres; Battle of Fromelles; Battle of Vimy Ridge; Third Battle of Ypres; Hundred Days Offensive; Second World War: Battle of France; Operation Overlord; Siegfried Line Campaign; Battle of the Bulge; Western Allied invasion of Germany
- Awards: Knight Commander of the Order of the Bath; Mentioned in Despatches (2); Army Distinguished Service Medal (US); Legion of Merit (US); Legion of Honour (France); Croix de guerre (France)
- Other work: United Nations Relief and Rehabilitation Administration; Controller of Atomic Energy; Controller of Atomic Weapons

Lieutenant-General Sir Frederick Edgworth Morgan, KCB (5 February 1894 – 19 March 1967) was a senior officer of the British Army who served in both world wars. He is best known as the chief of staff to the Supreme Allied Commander (COSSAC), the original planner of Operation Overlord.

A graduate of the Royal Military Academy, Woolwich, Morgan was commissioned as a second lieutenant in the Royal Field Artillery in July 1913. During the First World War he served on the Western Front as an artillery subaltern and staff officer. Afterwards he served two long tours with the British Army in India.

Shortly before the outbreak of the Second World War in September 1939, Morgan was promoted to brigadier and assumed command of the 1st Support Group, part of the 1st Armoured Division, which he led during the Battle of France. After serving as Brigadier General Staff (BGS) with II Corps, he was promoted to major general in February 1941 and commanded both the Devon and Cornwall County Division and the 55th (West Lancashire) Infantry Division, before being promoted again in May 1942 to lieutenant general when he was given command of I Corps. His headquarters was then designated Force 125, and given the task of dealing with a German thrust through Spain to Gibraltar that never occurred. In March 1943 he was appointed Chief Of Staff to the Supreme Allied Commander (Designate), or COSSAC. As COSSAC he directed the planning for Operation Overlord. When American General Dwight D. Eisenhower became Supreme Allied Commander in early 1944, Major General Bedell Smith became chief of staff at Supreme Headquarters Allied Expeditionary Force (SHAEF), while Morgan became deputy chief of staff.

After the war, Morgan served as Chief of Operations for the United Nations Relief and Rehabilitation Administration (UNRRA) in Germany until his position in Germany was eliminated after he had alleged that UNRRA was infiltrated by Soviet agents seeking to stir up trouble among displaced persons. In 1951, Morgan became Controller of Atomic Energy, and was present for Operation Hurricane, the first British atomic weapons tests at the Montebello Islands in 1952. His position was abolished in 1954 with the creation of the United Kingdom Atomic Energy Authority but he remained as Controller of Nuclear Weapons until 1956.

== Early life ==
Frederick Morgan was born in Paddock Wood, Kent, on 5 February 1894, the eldest son among nine children of Frederick Beverley Morgan, a timber importer, and his wife Clare Elizabeth (née Horrocks). He was raised at Mascall's Manor, Paddock Wood. He commenced his education at Hurstleigh, a private school in Tunbridge Wells in 1902. At an early age it was decided that Frederick would become a British Army officer, and in 1907 he entered Clifton College, a school noted for its connections with the Royal Military Academy, Woolwich. At Clifton he played rugby and cricket, and served in the School Cadet Corps, which became the Officers' Training Corps (OTC) in 1908. As a cadet sergeant, he was one of many who lined the route to Buckingham Palace for the Coronation of George V of the United Kingdom in 1911. He eventually rose to the rank of second lieutenant. Morgan duly passed the entrance examination for Woolwich, which he entered in 1912.

Morgan was commissioned as a second lieutenant in the Royal Field Artillery on 17 July 1913, and joined the 41st Battery, 42nd Brigade, Royal Field Artillery at Aldershot. He volunteered for service in India, and in January 1914 departed on the British-India Steam Navigation Company troopship Rewa, joining the 84th Battery, 11th Brigade, Royal Field Artillery, which was stationed in Jabalpur.

== First World War ==
Following the outbreak of the First World War in August 1914, Morgan's battery departed for the Western Front in October 1914 as part of the 3rd (Lahore) Division. Morgan suffered a near-miss from a German 5.9-inch gun which blew him into the air and buried him in a shell hole, and he was evacuated to hospital in Boulogne with shell shock. He was granted a short sick leave in England only to be present when news reached his family that his brother had been killed in action. On returning to the front, Morgan became aide-de-camp (ADC) to Brigadier General Edward Spencer Hoare Nairne, the commander of the Lahore Divisional Artillery. The artillery remained on the Western Front when the bulk of the division departed for the Mesopotamian campaign. As it took longer to train artillery than infantry, the Lahore divisional artillery acted in turn as the artillery of the 2nd Canadian Division, 3rd Canadian Division, 4th Australian Division and finally the 4th Canadian Division until their own artillery was sufficiently trained to take over.

Morgan became a staff captain in February 1916, and was promoted to the temporary rank of captain in May 1916. The Lahore divisional artillery was broken up in mid-1917 and Morgan, promoted to captain on 18 July 1917, was posted to the 42nd (East Lancashire) Division as a staff captain. On 15 August 1917, he married Marjorie Cecile Whaite, the daughter of Colonel Thomas du Bédat Whaite of the Royal Army Medical Corps (RAMC). The couple had met on board the Rewa en route to India in 1914. Their marriage produced two daughters and a son.

During the Hundred Days Offensive which ultimately led to the armistice with Germany on 11 November 1918, he served as brigade major of the 42nd Divisional Artillery. During the war Morgan was twice mentioned in dispatches, on 15 May 1917, and again on 5 July 1919.

Of the end of the war and its aftermath Morgan later wrote:

So to England, home and a new start. No question of returning home in triumph as a conquering hero. There was nothing to show outwardly for those four years in the shadows, years of inner tension for which no relief could be found since it was impossible to describe the fullness of one's sensations to any who had not shared them. Unlike the later occasion when all men, women and even children smelt the whiff of hell, in 1919 there were few among those whose task had been to keep the home fires burning who could, even with the utmost endeavour, comprehend what had happened to those of us who came back, bent or broken, aged beyond our years.

So one had to screw the lid down on it all and strive to deaden the thought of the past by immersing oneself in present soil. This drug lay plentifully at hand, specially to the hands of those of us who must reshape the shattered army in this new world that had had more than enough of armies.

== Between the wars ==
In 1919, Morgan volunteered for a six-year tour of India, where he would ultimately spend much time during the interwar period, and joined the 118th Field Battery, 26th Field Brigade, at Deepcut, where it was forming and training for service in the subcontinent. Later that year the brigade moved to its new station at Jhansi. After three years Morgan was posted to Attock, where he commanded the Divisional Ammunition Column. In 1924 he accepted a temporary staff posting as Deputy Assistant Adjutant-General (DAAG) of Major-General Herbert Uniacke's 1st (Peshawar) Division at Murree. This was followed in 1925 by a year's secondment to the headquarters of Lieutenant-General Sir Claud Jacob's Northern Command, where Morgan helped plan and direct large-scale manoeuvres.

Morgan returned to England in 1926, and assumed command of the 22nd Heavy Battery. Equipped with a mixture of 9.2 inch guns, 6 inch guns, 12 pounders and 6 pounders, it was responsible for the coastal defences of Weymouth, Dorset. Still a captain, Morgan hoped that his next career move would be to attend the Staff College, Camberley, having narrowly passed the entrance examination. Instead, he was offered a place at the Staff College, Quetta, requiring a return trip to India. Morgan's classmates at Quetta from 1927 and 1928 included William Slim, John Crocker, Kenneth Anderson, David Cowan, George Alan Vasey and Tommy Burns, all of whom went on to achieve the rank of major general or higher. After graduation, Morgan was posted to the 70th Field Battery at Lucknow, and then was artillery staff officer at headquarters Western Command, under Brigadier Henry Karslake. When Karslake became major-general, Royal Artillery, at GHQ India in 1931, he brought Morgan to Delhi to serve with him as his General Staff Officer (Grade 2). Morgan, after receiving no promotion in rank for almost 15 years, was finally promoted to major on 22 June 1932 and brevet lieutenant colonel on 1 January 1934.

Returning to England in 1934, Morgan assumed command of the 4th Anti-Aircraft Battery, which was deployed to Malta during the diplomatic crisis that accompanied the Italian invasion of Abyssinia in 1935. He then returned to England and served in the War Office from 1936 to 1938, becoming on 22 December 1937 a deputy assistant military secretary at the War Office. Here he became increasingly disturbed at the lack of urgency that the British government displayed in the face of a war that Morgan and his fellow staff officers felt was inevitable and imminent. On 28 May 1938 he was promoted to substantive colonel (with seniority backdated to 1 January 1934) and became GSO1 of the 3rd Infantry Division, in which Brigadier Bernard Montgomery, later a field marshal, commanded the 8th Infantry Brigade.

== Second World War ==
=== Battle of France and service in the UK ===
I had won notable victories on paper and the map with the aid of greaseproof pencils and a typewriter. In the course of this very campaign, if one may dignify the disaster thus, I had seen French generals create imaginary "masses of manoeuvre" with strokes of the crayon and dispose of hostile concentrations, that unhappily were on the ground as well as on the map, with sweeps of the eraser. Who was I to criticise them, hero as I was of a hundred "Chinagraph wars" of make-believe?

— Frederick Morgan

On 8 August 1939, just a few weeks before the outbreak of the Second World War, Morgan was promoted to the temporary rank of brigadier and assumed command of the 1st Support Group of Major-General Roger Evans's 1st Armoured Division. When the 1st Support Group was shipped to France shortly after the German invasion of France in mid-May 1940 it had already been stripped of its two field artillery regiments and two infantry battalions. As a result, Morgan's command included only a force of Royal Engineers and a Territorial Army (TA) battalion of the Royal Welch Fusiliers, which was in the process of converting to an anti-aircraft/anti-tank regiment and armed only with anti-tank guns. His group was, therefore, in no position to fulfil its normal role supporting the division's armoured brigades and so was sent to reinforce the 51st (Highland) Infantry Division south of the River Somme. During a confused retreat most of the 1st Support Group was captured along with the 51st Division at Saint-Valery-en-Caux but the remainder, including Morgan, got away and were evacuated to England.

The 1st Armoured Division was subsequently reformed, and became a mobile reserve in south eastern England. It was tasked with counter-attacking an invading German army, and Morgan's 1st Support Group was given two Canadian infantry battalions for this purpose. On 4 November 1940 Morgan was appointed Brigadier General Staff (BGS) at II Corps, based in Norfolk. Morgan was not there long, however, as on 28 February 1941 he was promoted to the acting rank of major-general and succeeded Major-General Charles Allfrey in command of the Devon and Cornwall County Division, a static formation created for coastal defence, lacking artillery, engineers and divisional troops. The division was serving in South West England in Devon and Cornwall under Lieutenant-General Harold Franklyn's VIII Corps. He was with the division for eight months before handing over to Major-General Godwin Michelmore on 30 October and succeeding Major-General William Morgan in command of the 55th (West Lancashire) Infantry Division, a first-line TA formation serving in Gloucestershire in Southern Command. The division, which moved to North Yorkshire under Northern Command in mid-December, was placed on the Lower Establishment the following month, losing much of its artillery, engineers and divisional troops and receiving a low priority for modern equipment. On 28 February, a year after being made an acting major-general, Morgan's rank of major-general was made temporary.

He was not to remain with the division for long, however, as on 14 May Morgan handed over command of the 55th Division to Major-General Hugh Hibbert and was promoted to the acting rank of lieutenant general and took command of I Corps District from Lieutenant-General Henry Willcox, which had responsibility for the defence of Lincolnshire and the East Riding of Yorkshire. In October of that year his headquarters became a mobile formation, was redesignated I Corps and placed under his American superior, Lieutenant General Dwight D. Eisenhower. On 12 November Morgan's permanent rank was advanced from colonel to major-general (with seniority backdating to 13 November 1941). Morgan's I Corps headquarters was later designated Force 125 and was given command of Walter Clutterbuck's 1st and John Hawkesworth's 4th Divisions, and the task of dealing with a German thrust through Spain to Gibraltar.

This operation proved unnecessary, and Morgan's two divisions were sent to North Africa, while he was directed to plan the invasion of Sardinia. In time this was abandoned in favour of the Allied invasion of Sicily (Operation Husky), which took place in July 1943. I Corps headquarters remained in the United Kingdom the whole time, located at 1 Cumberland near Marble Arch, with the headquarters mess in the Lyons Marble Arch Corner House. However, it gained considerable experience in operational planning. Morgan's rank of lieutenant-general was made temporary on 14 May 1943, and he was appointed a Companion of the Order of the Bath (CB) on 2 June.

=== COSSAC ===
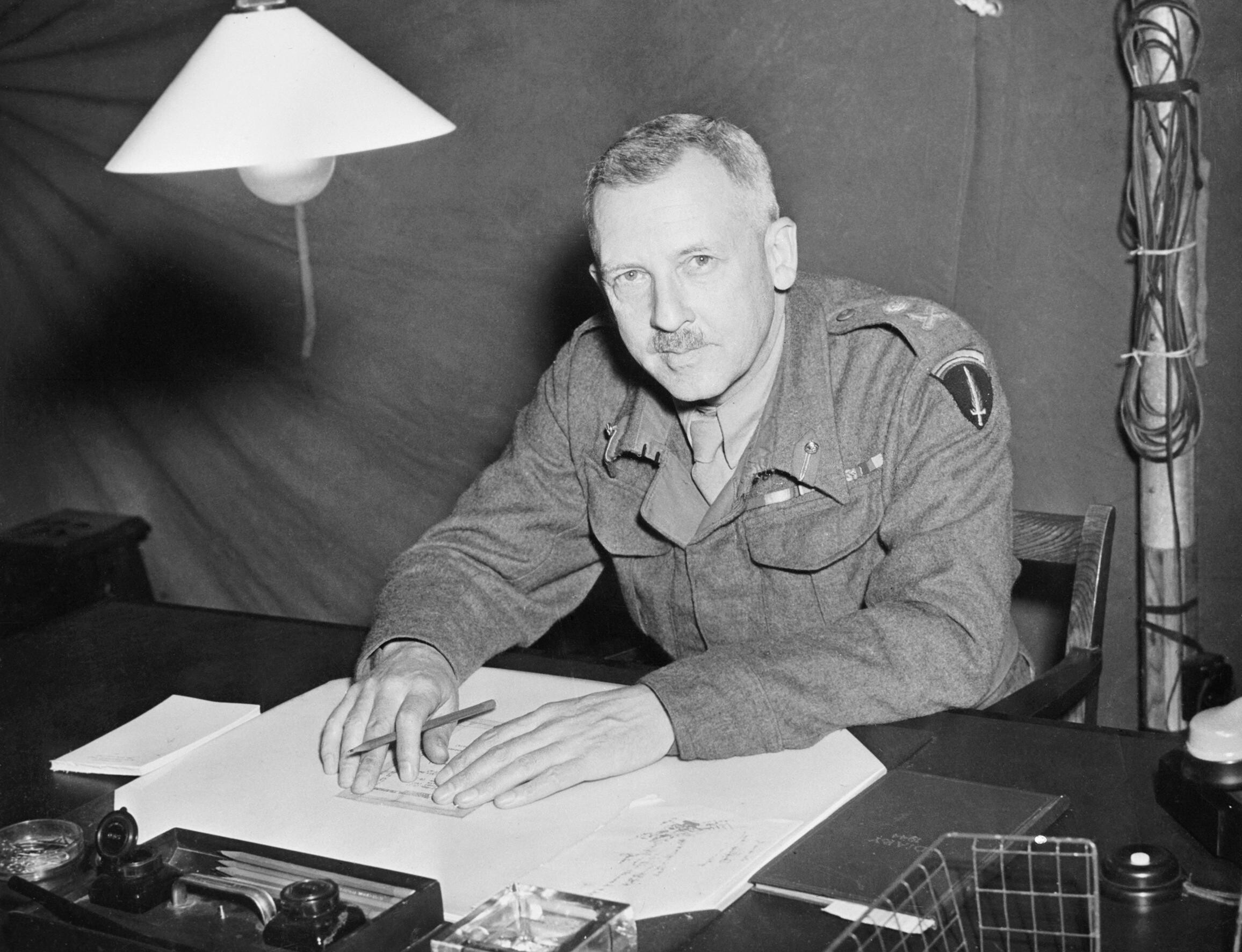
Lieutenant-General F. E. Morgan, Chief of Staff to the Supreme Allied Commander (COSSAC), holding a press conference at headquarters.

At the Casablanca Conference in January 1943, the Combined Chiefs of Staff agreed to establish a staff to plan operations in north west Europe in 1944. It was envisaged that the Supreme Allied Commander would be British, and the usual practice was for the commander and the chief of staff to be of the same nationality, so it was decided to appoint a British officer for the role of chief of staff to the Supreme Allied Commander (Designate) (COSSAC), with an American deputy. In March 1943 Morgan became COSSAC. Brigadier General Ray Barker became his American deputy. Initially, Morgan's staff consisted of an aide, two batmen and a driver with a car purloined from I Corps headquarters. Morgan established his headquarters in Norfolk House at 31 St James's Square. However, by October 1943, it was clearly too small for COSSAC needs, which called for accommodation for a staff of 320 officers and 600 other ranks. In November and December part of the staff moved to the South Rotunda, a bombproof structure that had originally been fitted up as an anti-invasion base, which was connected to the various ministries by the Whitehall Tunnel. Other staff were accommodated at 80 Pall Mall.

COSSAC was charged with planning three operations: Operation Cockade, a deception operation to keep German forces pinned to the coast; Operation Rankin, a plan for measures to be taken in the case of a sudden German collapse; and Operation Overlord, a plan for a full-scale assault on north western Europe. Morgan and his staff worked on the Overlord plan throughout June and the first half of July 1943. He presented it to the Chiefs of Staff Committee on 15 July. The plan set forth in detail the conditions under which the assault could be made, the area where a landing would be feasible, and the means by which a lodgement on the continent would be developed.

On 28 July, a group of the COSSAC staff, headed by Barker, travelled to Washington D.C. to present the Overlord plan to the U.S. Joint Chiefs of Staff, and to confer with the U.S. War Department about the troop basis for the operation and issues related to its civil affairs and logistics aspects. Missions were also exchanged with General Dwight D. Eisenhower's Allied Force Headquarters (AFHQ) in Algiers to coordinate the plans of offensive action in the Mediterranean and north western Europe in 1944. In October and November, Morgan went to Washington, to discuss the operation with the Combined Chiefs of Staff, accompanied only by Major-General Nevil Brownjohn and an aide. Morgan met with General George Marshall, the Chief of Staff of the United States Army, who instructed him to proceed with planning on the basis that Marshall would be the Supreme Allied Commander and Morgan his chief of staff. Morgan met with President Franklin D. Roosevelt at the White House. Roosevelt turned down Morgan's request for the services of Anthony Joseph Drexel Biddle, Jr. to assist with civil affairs, and also cast doubt on whether Marshall could be spared to become Supreme Allied Commander. While in the United States Morgan visited the Gettysburg Battlefield and the training camps at Camp Carrabelle, Fort Benning, Camp Mackall and Fort Bragg.

The Combined Chiefs of Staff authorised Morgan to issue orders in the name of the Supreme Allied Commander to the Commanders in Chief of the Air, Naval and Land Forces, even though they outranked him. In December 1943, when General Sir Bernard Montgomery, who had just arrived in England after commanding the British Eighth Army on the Italian Front, was appointed C-in-C Land Forces for the invasion, he declared that Morgan's original plans were impracticable; they had originally been limited by the availability of landing craft, but Montgomery insisted it would require more men attacking over a wider front. Ultimately, more landing craft were obtained and the invasion was scaled up to Montgomery's satisfaction, at the cost of a month's delay and a reduction in the Southern France operation. However, all the key features of Morgan's plan remained; the choice of Normandy as the assault area, the use of Mulberry harbours, the deployment of American forces on the right and British on the left, the use of airborne troops to cover the flanks, and some form of diversionary operation in Southern France.

=== SHAEF ===
When Eisenhower was appointed Supreme Allied Commander in January 1944 the COSSAC team was absorbed into SHAEF. Eisenhower brought his chief of staff for AFHQ, Major General Walter Bedell Smith, and moved the headquarters to Bushy Park. Morgan was offered command of XIII Corps in Italy but declined in favour of becoming one of Smith's three deputies. His responsibilities covered Intelligence and Operations. Morgan coordinated the work of various SHAEF divisions and deputised for Bedell Smith when he was absent.

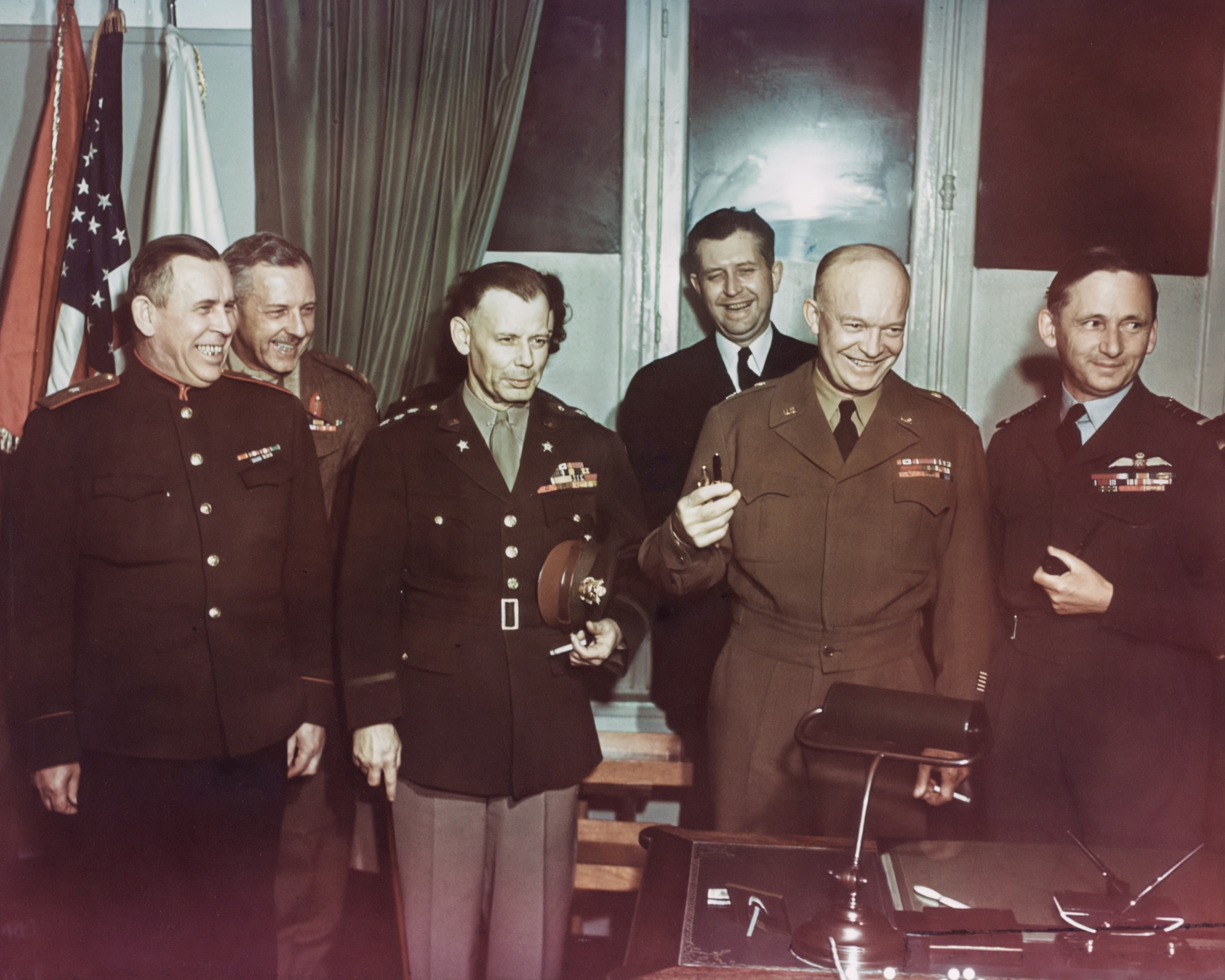
Senior Allied officers at SHAEF headquarters in Reims shortly after the German surrender, 1945. Present are (left to right): Major General Ivan Susloparov, Lieutenant General Frederick Morgan, Lieutenant General Walter Bedell Smith, Captain Kay Summersby (obscured), Captain Harry C. Butcher, General of the Army Dwight D. Eisenhower, Air Chief Marshal Arthur Tedder.

Morgan was also called upon on occasion to deal with Montgomery, with whom his professional relationship as deputy chief of staff was similar to that before the war when Montgomery was a brigade commander. On one occasion Morgan was summoned to Smith's office to find him white with rage at a telephone receiver. "That's your bloody marshal on the other end of that," Smith explained. "I can't talk to him any more. Now you go on." "As the campaign progressed," Morgan later wrote, "it became more difficult for us British at SHAEF to provide explanation, as we were continually called upon to do, for the attitude and behaviour of the British authorities as exemplified by their chosen representative in the field." Senior British officers at SHAEF, notably Morgan, Kenneth Strong and Jock Whiteley remained loyal to Eisenhower. This cast a pall over their careers after the war, when Montgomery became Chief of the Imperial General Staff (CIGS).

After the war Smith described Morgan as his British alter ego, "a man I wouldn't willingly have dispensed with". Morgan served in this role until SHAEF was dissolved in June 1945. He was appointed Knight Commander of the Order of the Bath (KCB) in August 1944 "in recognition of distinguished services in connection with the invasion of Normandy". The United States government awarded him the Legion of Merit in April 1945, and the Army Distinguished Service Medal in 1948 for his services.

== Post-war career ==
=== UNRRA ===
In September 1945 Morgan became the Chief of Operations for the United Nations Relief and Rehabilitation Administration (UNRRA) in Germany. He applied his energy and planning skills to the problem of providing relief to millions of refugees and displaced persons in Europe in the wake of the war. However, he became disillusioned with UNRRA believing it was being misused by sinister organisations.

In his position Morgan was responsible for administering Jewish displaced persons camps in Germany. A highly publicised incident occurred on 29 March 1946 when German policemen entered a Jewish DP camp in Stuttgart without notifying UNRRA or military authorities; when the DPs angrily shouted at the police, a German officer shot dead one of them, a Jewish concentration camp survivor. A local UNRRA district director was outraged and wanted to "admonish" the Germans; however, Morgan was angered by this admonishment and overruled his subordinate, forcing the district director to resign. Morgan's superior, the UNRRA director general Fiorello La Guardia, after hearing of the incident, denounced the Stuttgart shooting as "brutal, cruel, cowardly", overruled Morgan and pushed for a ban on German police freely entering DP camps which was duly implemented by military authorities.

Morgan had pushed for repatriating the displaced persons back to their devastated home countries. However, as an anti-Communist, he was outspokenly against repatriation of former collaborationists with the Nazis who had fought against the Soviets.

In January 1946 Morgan created an uproar by claiming at a press conference that there was a "secret Jewish organisation" that was attempting to facilitate an "exodus" of Jewish people from Europe to Palestine. Morgan stated that he had witnessed an "exodus of Jews from Poland on Russian trains on a regular route from Lodz to Berlin. All of them were well dressed, well fed, healthy and had pockets bulging with money. All of them told the same monotonous story of threats, pogroms, and atrocities in Poland as a reason for their leaving". Morgan claimed that by the end of 1946 there would be 300,000 to 500,000 Jews in Germany who would form "the seeds of World War III". One reporter quoted Morgan as remarking that "the Jews seem to have organised a plan enabling them to become a world power- a weak force numerically, but one which will have a generating power for getting what they want".

Morgan's statements caused a furore in the press, which portrayed them as anti-Semitic and distasteful. Chaim Weizmann, leader of the World Zionist Organization, called Morgan's statement "palpably anti-Semitic". The Board of Deputies of British Jews issued a statement that said that "General Morgan’s references to a “Jewish plot” to become a “world force” coming on top of the Nuremberg evidence of the extermination of nearly 6,000,000 Jews by the Nazis is not only a grotesque bogey, but highly uncharitable and unworthy when it comes from the head of an organization whose purpose it is to bring comfort to suffering victims of Nazi barbarity."

UNRRA expected that Morgan would offer his resignation but he did not do so. Morgan's friends vouched for him. Time magazine reported at the time that: "Observers here ... are positive of [Morgan's] sincerity, and know he had no intention of feeding the fires of anti-Semitic propaganda." A correspondent asserted that Morgan made "casual observations based on what he saw ... but the controversial remarks were taken out of the context and put together by correspondents." When Morgan's first attempt to clarify his position "off the record" failed and he was ousted, Morgan flew to Washington to meet with UNRRA Director General, Herbert H. Lehman, and convinced Lehman to reinstate him.

Six months later Morgan was again in the news, this time alleging that UNRRA organisations were being used as a cover by Soviet agents to stir up trouble among displaced persons. This time Morgan's position in Germany was eliminated by the new UNRRA Director General Fiorello La Guardia.

In his memoirs Morgan stood by his allegations claiming they were based on military intelligence. Morgan wrote that he had been able to uncover how the UNRRA was being manipulated to promote a "Zionist campaign of aggression" with Russian connivance.

According to the US Holocaust Memorial Museum, "Morgan’s statement also reflected linkages between Jews and “Bolshevism,” while at the same time gesturing toward future Cold War politics. Indeed, the Nazi regime frequently equated Jewish politics with a communist threat, building on antisemitic stereotypes of the Jews as part of a conspiracy to gain world domination."

=== Atomic Energy ===
Morgan was appointed Colonel Commandant of the Royal Artillery from 24 June 1948 until 24 June 1958 In 1951, he succeeded Lord Portal as Controller of Atomic Energy. The position had been created in January 1946 as "Controller of Production, Atomic Energy" when the Ministry of Supply had assumed responsibility for nuclear weapons. The job, the title of which was changed to "Controller Atomic Energy" in 1950, had no written terms of reference, but carried broad responsibility for the coordination of all aspects of nuclear weapons production. Although located within the Ministry of Supply, the controller had direct access to the Prime Minister; Portal rarely exercised this, however. It was widely believed that Morgan, who was, in the words of Margaret Gowing, "amiable but not adequate to the task", had been appointed by mistake, having been confused with his namesake, General Sir William Morgan. The latter had greatly impressed Prime Minister Clement Attlee as Army member of the Joint Staff Mission to the United States from 1947 to 1950. Morgan, therefore, relied heavily on his key subordinates, Sir John Cockcroft, William Penney, and Christopher Hinton.

In his role as Controller of Atomic Energy, Morgan was present for Operation Hurricane, the first British atomic weapons tests at the Montebello Islands in October 1952. His position was gradually reduced to a figurehead, with his authority largely supplanted by the Atomic Energy Board, which was chaired by Lord Cherwell, and was abolished in 1954 with the creation of the United Kingdom Atomic Energy Authority. Morgan then became Controller of Nuclear Weapons. Nonetheless, he was still an important figure in the push for higher-yield weapons. He pressed for the testing of the Green Bamboo boosted fission weapon during Operation Mosaic. This resulted in Mosaic becoming a two-test series, although Green Bamboo could not be made available in time. A Green Bamboo assembly was subsequently taken to Christmas Island for Operation Grapple, but was deleted from the test series to save money. Morgan was also instrumental in putting the case for the development of the H-bomb on operational grounds.

Morgan retired in 1956, although he remained Colonel Commandant of the Royal Artillery until 1958. He published his memoirs, entitled Peace and War: A Soldier's Life in 1961. He died at Mount Vernon Hospital on 19 March 1967, at the age of 73.

== Notes ==
Military offices
Preceded by Charles Allfrey	GOC Devon and Cornwall County Division; February–October 1941	Succeeded by Godwin Michelmore
Preceded by William Morgan	GOC 55th (West Lancashire) Infantry Division; 1941–1942	Succeeded by Hugh Hibbert
Preceded by Henry Willcox	GOC I Corps; 1942–1943	Succeeded by Gerard Bucknall
Government offices
Preceded by Lord Portal	Controller Atomic Energy; 1951–1954	Abolished
