= 77th Infantry Division (United Kingdom) =

77th Infantry Division 77th Infantry (Reserve) Division 77th (Holding) Division
- The divisional insignia
- Active: 1 December 1941 –1 September 1944
- Country: United Kingdom
- Branch: British Army
- Type: Infantry
- Role: Home defence, and training.

The 77th Infantry Division of the British Army was formed in 1941, during the Second World War, from the re-organisation of the Devon and Cornwall County Division. During its existence the division changed roles several times. The division's initial role was coastal defence, protecting Devon. On 20 December 1942, it was converted into a training formation, known as a reserve division. In this capacity, the division provided final tactical and field training for the infantry that had already passed their initial training. After five additional weeks of training, the soldiers would be posted to fighting formations overseas. The division also had a tank brigade attached to provide training in armoured warfare.

On 1 December 1943, the division took on a new role and was again renamed. Now the 77th (Holding) Division, it was responsible for retraining the soldiers who had been on medical leave, former prisoners of war, repatriates, and anyone who did not meet the army's physical standards. Once the men were brought up to the standard, they were allocated to formations fighting overseas. Notably, the formation was used as a source of reinforcements for the 21st Army Group, which fought in Normandy. After all available British Army troops left the United Kingdom for France, the division was disbanded. It was subsequently re-formed as a deception unit, to give Germany the impression that the British Army had more divisions than it actually did. The 77th Division was notionally held in reserve within the United Kingdom for the remainder of the war, but was otherwise unused for deception measures.

== Background ==
The divisional badge of the Devon and Cornwall County Division

In 1940, following the Second World War's Battle of France, the United Kingdom was under threat of invasion from Germany. The Battle of Britain, fought between July and October, reduced this threat. As the year progressed, the size of the British Army increased dramatically as 140 new infantry battalions were raised. During October, with the possibility of a German invasion during 1941, these new battalions were formed into independent infantry brigades that were then assigned to newly created county divisions.

The county divisions, including the Devon and Cornwall County Division, were around 10,000 men strong and assigned to defend the coastlines of threatened sections of the country, including the manning of coastal artillery. These divisions were largely static and lacked divisional assets such as artillery, engineers, and reconnaissance forces. Using the recruits in this manner allowed the regular infantry divisions to be freed up from such duties, and form an all-important reserve that could be used to counterattack possible German landings.

On 22 June 1941, Germany launched a massive attack upon the Soviet Union; this attack all but removed the threat of a German invasion of the United Kingdom. However, the British still had to consider the threat of a German invasion due to the possibility that the Soviet Union could collapse under the German onslaught and the ease in which Germany could transfer troops back to the west. In late 1941, the arrival of autumn and winter weather meant that the threat of invasion subsided. This, coupled with the production of new equipment for the British Army, allowed the War Office to take steps to better balance the army. Prior to this point, the British Army had considerably increased the infantry force following the large intake of recruits. The efforts by the War Office were intended to address this, by converting many of the newly raised infantry battalions to other roles. In particular, infantry units were converted into artillery or armour units. The historian F.W. Perry wrote there was considerable pressure "to increase the armoured component [of the army] and build up raiding and special forces". These pressures and the re-balancing of the military, resulted in seven of the nine county divisions being disbanded and only two being reformed as infantry divisions.

== History ==
=== Home defence ===
During the war, the divisions of the British Army were classified as either higher or lower establishment formations. The former were intended for deployment overseas and combat, whereas the latter were strictly for home defence in a static role. On 1 December 1941, the Devon and Cornwall County Division was abolished and reformed as the 77th Infantry Division, a lower establishment division. The division, like its predecessor, comprised the 203rd, the 209th, and the 211th Infantry Brigades. That day, the division was assigned artillery, engineers, and signallers. An anti-tank regiment and reconnaissance troops joined the following month. In 1944, the war-establishment's on-paper strength of an infantry division was 17,298 men. Major-General Godwin Michelmore, who had commanded the Devon and Cornwall County Division since 30 October, retained command of the division. The 77th was assigned to the VIII Corps, and remained based in the Devon area. According to the Imperial War Museum, the divisional insignia references "Arthur's sword Excalibur, acknowledging the [division's] connections with the West Country" and its predecessor division. After the division became a training formation, the insignia was only worn by the permanent division members.

=== Training formation ===
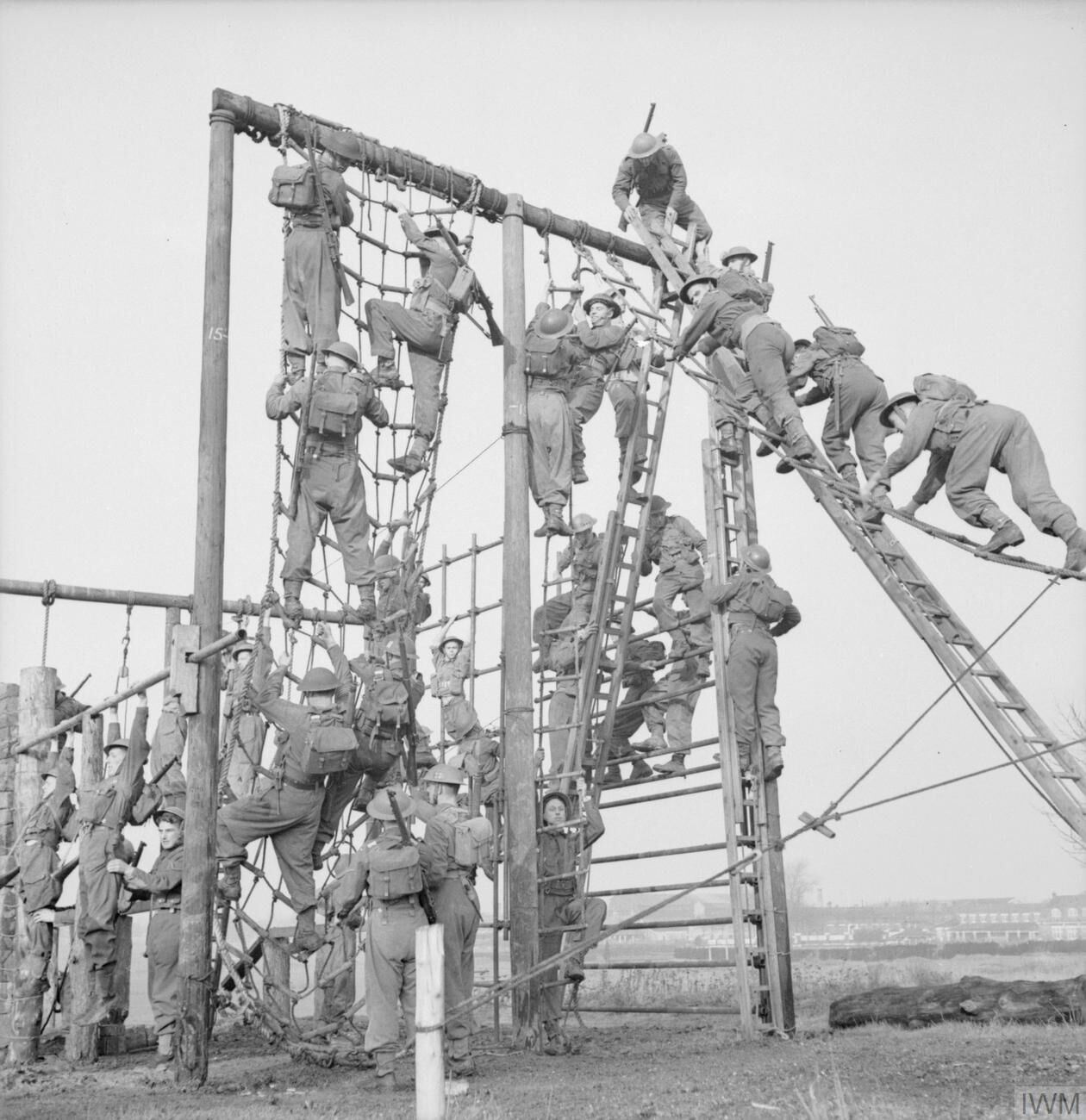
Infantry training, January 1943.

In December 1942, the British Army started an overhaul of how it would train new recruits. On 20 December 1942, the division was renamed the 77th Infantry (Reserve) Division, becoming a training formation in the process. It was one of three lower establishment formations that were converted. (Note: The other two divisions were the 48th and the 76th.) These three divisions were supplemented by a fourth training formation, the 80th Infantry (Reserve) Division, which was raised on 1 January 1943. The 77th Infantry (Reserve) Division was assigned to Northern Command. New recruits to the army would initially be assigned to the General Service Corps, and undertake six weeks training at a Primary Training Centre and take aptitude and intelligence tests. From there, a recruit would be posted to a Corps Training Centre that specialised in an arm of the service they were joining. For those who would be joining the infantry, corps training involved a further sixteen week course. For more specialised roles such as signallers, it could be up to thirty weeks. Having completed their basic and job-specific training, soldiers would then be dispatched to a reserve division for additional training. At the division, they were given five weeks of additional training at the section, platoon and company level, before undertaking a final three-day exercise. Troops would then be ready to be sent overseas to join other formations. Training was handled in this manner to relieve the higher establishment divisions from being milked for replacements for other units and to allow them to intensively train without the interruption of having to handle new recruits. For example, the 12th Battalion, Devonshire Regiment, part of the 203rd Infantry Brigade, provided the additional training to the regiment's new recruits before assigning them to other battalions within the regiment.

As part of the restructuring, the 211th Infantry Brigade was transferred to the 80th Infantry (Reserve) Division. It was replaced by the 11th Army Tank Brigade, in order to provide training facilities for the Royal Armoured Corps and retain reinforcements until they were ready to be deployed. On 1 December 1943, the division was again re-organised, and became the 77th (Holding) Division. As part of this restructuring, the 11th Army Tank Brigade was withdrawn. Lieutenant-Colonel H.F. Joslen wrote that the division's role was now "for sorting, retraining and holding personnel temporarily – due to disbandments, medical and other causes." For example, as part of the change from a reserve to a holding division, the 14th Battalion, Durham Light Infantry, part of the 209th Infantry Brigade, was converted from a regular infantry unit into a rehabilitation centre. Ex-prisoners of war, repatriates, troops who were suffering from morale issues or did not meet the army's physical standards were sent to the battalion where they underwent medical, physical, and military tests. These tests were designed to establish what medical category the soldiers should be assigned, and what military job or capability would best suit them. Likewise, soldiers returning from long periods of overseas service were sent to the 11th Battalion, York and Lancaster Regiment, part of the 203rd Infantry Brigade, for retraining.

On 30 June 1944, the 77th Holding and the other three training divisions had a combined total of 22,355 men. Of these, only 1,100 were immediately available as replacements for the 21st Army Group, then fighting in Normandy. (Note: The war establishment—the paper strength—of a higher establishment infantry division in 1944 was 18,347 men.) The remaining 21,255 men were considered ineligible for service abroad due to a variety of reasons, ranging from medical, not being considered fully fit, or not yet fully trained. Over the following six months, up to 75 per cent of these men would be deployed to reinforce the 21st Army Group, following the completion of their training and/or having come up to the required fitness levels. Historian Stephen Hart comments that, by September, the 21st Army Group "had bled Home Forces dry of draftable riflemen" due to the losses suffered during the Battle of Normandy, leaving the army in Britain (with the exception of the 52nd (Lowland) Infantry Division) with just "young lads, old men, and the unfit". On 1 September 1944, the division was disbanded. The 45th (Holding) Division was then formed (the 45th Infantry Division having been disbanded on 15 August) by Michelmore and his headquarter staff. Michelmore assumed command, and the 45th (Holding) Division took over the role of the 77th Division. Roger Hesketh states the reason behind this renumbering was due to the 45th Division being a "well-known territorial [formation from] before the war whose [number was] familiar to the public and [was] therefore of recruiting value".

=== Deception ===
During 1944, the British Army faced a manpower crisis. The army did not have enough men to replace the losses to front line infantry. While efforts were made to address this (such as transferring men from the Royal Artillery and Royal Air Force to be retrained as infantry), the War Office began disbanding divisions to downsize the army so as to transfer men to other units to help keep those as close to full strength as possible. The 77th (Holding) Division was one of several lower establishment divisions, within the United Kingdom, chosen to be disbanded.

The R Force, a British deception unit, seized upon this opportunity to retain the division as a phantom unit to inflate the army's order of battle. A cover story was established to explain the change in the division's status. It was claimed that, with the war nearing an end, several Territorial Army divisions would revert to their peacetime recruiting role and release their equipment and resources to other units. For the 77th, this equipment would be notionally transferred from the 45th Division. With the transfer of equipment, the 77th Division was notionally raised to the higher establishment. The notional division was held in reserve, within the United Kingdom, pending a future use elsewhere. Thaddeus Holt's The Deceivers: Allied Military Deception in the Second World War states after the division was retained for deception purposes, it was "apparently never used."

== Order of battle ==
77th Infantry Division (December 1941 – December 1942)

203rd Infantry Brigade

Main article: 203rd Infantry Brigade
- 12th Battalion, Devonshire Regiment (until September 1942)
- 10th Battalion, Loyal Regiment (North Lancashire) (until May 1942)
- 9th Battalion, Essex Regiment (until September 1942)
- 11th Battalion, Hampshire Regiment (September 1942)
- 2nd Battalion, Loyal Regiment (North Lancashire) (May 1942, until September 1942)
- 2nd Battalion, East Surrey Regiment (from September 1942)
- 10th Battalion, Royal Sussex Regiment (from September 1942)

209th Infantry Brigade

Main article: 209th Infantry Brigade
- 8th Battalion, Buffs (Royal East Kent Regiment) (until September 1942)
- 9th Battalion, Buffs (Royal East Kent Regiment)
- 10th Battalion, Buffs (Royal East Kent Regiment)
- 11th Battalion, Hampshire Regiment (from September 1942)
- 14th Battalion, Durham Light Infantry (from September 1942)

211th Infantry Brigade

Main article: 211th Infantry Brigade
- 10th Battalion, East Surrey Regiment
- 11th Battalion, Devonshire Regiment (until September 1942)
- 14th Battalion, Royal Warwickshire Regiment (until October 1942)
- 13th Battalion, Queen's Royal Regiment (from September 1942)
- 2/6th Battalion, Lancashire Fusiliers (from October 1942)

Divisional Troops

- 77th Infantry divisional artillery, Royal Artillery
  - 23rd Field Regiment
  - 175th Field Regiment (from July 1942; disbanded February 1943)
  - 87th (Devon) Anti-tank Regiment (from January 1942, until October 1942)
- 77th Infantry divisional engineers, Royal Engineers
  - 100 (Monmouthshire) Field Company
  - 101 (Monmouthshire) Field Company
  - Divisional Field Stores Section
- 77th Infantry Divisional Signals, Royal Corps of Signals
- 77th Independent Company, Reconnaissance Corps (joined from 15th Battalion, Reconnaissance Corps 1 January 1942; became 77th Independent Reconnaissance Squadron 6 June 1942)

77th Infantry (Reserve) Division (December 1942 – June 1944)

203rd Infantry Brigade

- 2nd Battalion, East Surrey Regiment (until January 1943)
- 10th Battalion, Royal Sussex Regiment (until October 1943)
- 15th Battalion, Queen's Royal Regiment (September 1943, until October 1943)
- 8th Battalion, Devonshire Regiment (from January 1943, until November 1943)
- 11th Battalion, South Staffordshire Regiment (from October 1943)
- 11th Battalion, York and Lancaster Regiment (from November 1943)
- 9th Battalion, Seaforth Highlanders (from November 1943)
- 7th Battalion, Royal Ulster Rifles (from November 1943)

209th Infantry Brigade

- 9th Battalion, Buffs (Royal East Kent Regiment) (until October 1943)
- 10th Battalion, Buffs (Royal East Kent Regiment) (until October 1943)
- 11th Battalion, Hampshire Regiment
- 14th Battalion, Durham Light Infantry
- 18th Battalion, Welch Regiment (from November 1943)
- 6th Battalion, Northamptonshire Regiment (from November 1943)

211th Infantry Brigade (until January 1943)

- 10th Battalion, East Surrey Regiment
- 13th Battalion, Queen's Royal Regiment
- 2/6th Battalion, Lancashire Fusiliers

11th Army Tank Brigade (1943 only)

Main article: 11th Army Tank Brigade
- 107th Regiment Royal Armoured Corps
- 110th Regiment Royal Armoured Corps
- 111th Regiment Royal Armoured Corps

Divisional Troops

- 77th Infantry (Reserve) divisional artillery, Royal Artillery
  - 175th Field Regiment (reformed and rejoined from August 1943)
  - 176th Field Regiment (from December 1942)
- 77th Infantry (Reserve) divisional engineers, Royal Engineers
  - 556th Field Company (from January 1943, until October 1943)
  - Divisional Field Stores Section
- 77th Infantry (Reserve) Divisional Signals, Royal Corps of Signals
- 77th Independent Squadron, Reconnaissance Corps (transferred to 80th (Reserve) Division 3 January 1943)
- 10th Battalion, King's Royal Rifle Corps (Motor Battalion. From January 1943, until November 1943)

77th (Holding) Division (June – September 1944)

203rd Infantry Brigade

- 11th Battalion, South Staffordshire Regiment
- 11th Battalion, York and Lancaster Regiment (until July 1944)
- 9th Battalion, Seaforth Highlanders (until July 1944)
- 7th Battalion, Royal Ulster Rifles
- 11th Battalion, Argyll and Sutherland Highlanders (from July 1944)
- 2/6th Battalion, Lancashire Fusiliers (from July 1944)

209th Infantry Brigade

- 11th Battalion, Hampshire Regiment
- 14th Battalion, Durham Light Infantry
- 18th Battalion, Welch Regiment
- 6th Battalion, Northamptonshire Regiment

Divisional Troops

- 77th (Holding) divisional artillery, Royal Artillery
  - 175th Field Regiment
  - 176th Field Regiment
- 77th (Holding) divisional engineers, Royal Engineers
  - Divisional Field Stores Section
- 77th Divisional Signals, Royal Corps of Signals
