= 203rd Infantry Brigade (United Kingdom) =

- Active: 11 October 1940-1 September 1944
- Country: United Kingdom
- Branch: British Army
- Type: Infantry Brigade
- Role: Home Defence
- Part of: Devon and Cornwall County Division; 77th Division

203rd Infantry Brigade was a Home Defence formation of the British Army during the Second World War.

== Origin ==
The brigade was formed as 203rd Independent Infantry Brigade (Home) for service in the United Kingdom on 11 October 1940 by No 3 Infantry Training Group in the South West Area (later Devon and Cornwall County Division) of Southern Command. It consisted of five recently formed infantry battalions. Home brigades had a purely static defence role.

== Service ==
203rd Independent Infantry Brigade (Home) served in SW Area/Devon and Cornwall County Division until 1 December 1942, when the County Division was renamed 77th Infantry Division and the brigade was redesignated 203rd Infantry Brigade. On 1 September 1944, 77th Division was disbanded and its personnel reformed as 45th (Holding) Division. At the same time 203rd Brigade was redesignated 134th Infantry Brigade (replacing a disbanded formation with the same number). All of these formations remained in the United Kingdom throughout the war.

== Order of Battle ==
203rd Brigade was composed as follows:

As part of the Devon and Cornwall County Division:

- 11th Battalion, West Yorkshire Regiment (formed in July 1940 at York; to 214 Bde 14 July 1941)
- 7th Battalion, East Yorkshire Regiment (formed in July 1940, at Beverley)
- 8th Battalion, Bedfordshire and Hertfordshire Regiment (formed in July 1940 at Bedford)
- 6th Battalion, Duke of Cornwall's Light Infantry (formed in May 1940 at Truro as 50th Holding Battalion, DCLI; became 6th Bn on 9 October 1940)
- 8th Battalion, Duke of Wellington's Regiment (formed in Summer 1940 at Otley; converted into 145th Regiment Royal Armoured Corps, on 1 November 1941)

Between 30 June and 19 July 1941, the 7th East Yorks, 6th DCLI and 8th Beds & Herts were all transferred to reconstitute 73rd Independent Bde, which took over all the static units in Cornwall. This left 203rd Bde with only the 8th Duke of Wellington's under command, but the following units were added to it over time:

- 12th Battalion, Devonshire Regiment (from 226th Brigade 19 July 1941; left 8 September 1942)
- 9th Battalion, Buffs (Royal East Kent Regiment) (from 209th Bde 16 August 1941; returned to 209th Bde 14 November 1941)

As part of 77th Division:

- 9th Battalion, Essex Regiment (from 226th Bde 23 November 1941; to 219th Bde 17 September 1942)
- 10th Battalion, Loyal Regiment (North Lancashire) (from 210th Bde 25 November 1941; on 28 May 1942 this battalion was used to reconstitute the Regular 2nd Bn (captured at the Fall of Hong Kong 25 December 1941); 2nd Bn went to 199th Bde on 15 September 1942)
- 11th Battalion, Hampshire Regiment (from 214th Bde 10 September 1942; to 209th Bde 23 September 1942)
- 2nd Battalion, East Surrey Regiment (from 219th Bde 15 September 1942; to 134th Bde 3 January 1943)
- 10th Battalion, Royal Sussex Regiment (from 219th Bde 18 September 1942; left 24 October 1943 and disbanded 4 December at Durham)
- 15th Battalion, Queen's Royal Regiment (West Surrey) (from 219th Bde 28 September 1942; left 24 October 1943 and disbanded 4 December at Durham)
- 8th Battalion, Devonshire Regiment (from 134th Bde 4 January 1943; to 211th Bde 2 November 1943)
- 11th Battalion, South Staffordshire Regiment (from 199 Bde 16 October 1943; to 209 Bde 14 November 1943)
- 11th Battalion, York and Lancaster Regiment (from 213th Bde 17 November 1943; to 143rd Bde 24 July 1944)
- 9th Battalion, Seaforth Highlanders (from 213th Bde 17 November 1943; to 144 Bde 22 July 1944)

As part of 45th Division (renamed as 134th Infantry Brigade) to end of war:

- 7th Battalion, Royal Ulster Rifles (from 144th Bde 15 November 1943)
- 11th Battalion, Argyll and Sutherland Highlanders (from 45th Bde 23 July 1944)
- 2/6th Battalion, Lancashire Fusiliers ( from 220th Bde 25 July 1944)
- 14th Battalion, Durham Light Infantry (from 209th Bde 15 November 1944)

== Commanders ==
The following officers commanded the brigade:

- Brigadier G.E.M. Whittuck ( until 16 August 1941)
- Brigadier G.H. Gilmore (16 August 1941–1 August 1944)
- Brigadier J.H. Hogshaw (from 1 August 1944)
