= Devon and Cornwall County Division =

- The divisional insignia
- Active: 24 February 1941 –1 December 1941
- Country: United Kingdom
- Branch: British Army
- Type: Static infantry
- Role: Home defence
- Size: 10,000 men

Commanders
- Notable commanders: Sir Frederick Morgan

The Devon and Cornwall County Division was a County Division of the British Army created during the Second World War. It was formed on 28 February 1941, from recently recruited soldiers, in response to the renewed threat of a German invasion. The 10,000-strong division was a static formation, lacking transport, intended to defend possible landing sites along the southern Cornish and Devon coastlines from invading German troops. The creation of the division also helped to free up the more experienced troops, who were then held back from the coastline to be able to launch a counterattack against any potential German landings.

During mid-1941, Germany launched a massive invasion of the Soviet Union, which practically eliminated the threat of an invasion of the United Kingdom. Consequently, the division never saw service in its intended role. With the threat of a German invasion lifted, the British Army began a series of reforms intended to restore balance to the then infantry-heavy organisation. As a result, all nine county divisions were disbanded. The Devon and Cornwall County Division ceased to exist on 1 December, but was subsequently reformed as the 77th Infantry Division.

== Divisional history ==
=== Background ===
In 1940, following the Second World War's Battle of France, the United Kingdom was under threat of invasion from Germany. During the summer, the Battle of Britain dampened this threat. As the year progressed, the size of the British Army increased dramatically as 140 new infantry battalions were raised. During October, with the possibility of a German invasion re-emerging during 1941, these new battalions were formed into independent infantry brigades that were then assigned to newly created County Divisions (a total of nine such formations were raised).

The County Divisions, including the Devon and Cornwall County Division, were around 10,000 men strong and assigned to defend the coastlines of threatened sections of the country, including the manning of coastal artillery. These divisions were largely static, lacking mobility as well as divisional assets such as artillery, engineers, and reconnaissance forces. Using the new recruits in this manner allowed the regular infantry divisions to be freed up from such duties, undertake training, and form an all-important reserve that could be used to counterattack any German landing.

=== Service ===
The Devon and Cornwall County Division was formed on 24 February 1941, consisting of the 203rd Independent Infantry Brigade (Home) under the command of Major-General Charles Allfrey. Three days later, Allfrey was assigned to the 43rd (Wessex) Infantry Division, and Major-General Frederick Morgan took his place. The following day, the division's headquarters was organised from staff previously assigned to South-West Area of Southern Command, and the 209th Independent Infantry Brigade (Home) and the 211th Independent Infantry Brigade (Home) joined the division. On 22 April, General Sir Alan Brooke, the Commander-in-Chief, Home Forces spent the day touring the division and watched several company-size exercises. At the end of October, Major-General Godwin Michelmore assumed command. The Imperial War Museum comments that the division insignia included "the arms of the Duchy of Cornwall" as well Arthur's sword Excalibur to acknowledge an association with the West Country.

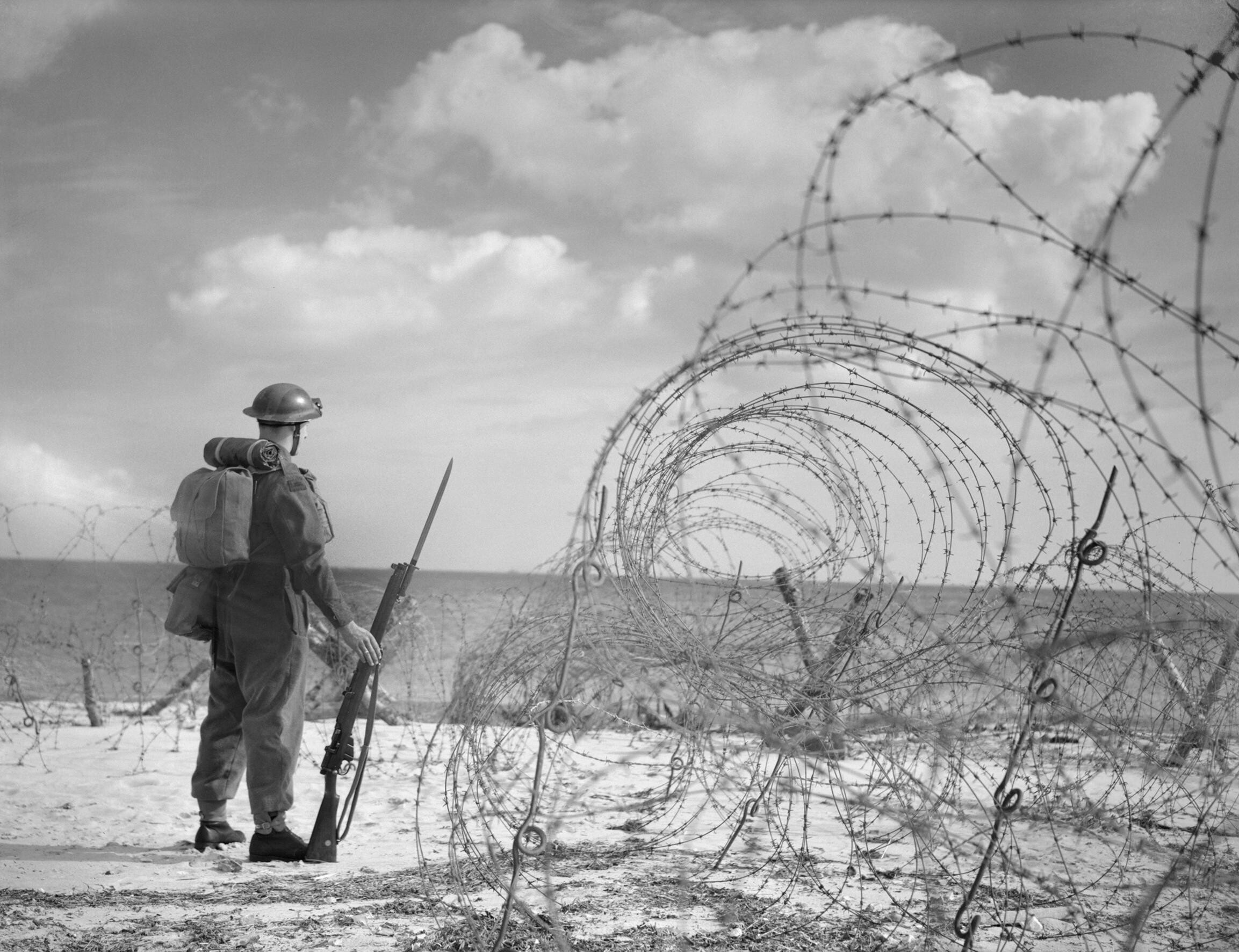
An infantryman, standing among an example of British anti-invasion beach defences, looks out over the English Channel.

The division itself was assigned to VIII Corps, and spread out along the southern coast of Cornwall and Devon. The Dorset County Division was based to the east of the division, and the 48th (South Midland) Infantry Division had been placed in reserve behind both formations. The 203rd Brigade was positioned on the western flank of the division's assigned area, and the 209th Brigade on the eastern. The battalions were spread out defending various potential landing areas and other important locations. The coastal defensive positions the division occupied included tubular scaffolding obstacles on the high water mark, barbed wire, minefields, beach front defensive fighting positions equipped with a range of modern and antiquated weaponry such as Maxim machine guns.

For example, the 9th Battalion, Somerset Light Infantry was based in Plymouth with companies posted to the suburbs of Crownhill and slightly further afield in the nearby village of Wembury. Primarily, the battalion was assigned to defend potential landing areas. In this capacity of a coastal defence unit during an invasion scare, in September 1940 prior to joining the division and while the battalion was based in Somerset, the battalion blocked all roads from the Bristol Channel to Exmoor, and between Minehead and Bridgwater. The battalion was also assigned to protect RAF Roborough, just outside of Plymouth, and was provided with Armadillo armoured fighting vehicles to do so. In addition, the battalion formed an anti-paratroop detachment, which ended up being used to collect Luftwaffe crews that had bailed out in the Plymouth area. Additional duties included aiding in the cleanup effort following raids on Plymouth. Likewise, the 11th Battalion, West Yorkshire Regiment and the 6th Battalion, Duke of Cornwall's Light Infantry were assigned to defend Porthcurno, Cornwall. The 11th Battalion, the Devonshire Regiment were posted to Plymouth, while the 12th Battalion defended Budleigh Salterton, Devon.

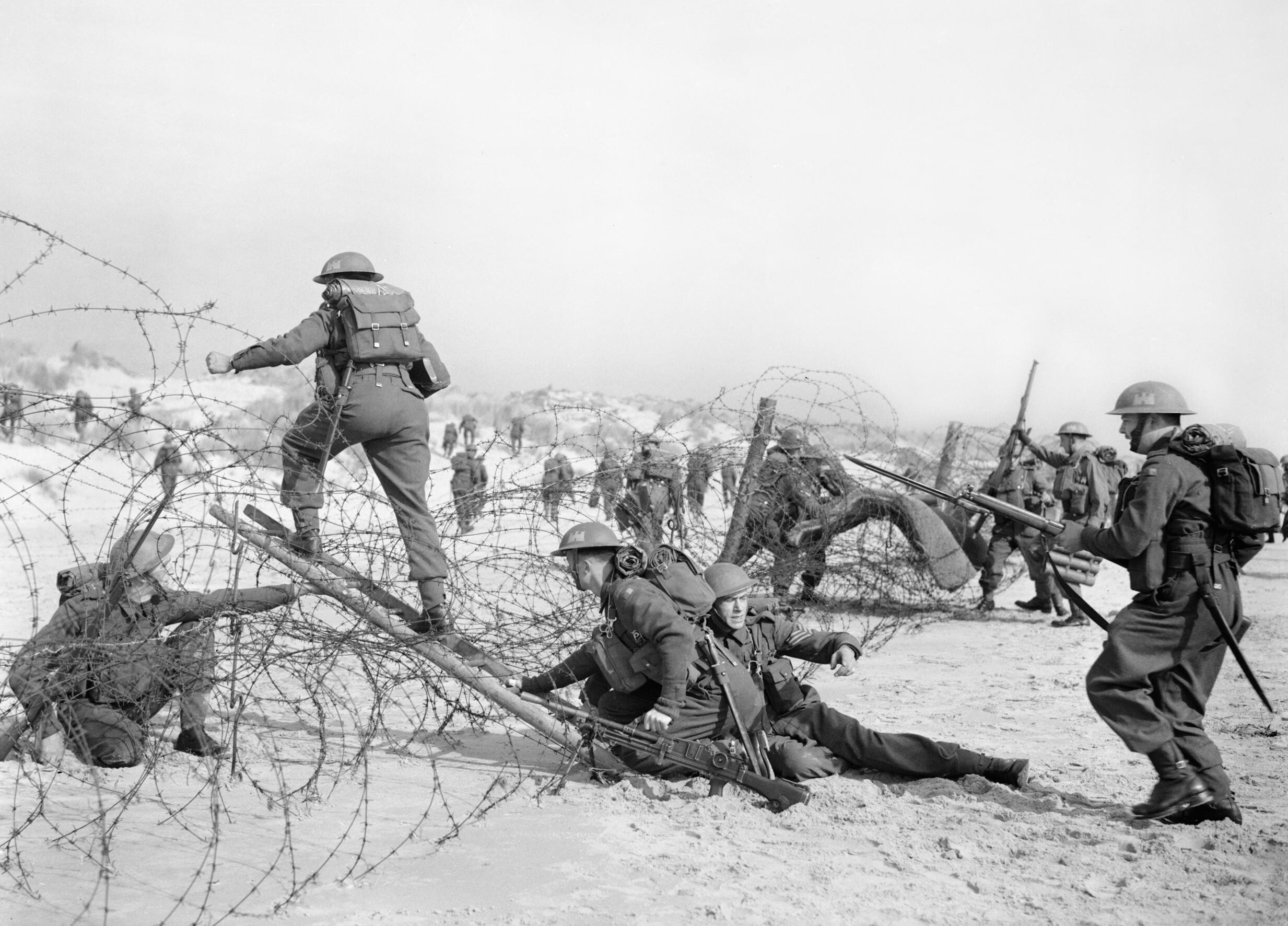
An example of training undertaken by coastal defence battalions.

As the division was engaged full time in its defensive role as well as maintaining constructed defences, it found little time to provide its battalions with field training. As a result, battalions were switched out with those from the 48th (South Midland) Infantry Division for a period of one month. In the event of an actual invasion, it was intended that the battalions return to their original assignments. For example, the 4th Battalion, Oxfordshire and Buckinghamshire Light Infantry (Ox and Bucks) moved to the coastal area and replaced a battalion from the Devon and Cornwall Division who then moved inland for training. The regimental history of the Ox and Bucks noted that they had to leave behind equipment and rear area and specialist personnel in order to make up the equipment deficiencies of the beach defence units in order for them to complete their training. The division did not solely rely on the 48th to provide training, and did engage in its own training activities. However, in an analysis of the use of umpires during such exercises, historian Timothy Harrison Place highlighted an example involving the 8th Battalion, Bedfordshire and Hertfordshire Regiment: "Lance-Corporal R.I. Higgins ... took part in a night patrol that captured the opposing brigadier and his staff. For their trouble the umpires made Higgins and his comrades the victims of a retrospective artillery concentration and the brigadier carried on as if nothing had happened – as indeed did Higgins' patrol, resurrected after a short rest."

=== Demise ===
On 22 June 1941, Germany launched a massive attack upon the Soviet Union; this attack all but removed the threat of a German invasion of the United Kingdom. However, the British still had to consider the threat due to the possibility that the Soviet Union could collapse under the German onslaught and the ease in which Germany could transfer troops back to the west. In late 1941, the arrival of autumn and winter weather meant that the threat of invasion subsided. This, coupled with the production of new equipment for the British Army, allowed the War Office to begin steps to better balance the army due to the large number of infantry units formed during the preceding year and a half. As part of this reform, the County Divisions were disbanded. The 140 recently raised infantry battalions were, on the whole, transferred to other arms of the army to be retrained, primarily within the Royal Artillery and Royal Armoured Corps. (Note: The large intake of men into the army had considerably increased the infantry arm to the detriment of other arms. The reforms intended to address this imbalance, with many of the newly raised battalions being "converted to other arms, particularly artillery and armour". In addition to this, historian F.W. Perry comments, there was considerable pressure "to increase the armoured component [of the army] and build up raiding and special forces". These pressures, and the re-balancing of the military, resulted in seven of the nine County Divisions being disbanded and only two being reformed as infantry divisions.) On 1 December 1941, the Devon and Cornwall County Division was abolished and reformed as the 77th Infantry Division.

== General officers commanding ==
Commanders included:

Appointed	General officer commanding
24 February 1941	Major-General Charles Walter Allfrey
27 February 1941	Major-General Frederick Morgan
30 October 1941	Major-General Godwin Michelmore

== Order of battle ==
Devon and Cornwall County Division

203rd Independent Infantry Brigade (Home)

Main article: 203rd Independent Infantry Brigade (Home)
- 11th Battalion, West Yorkshire Regiment (until 14 July 1941)
- 7th Battalion, East Yorkshire Regiment (until 18 July 1941)
- 8th Battalion, Bedfordshire and Hertfordshire Regiment (until 19 June 1941)
- 6th Battalion, Duke of Cornwall's Light Infantry (until 30 June 1941)
- 8th Battalion, Duke of Wellington's Regiment (until 10 November 1941)
- 12th Battalion, Devonshire Regiment (from 19 July 1941)
- 9th Battalion, Buffs (Royal East Kent Regiment) (from 16 August until 23 November 1941)
- 10th Battalion, Loyal Regiment (North Lancashire) (from 25 November 1941)
- 9th Battalion, Essex Regiment (from 23 November 1941)

209th Independent Infantry Brigade (Home)

Main article: 209th Independent Infantry Brigade (Home)
- 7th Battalion, Buffs (Royal East Kent Regiment) (until 7 November 1941)
- 8th Battalion, Buffs (Royal East Kent Regiment)
- 9th Battalion, Buffs (Royal East Kent Regiment) (until 15 August 1941, then from 24 November 1941)
- 10th Battalion, Buffs (Royal East Kent Regiment)

211th Independent Infantry Brigade (Home)

Main article: 211th Independent Infantry Brigade (Home)
- 11th Battalion, Devonshire Regiment
- 10th Battalion, East Surrey Regiment
- 9th Battalion, Somerset Light Infantry (until 19 May 1941)
- 14th Battalion, Royal Warwickshire Regiment (from 22 June 1941)
