= Robert Pollok (British Army officer) =

British Army general (1884–1979)

Major-General Robert Pollok CB CBE DSO
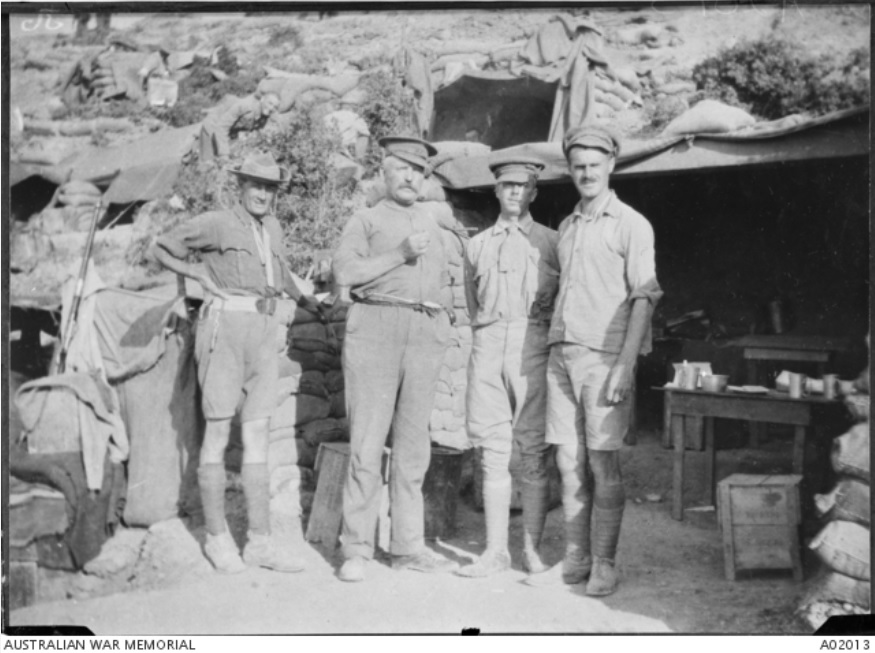
- Brigadier-General Granville Ryrie on the Gallipoli peninsula, March 1915; stood furthest on the right is Captain Robert Valentine Pollok
- Born: 14 February 1884; Ballinasloe, County Galway, Ireland
- Died: 29 September 1979 (aged 95)
- Military career
- Allegiance: United Kingdom
- Branch: British Army
- Service years: 1903–1941
- Rank: Major-General
- Nickname: "Val"
- Service number: 6066
- Units: 15th The King's Hussars; Irish Guards
- Commands: 43rd (Wessex) Infantry Division (1940–41); Northern Ireland District (1938–40); Senior Officers' School, Sheerness (1935–38); 1st Guards Brigade (1931–35); 1st Battalion, Irish Guards (1926–30)
- Conflicts: First World War; Second World War
- Awards: Companion of the Order of the Bath; Commander of the Order of the British Empire; Distinguished Service Order; Mentioned in Despatches (4)

Major-General Robert Valentine Pollok, CB, CBE, DSO (29 September 1884 – 14 February 1979) was an Irish-born British Army officer who served as General Officer Commanding Northern Ireland District from 1938 to 1940.

== Military career ==
After attending Eton College and the Royal Military College, Sandhurst, Pollok was commissioned into the 15th Hussars in 1903. He was appointed Aide-de-Camp to the Lieutenant Governor of United Provinces in India in 1908 and Aide-de-Camp to the Governor General of Australia in 1913.

Pollok served in the First World War with the Australian Forces in Gallipoli and was then transferred to the Irish Guards in 1916. He became commanding officer of the 1st Battalion Irish Guards in 1917, receiving a promotion to acting lieutenant colonel in the process. After the war he attended the Staff College, Camberley, from 1920 to 1921, was appointed Brigade Major for the 1st Guards Brigade at Aldershot Command and then, in 1926, he was re-appointed commanding officer of the 1st Battalion Irish Guards. He was made commander of the 1st Guards Brigade at Aldershot Command in 1931 and commandant of the Senior Officer School at Sheerness in 1935.

Pollok was appointed General Officer Commanding (GOC) Northern Ireland District in 1938 and GOC 43rd (Wessex) Infantry Division in July 1940. He was appointed a Companion of the Order of the Bath in July 1940 and retired in 1941.

== Bibliography ==
- Smart, Nick (2005). Biographical Dictionary of British Generals of the Second World War. Barnsley, South Yorkshire: Pen and Sword Books. ISBN 1844150496.

Military offices
Preceded by Wilfrid Lindsell	Commandant of the Senior Officers' School, Sheerness; 1933–1935	Succeeded by Roderic Petre
Preceded by James Cooke-Collis	GOC British Army in Northern Ireland; 1938–1940	Succeeded by Hubert Huddleston
Preceded by Arthur Percival	GOC 43rd (Wessex) Infantry Division; 1940–1941	Succeeded by Charles Allfrey
