= Hugh Hibbert (British Army officer) =

British Army general (1893–1988)

Major-General Hugh Hibbert DSO
- Born: 10 December 1893; Reading, Berkshire, England
- Died: 22 June 1988 (aged 94); Telford and Wrekin, Shropshire, England
- Military career
- Allegiance: United Kingdom
- Branch: British Army
- Service years: 1913–1946
- Rank: Major-General
- Service number: 10488
- Unit: King's Own Yorkshire Light Infantry
- Commands: 148th Infantry Brigade; 55th (West Lancashire) Infantry Division
- Conflicts: First World War; Second World War
- Awards: Distinguished Service Order

Major-General Hugh Brownlow Hibbert DSO (10 December 1893 – 22 June 1988) was a senior British Army officer.

== Military career ==
Born the son of Rear-Admiral Hugh Thomas Hibbert, Hibbert entered the Royal Military College, Sandhurst, from where he was commissioned as a second lieutenant into the King's Own Yorkshire Light Infantry, on 17 September 1913, shortly before the start of the First World War.

He was deployed to central Norway in April 1940 and saw action during the Norwegian campaign in the Second World War for which he was appointed a Companion of the Distinguished Service Order on 2 August 1940. After being withdrawn from Norway in June 1940, he became commander of the 148th Infantry Brigade in Northern Ireland May 1941 and was engaged in operations to protect the province from German invasion. He went on to become General Officer Commanding 55th (West Lancashire) Infantry Division in the United Kingdom from May 1942 until August 1943, eventually retiring from the army in 1946, a year after the war ended.

== Bibliography ==
- Smart, Nick (2005). Biographical Dictionary of British Generals of the Second World War. Barnesley: Pen & Sword. ISBN 1844150496.

Military offices
| Preceded by Frederick E. Morgan | GOC 55th (West Lancashire) Infantry Division; 1942–1943 | Succeeded by Walter Clutterbuck |
