= Hayman Hayman-Joyce =

British Army general (1897–1958)

Major-General Hayman Hayman-Joyce CBE DSO
- Born: 2 May 1897; Udimore, East Sussex, England
- Died: 7 July 1958 (aged 61); Minehead, Somerset, England
- Burial place: Church of St Mary Magdelene, Exford
- Military career
- Allegiance: United Kingdom
- Branch: British Army
- Service years: 1915–1947
- Rank: Major-General
- Service number: 1399
- Unit: Border Regiment
- Commands: 4th Infantry Division (1943–44); 48th (South Midland) Infantry Division (1941–43); 6th Infantry Brigade (1940–41); 5th Battalion, King's Own Royal Regiment (Lancaster) (1940)
- Conflicts: First World War; Second World War
- Awards: Commander of the Order of the British Empire; Distinguished Service Order

Major-General Hayman John Hayman-Joyce, CBE, DSO (2 May 1897 – 7 July 1958) was a senior British Army officer who commanded the 4th Infantry Division during the Second World War.

== Military career ==
Hayman-Joyce served as a lieutenant in the Border Regiment during the First World War.

After attending the Staff College, Camberley from 1933 to 1934, he was given command of 5th Battalion, King's Own Royal Regiment (Lancaster) in France in 1940. He was appointed Commander of 6th Brigade later that year, General Officer Commanding (GOC) of the 48th (South Midland) Division in December 1941, and GOC of the 4th Infantry Division in August 1943. The 4th Division saw service in North Africa and took part in the allied invasion of Italy under his command. His last appointment was as GOC British Troops in Egypt in 1944, before he retired in 1947.

He married Maydie Swann; they had two daughters and a son.

== Bibliography ==
- Smart, Nick (2005). Biographical Dictionary of British Generals of the Second World War. Barnesley: Pen & Sword. ISBN 1844150496.

Military offices
Preceded by Arthur Grasett	GOC 48th (South Midland) Infantry Division; 1941–1943	Succeeded by Horatio Berney-Ficklin
Preceded by John Hawkesworth	GOC 4th Infantry Division; 1943–1944	Succeeded by Dudley Ward
