= Horatio Berney-Ficklin =

British Army officer (1892–1961)

Major-General Horatio Berney-Ficklin CB MC
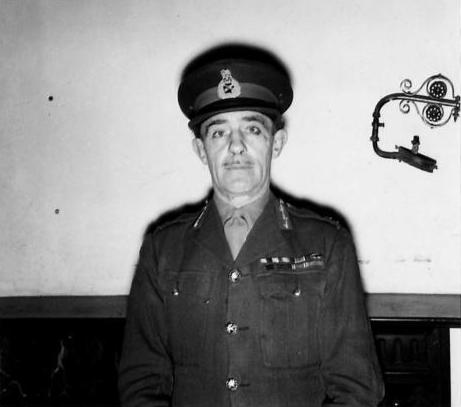
- Berney-Ficklin in January 1942
- Born: 13 June 1892; Cavendish Square, London, England
- Died: 17 February 1961 (aged 68); Cape Town, South Africa
- Military career
- Allegiance: United Kingdom
- Branch: British Army
- Service years: 1912–1948
- Rank: Major-General
- Service number: 21164
- Units: Norfolk Regiment; Highland Light Infantry
- Commands: 55th (West Lancashire) Infantry Division (1944–1945); 48th Infantry (Reserve) Division (1943–1944); 5th Infantry Division (1940–1943); 15th Infantry Brigade (1939–1940); 2nd Battalion, Highland Light Infantry (1936–1939); 5th Battalion, Norfolk Regiment (1929–1930)
- Conflicts: First World War; Russian Civil War; Arab revolt in Palestine; Second World War
- Awards: Companion of the Order of the Bath; Military Cross; Mentioned in Despatches (2)

Major-General Horatio Pettus Mackintosh Berney-Ficklin, CB, MC (13 June 1892 – 17 February 1961) was a British Army officer who served in both the First and Second World Wars. During the latter, he commanded for just over three years – from July 1940 until August 1943 – the 5th Infantry Division (nicknamed "The Globe Trotters"), the most widely travelled division of the British Army during the Second World War.

== Early life and military career ==
Born on 13 June 1892, the son of Philip Berney-Ficklin and Janet Margaret Tennant (Rita) Mackintosh, Horatio was educated at Rugby School and Jesus College, Cambridge. He had a younger brother, Alexander Tennent Mackintosh, born on 10 May 1895. After attending the Officer Training Corps (OTC) at Rugby School, he was commissioned as a second lieutenant (on probation) into the Special Reserve of the Norfolk Regiment (later the Royal Norfolk Regiment) on 18 May 1912. He was confirmed in his rank of second lieutenant on 26 February 1913.

Berney-Ficklin was gazetted into the 1st Battalion, Norfolk Regiment in June 1914, shortly before the outbreak of the First World War. Promoted to the temporary rank of lieutenant on 22 September 1914, he transferred to the 8th (Service) Battalion, Norfolk Regiment, a Kitchener's Army unit in which his brother was also serving, which formed part of the 53rd Brigade of the 18th (Eastern) Division, as the battalion's adjutant. Promoted to the temporary rank of captain on 11 January 1915 and lieutenant on 26 February, his battalion departed for the Western Front in July. He was awarded the Military Cross (MC) on 5 June 1916 and was promoted to temporary major on 1 July, the first day of the Battle of the Somme in which his division played a significant role. The following year he became brigade major of the 152nd (Seaforth Highlanders) Brigade, part of the 51st (Highland) Division, a Territorial Force (TF) formation. On 9 July 1917, the same year of his fathers' death, he married Audrey Brenda Knyvet Wilson at St Peter Mancroft, Norwich. In March 1918, during the German Army's Spring Offensive, Berney-Ficklin was wounded and taken prisoner.

== Between the wars ==
Released after the war in 1919 and, remaining in the army, Berney-Ficklin was sent to Russia to become liaison officer at Brigadier General Edmund Ironside's GHQ during the North Russia Intervention, where he was again wounded. He was promoted to brevet major on 5 January 1921. Between 1920 and 1925 he transferred to the TF (later renamed the Territorial Army) as a temporary captain and was adjutant of the Bristol University Officer Training Corps (OTC). However, in August 1926 he retired from the army with the rank of major. He joined the Army Reserve of Officers and in January 1929 was promoted to lieutenant colonel and assumed command of the 5th Battalion, Norfolk Regiment, a TA unit. In November 1930 he relinquished his commission in the TA upon his reappointment to the Regular Army.

In December 1932 Berney-Ficklin, having divorced his wife, transferred from the Norfolk Regiment to the Highland Light Infantry (HLI) as a major. In July 1934 he was promoted to brevet lieutenant colonel and, in December 1936, lieutenant colonel, and became Commanding Officer (CO) of the 2nd Battalion of his new regiment, which was then serving in India. While in India he was promoted to the local rank of brigadier and given temporary command of the Peshawar Brigade, holding this post in addition to commanding his battalion, from 27 June until 9 October 1938, reverting to lieutenant colonel. Soon afterwards the battalion was moved to Palestine where it remained during the Arab revolt. For his Palestinian service he was later mentioned in despatches.

In June 1939 Berney-Ficklin handed over command of the battalion to Lieutenant Colonel Bernard Campbell Fletcher and returned to England where, on 1 July, he received a promotion to the temporary rank of brigadier (with seniority backdated two years) and the permanent rank of colonel on the same date and was given command of the 15th Infantry Brigade, in succession to Brigadier Henry Willcox. The brigade was one of three which formed part of the 5th Infantry Division, then stationed in North Yorkshire as part of the Catterick Garrison, whose General Officer Commanding (GOC) was then Major General Harold Franklyn.

== Second World War ==
=== France and Norway ===
Shortly after the outbreak of the Second World War in September, the brigade was sent to France, arriving there in early October as an independent formation, where it became part of the British Expeditionary Force (BEF) and served initially under the direct command of BEF General Headquarters (GHQ) and later Lieutenant General Sir John Dill's I Corps, as the 5th Division was, at this stage, still not fully formed. However, the divisional HQ arrived in France in late December, and the 15th Brigade reverted to the 5th Division, still under Major General Harold Franklyn, which now included, in addition to Berney-Ficklin's 15th Brigade, Brigadier Miles Dempsey's 13th Brigade and Brigadier Montagu Stopford's 17th Brigade, along with supporting divisional troops.

The first few months of the conflict in the west were, for Berney-Ficklin's 15th Brigade, spent relatively inactive – this period of time being known as the "Phoney War" – except for a brief period on the Saar front with the French in January and February 1940, where the brigade was able to see light action, confined mostly to skirmishing and patrolling. In mid-April his brigade was withdrawn from the division and France and sent to Norway shortly after the German invasion of that country. He preceded his brigade, which had returned briefly to Scotland, as he had been selected to command the British forces intended to take Trondheim as part of Operation Hammer. Major General Frederick Hotblack, the original force commander, had suffered a stroke and Berney-Ficklin was selected to replace him, temporarily relinquishing command of his brigade, which went on to fight in the Norwegian Campaign with great distinction, although at the cost of almost 900 casualties, and later had to be evacuated. However, travelling by air to Norway via Orkney to take over his new command, Berney-Ficklin's plane crashed at Kirkwall, injuring him and several of his staff and putting him out of action, the command eventually passing to Major General Bernard Paget. For his services thus far in the war, however, Berney-Ficklin, reverting temporarily to the rank of full colonel, was mentioned in despatches.

=== Service in Britain ===
Having been deemed fit for duty, Berney-Ficklin was re-promoted to temporary brigadier on 25 May and briefly reassumed command of the 15th Brigade, then serving in Scotland under Scottish Command, awaiting the arrival of the rest of the division. On 19 July he was promoted to the acting rank of major general and succeeded Harold Franklyn, who was given the command of VIII Corps, as GOC of the 5th Infantry Division, which he would command for the next three years, making him one of the longest serving British divisional commanders of the war, only Robert Ross of the 53rd (Welsh) Division and Ivor Thomas of the 43rd (Wessex) Division commanding for longer. The division, now reunited with all three brigades under command, was then in Scotland under Scottish Command, reforming after fighting in France and participating in the Dunkirk evacuation, where heavy casualties were sustained to both the 13th and 17th Brigades. The division's three brigades, the 13th, 15th and 17th, were now commanded by Brigadiers Douglas Wimberley, James Gammell and Montagu Stopford, respectively.

The division spent most of the rest of 1940 reforming, reequipping and retraining, absorbing large numbers of reinforcements, mostly recently called-up conscripts, to replace the heavy losses suffered in Norway and France. The division was moved to Western Command in North West England in late October. The division was serving under III Corps, then commanded by Lieutenant General James Marshall-Cornwall until he was replaced by Desmond Anderson the following month, and trained throughout the winter in numerous exercises. Remaining there until March 1941, the division was then sent to Northern Ireland, again coming under Desmond Anderson's III Corps, to help prevent a possible German invasion of the country via Southern Ireland. On 19 July 1941 Berney-Ficklin was promoted to the temporary rank of major general.

=== Overseas service ===
Returning to Northern England in mid-January 1942, the division left soon after, in late March, destined to be sent to India. The war situation had changed by this time, with the Japanese entering the war in December 1941, which was followed soon after by a string of Japanese victories, in Malaya and Singapore, and British and Indian and other Allied forces on the retreat, causing India to be threatened. Reinforcements, therefore, were desperately needed, Berney-Ficklin's 5th Division being among them. The division, stopping briefly in South Africa, then crossed the Indian Ocean, where it lost both the 13th and 17th Brigades to Operation Ironclad, the invasion of Madagascar. The rest of the division arrived in Bombay in May, travelling to Ranchi soon after. The monsoon season, however, brought operations in Burma and India to a close and the division, now reformed with all three brigades, was sent to Persia, after Berney-Ficklin went personally to General Sir Archibald Wavell, the Commander-in-Chief, India and requested that the 5th Division be sent there, instead of the 2nd Division. Wavell agreed. On 13 June 1942, on his fiftieth birthday, Berney-Ficklin was made a Companion of the Order of the Bath (CB).

At the time there was fear that the German Army, then fighting the Soviet Red Army on the Eastern Front where it recently launched an offensive, carrying it across the Don and threatening the Caucasus, and there were not enough British or Indian troops to prevent a German breakthrough if Soviet resistance collapsed. Arriving there in late September 1942, the division formed part of III Corps, still under Desmond Anderson, itself part of the Tenth Army, commanded by General Sir Edward Quinan, itself part of Paiforce (formerly Iraqforce) under the newly created Persia and Iraq Command. In early October the division concentrated in Kermanshah before moving to Qum for the winter, where training continued, although it was made difficult by the severe weather. However, the German defeat at Stalingrad in February 1943 removed the threat of invasion and the division was available for service elsewhere. Travelling and training in both amphibious landings and mountain warfare in the Lebanon, Egypt and Syria, the division became part of Lieutenant General Miles Dempsey's XIII Corps, itself part of the British Eighth Army, under General Sir Bernard Montgomery. Berney-Ficklin, promoted on 5 May 1943 to permanent major general (with seniority backdated to 17 November 1941), was already familiar with Dempsey, as the latter had commanded the 13th Brigade while the former commanded the 15th Brigade over three years before.

=== Sicily and return to Britain ===
On 10 July Berney-Ficklin's 5th Division landed on Sicily as part of Operation Husky, the Allied invasion of Sicily. They were amongst the first British troops to land in Europe for more than three years. Before the day was over his division had captured Syracuse, with Augusta falling soon days later. Thereafter the division, aiming for Messina, who had faced only light resistance from the Italian Army, faced stiffening opposition from the Germans, in particular from the Hermann Göring Division in the Plain of Catania. Before the campaign was over, however, on 3 August Berney-Ficklin was relieved of his command and replaced as GOC by Major General Gerard Bucknall, a protégé of Montgomery's who was two years younger, and returned to England. Despite being a popular GOC, his performance in Sicily had impressed neither Montgomery or Dempsey, thus ending Berney-Ficklin's long association with the division. Ironically Bucknall, who commanded the 5th Division in the early stages of the Italian campaign before being promoted to the command of XXX Corps in the Normandy campaign, would himself be relieved of his command exactly a year later, for much the same reason as Berney-Ficklin was relieved. On 5 August Berney-Ficklin, for his services in Persia and Iraq, was mentioned in despatches.

In early September, however, shortly after returning to England, Berney-Ficklin became GOC of the 48th Infantry (Reserve) Division, succeeding Major General Hayman Hayman-Joyce. The division, originally a first-line Territorial Army (TA) which had fought with distinction in France in 1940, had been converted into a reserve formation in December 1942 and was now responsible for the training of soldiers who had completed their initial training and corps training. The division was not organised for active service and provided an additional five weeks of training for soldiers of all arms before they were drafted overseas.

In mid-July 1944, after handing over the 48th Division to Major General William Bradshaw, he then became GOC of the 55th (West Lancashire) Infantry Division, succeeding Major General Walter Clutterbuck. Unlike the 48th Division, the 55th Division was a field formation but remained in the United Kingdom throughout the war and was then serving in Northern Ireland under command of British Troops in Northern Ireland.

== Postwar ==
After the war Berney-Ficklin presided over a British Military Tribunal convened at Lüneburg from 17 September to 17 November 1945 to try suspected war criminals from the Bergen-Belsen concentration camp. Serving as Colonel of the Royal Norfolk Regiment from 1 May 1946 until 4 October 1947 Berney-Ficklin retired from the army on 14 January 1948, due to disability. He moved with his new wife, the daughter of a Russian general, to Cape Town, South Africa, where he died on 17 February 1961, at the age of 68.

== Bibliography ==
- Mead, Richard (2007). Churchill's Lions: A Biographical Guide to the Key British Generals of World War II. Stroud: Spellmount. ISBN 978-1-86227-431-0.
- Smart, Nick (2005). Biographical Dictionary of British Generals of the Second World War. Barnesley: Pen & Sword. ISBN 1844150496.
- Montgomery, Bernard (1991). Stephen Brooks (ed.). Montgomery and the Eighth Army: A Selection from the Diaries, Correspondence and other Papers of Field Marshal The Viscount Montgomery of Alamein, August 1942 to December 1943. Bodley Head for the Army Records Society, 1991. ISBN 0-370-31723-8.

Military offices
Preceded by Harold Franklyn	GOC 5th Infantry Division; 1940–1943	Succeeded by Gerard Bucknall
Preceded by Hayman Hayman-Joyce	GOC 48th Infantry (Reserve) Division; 1943–1944	Succeeded by William Bradshaw
Preceded by Walter Clutterbuck	GOC 55th (West Lancashire) Infantry Division; 1944–1945	Post disbanded
Honorary titles
Preceded by Sir Peter Strickland	Colonel of the Royal Norfolk Regiment; 1946–1947	Succeeded by John Daunt
