= Walter Clutterbuck =

British Army general (1894–1987)

Major-General Walter Clutterbuck DSO MC & Bar
- Born: 17 November 1894; Chippenham, Wiltshire, England
- Died: 2 February 1987 (aged 92); Wensleydale, North Yorkshire, England
- Military career
- Allegiance: United Kingdom
- Branch: British Army
- Service years: 1913–1946
- Rank: Major-General
- Service number: 8261
- Unit: Royal Scots Fusiliers
- Commands: 55th (West Lancashire) Infantry Division (1943–1944); 1st Infantry Division (1941–1943); 10th Infantry Brigade (1940–1941); 1st Battalion, Royal Scots Fusiliers (1939–1940)
- Conflicts: First World War; Russian Civil War; Second World War
- Awards: Distinguished Service Order; Military Cross & Bar; Mentioned in Despatches; Order of the Crown of Italy

Major-General Walter Edmond Clutterbuck, DSO, MC & Bar (17 November 1894 – 2 February 1987) was a British Army officer who fought during both the First and Second World Wars.

== Early life and military career ==
Born in Chippenham, Wiltshire, England, on 17 November 1894, the son of Hardenhuish squire Edmund Henry Clutterbuck and Madeline Charlotte Raikes, Walter Edmond Clutterbuck was educated at Cheltenham College and later entered the Royal Military College, Sandhurst, where, on 17 September 1913, he was commissioned into the Royal Scots Fusiliers of the British Army.

Shortly after the First World War began in August 1914, Clutterbuck was dispatched along with his battalion to England, where it became part of the 21st Brigade of the 7th Division, soon after the outbreak of war. The battalion arrived on the Western Front in October where it fought in the First Battle of Ypres and sustained very heavy casualties. Clutterbuck was promoted to the temporary rank of lieutenant on 31 October 1914 (made permanent in January 1915), and promoted to captain 20 March 1916. From 15 October 1915 he served as adjutant of the 1/10th Battalion, London Regiment, part of the 162nd (East Midland) Brigade of the 54th (East Anglian) Division, in Gallipoli, Egypt and Palestine, later becoming adjutant of the Suffolk Yeomanry, and finally becoming a brigade major with the 232nd Brigade. He ended the war having been awarded the Military Cross (MC) and Bar, the Order of the Crown of Italy, was twice wounded in action and was mentioned in despatches. His MC citation reads:

During the attack on the Turkish trenches near Et Tireh on September 19th, 1918, he showed great courage and devotion to duty. He was of the utmost assistance to his Brigadier throughout the action, both by keeping him informed by personal reconnaissance of the situation in the firing line, and in bringing up and directing the advance of reserves. Owing to the extreme rapidity of our advance, normal methods of communication almost entirely failed, and Captain Clutterbuck was the principal, and at times, the only, method of communication with Bde. HQ. units and with the Division.

His older brother, David Clutterbuck, a lieutenant in the Royal Field Artillery, was not so fortunate, having been killed in action in May 1917.

In October 1919, after serving in Russia during the Russian Civil War, Clutterbuck married Gwendolin Atterbury Younger; they had one son and two daughters.

== Between the wars ==
Clutterbuck spent most of the interwar period as a captain, after relinquishing his temporary major's rank and GSO2 assignment in September 1919. He was promoted to major on 8 November 1933, later serving as a brigade major with the 156th (Scottish Rifles) Brigade from 1 April 1935 until 11 March 1937. On 30 August 1939, he was promoted to lieutenant colonel, and became commanding officer of the 1st Battalion, Royal Scots Fusiliers, then in Poona, India.

== Second World War ==
With his battalion, Clutterbuck returned to the United Kingdom in July 1940, ten months after the outbreak of the Second World War, which soon became part of Brigadier Sir Oliver Leese's 29th Independent Infantry Brigade Group. In October he was promoted to the acting rank of brigadier and succeeded Brigadier Evelyn Barker in command of the 10th Infantry Brigade, part of the 4th Infantry Division, stationed in the United Kingdom in Southern England awaiting a German invasion.

On 18 November 1941 Clutterbuck was promoted to the general officer rank of acting major general and became General Officer Commanding (GOC) of the 1st Infantry Division in succession to Major General Edwin Morris. The division was a Regular Army formation, with a few Territorial Army (TA) units, which, like the 4th Division, had fought in France in 1940 and had recently moved to East Anglia, serving under Lieutenant-General Kenneth Anderson's II Corps. On 3 February 1942 Clutterbuck's permanent rank was made colonel (with seniority backdated to 1 January). In June 1942 the division was converted into a 'mixed' division of two infantry brigades and one tank brigade, before reverting to a standard infantry division in November. On 18 November, a year after he was made an acting major-general, Clutterbuck's rank of major-general was made temporary, with his permanent rank still being colonel.

In late February 1943 the division left the United Kingdom, destined for French North Africa, where, from late April, it was involved in heavy fighting in the final stages of the Tunisian campaign, mainly under the command of Lieutenant General Charles Allfrey's V Corps, part of Lieutenant General Kenneth Anderson's British First Army until the campaign ended on 13 May. Despite suffering heavy casualties the division earned three Victoria Crosses and captured thousands of Axis soldiers. In mid-June, the division took part in Operation Corkscrew, the Allied invasion of the Italian island of Pantelleria and, despite Clutterbuck's fears that his division would suffer heavy losses, casualties were minimal, with only one man being killed and the Italian garrison of 14,000 surrendered. The division returned to North Africa soon after. However, on 31 July he handed over command of the division, which he had now commanded for over twenty months, to Major General Gerald Templer, who had briefly been his corps commander in England, and returned to the United Kingdom. For his services in North Africa he was awarded the Distinguished Service Order (DSO) on 5 August.

On 15 August Clutterbuck became GOC of the 55th (West Lancashire) Infantry Division, a first line TA formation. The division was badly understrength, having been reduced to the Lower Establishment in January 1942, and was not fit for active service, although in May 1944 it was raised to the Higher Establishment, and returned to England around the same time. Clutterbuck remained with the division until handing over to Major General Horatio Berney-Ficklin on 13 July 1944.

== Post-war ==
After the war Clutterbuck retired from the army on 18 October 1946, with the honorary rank of major general. He eventually settled in North Yorkshire, where he farmed, and remained there until his death on 2 February 1987 at the age of 92. He was a local councillor and was Chairman of the Bedale Hunt for many years.

== Bibliography ==
- Smart, Nick (2005). Biographical Dictionary of British Generals of the Second World War. Barnesley: Pen & Sword. ISBN 1844150496.

Military offices
Preceded by Edwin Morris	GOC 1st Infantry Division; 1941–1943	Succeeded by Gerald Templer
Preceded by Hugh Hibbert	GOC 55th (West Lancashire) Infantry Division; 1943–1944	Succeeded by Horatio Berney-Ficklin
