= British County Divisions =

Divisions of the British Army

The British County Divisions of the Second World War were raised by the British Army in 1941 as a defence against a planned German invasion of Britain. They were static formations which were supposed to command the Independent Infantry Brigades (Home) which were on anti-invasion duties. Each coast in danger had its own County Division.

The divisions were:

- Devon and Cornwall County Division
- Dorset County Division
- Durham and North Riding County Division
- Essex County Division (formerly the West Sussex County Division)
- Hampshire County Division
- Lincolnshire County Division
- Norfolk County Division
- Northumberland County Division
- West Sussex County Division (later, the Essex County Division)
- Yorkshire County Division

These formations had none of the usual divisional units that other permanent divisions had. Any they commanded were temporarily on loan from other formations.

== Sources ==
- Forty, George (2009). "Appendix 1 - British Army Divisions of the Second World War - County Divisions". Companion to the British Army 1939-45. The History Press. ISBN 9780750951395.
