= 209th Infantry Brigade =

- Active: 13 October 1940 – 1 September 1944
- Country: United Kingdom
- Branch: British Army
- Type: Infantry Brigade
- Role: Home Defence

The 209th Infantry Brigade (209 Bde) was a Home Defence formation of the British Army during the Second World War.

== Origin ==
The brigade was formed for service in the United Kingdom on 13 October 1940 by No 9 Infantry Training Group in the South West Area of Southern Command. Under the name of 209th Independent Infantry Brigade (Home) it was initially composed of newly raised battalions of the Buffs (Royal East Kent Regiment).

== Composition ==
The composition of 209 Brigade was as follows:

- As part of the Devon and Cornwall County Division
  - 7th Battalion, Buffs (Royal East Kent Regiment) (until 7 November 1941, when it converted to 141st Regiment Royal Armoured Corps)
  - 8th Battalion, Buffs (Royal East Kent Regiment) (until 22 September 1942)
  - 9th Battalion, Buffs (Royal East Kent Regiment) (21 October 1940 – 15 August 1941, 24 – 30 November 1941)
  - 10th Battalion, Buffs (Royal East Kent Regiment) (until 30 November 1941)
- As part of the 77th Infantry Division
  - 8th Battalion, Buffs (Royal East Kent Regiment) (1 December 1941 – 22 September 1942)
  - 9th Battalion, Buffs (Royal East Kent Regiment) (1 December 1941 – 25 October 1943)
  - 10th Battalion, Buffs (Royal East Kent Regiment) (1 December 1941 – 25 October 1943)
  - 11th (Jersey Militia) Battalion, Hampshire Regiment (24 September 1942 – 30 November 1944)
  - 14th Battalion, Durham Light Infantry (25 September 1942 – 14 November 1944)
  - 18th Battalion, Welch Regiment (20 November 1943 – 19 September 1944)
  - 6th Battalion, Northamptonshire Regiment (19 November 1943 – 30 November 1944)
  - 2/5th (Glamorganshire) Battalion, Welch Regiment (19 – 30 September 1944)
  - 11th Battalion, South Staffordshire Regiment (15 – 30 November 1944)
- As Part of the 45th Division (renamed as the 136th Infantry Brigade)
  - 11th (Jersey Militia) Battalion, Hampshire Regiment (from 1 December 1944)
  - 6th Battalion, Northamptonshire Regiment (from 1 December 1944)
  - 2/5th (Glamorganshire) Battalion, Welch Regiment (from 1 December 1944)
  - 11th Battalion, South Staffordshire Regiment (from 1 December 1944)

== Commanders ==
The commanders of 209 Brigade were:

- Brigadier C.C. Hewitt (until 21 May 1941)
- Brigadier G. St G. Robinson (21 May – 20 October 1941)
- Brigadier R.C. Matthews (28 October 1941 – 17 August 1942)
- Brigadier W.G. Hewett (10 August 1942 – 10 August 1944)
- Brigadier N.P. Proctor (10 August 1944 – 14 February 1945)
- Brigadier A. Gilroy (from 14 February 1945)

== Service ==
On 28 February 1941, HQ South West Area formed Devon and Cornwall County Division, which included the 209th Brigade. On 1 December 1941, the County Division was redesignated 77th Infantry Division and the brigade became 209th Infantry Brigade. The 77th was a Reserve Division, later designated a Holding Division with the role of sorting, retraining and temporarily holding personnel before they were reassigned to other units. It was formally disbanded on 1 September 1944 when its divisional and brigade HQs adopted the numbers of the recently disbanded 45th (Holding) Division. 209 Brigade was redesignated 135th Infantry Brigade. All these formations remained within the United Kingdom throughout the war.
