= 211th Infantry Brigade =

- Active: 11 October 1940 – 1 September 1944
- Country: United Kingdom
- Branch: British Army
- Type: Infantry Brigade
- Role: Home Defence

The 211th Infantry Brigade was a Home Defence formation of the British Army during the Second World War.

== Origin ==
The brigade was formed for service in the United Kingdom on 11 October 1940 by No 11 Infantry Training Group in the South West Area of Southern Command. Initially under the name of 211th Independent Infantry Brigade (Home) it was composed of newly raised battalions.

== Composition ==
The composition of 211 Brigade was as follows:

- As part of the Devon and Cornwall County Division
  - 11th Battalion, Devonshire Regiment (until 30 November 1941)
  - 10th Battalion, East Surrey Regiment (until 30 November 1941)
  - 9th Battalion, Somerset Light Infantry (until 19 May 1941)
  - 14th Battalion, Royal Warwickshire Regiment (22 June- 3 October 1941)
- As part of the 77th Infantry Division
  - 11th Battalion, Devonshire Regiment (1 December 1941 – 20 September 1942)
  - 10th Battalion, East Surrey Regiment (1 December 1941 – 2 January 1943)
  - 13th Battalion, Queen's Royal Regiment (West Surrey) (20 September 1942 – 2 January 1943)
  - 2/6th Battalion, Lancashire Fusiliers (5 October 1942 – 2 January 1943)
- As part of the 80th (Reserve) Division
  - 13th Battalion, Queen's Royal Regiment (West Surrey) (3 January 1943 – 20 July 1944)
  - 2/6th Battalion, Lancashire Fusiliers (3 January 1943 – 25 October 1943)
  - 7th Battalion, Queen's Own Royal West Kent Regiment (5 January 1943 – 20 April 1944)
  - 8th Battalion, Devonshire Regiment (3 November 1943 – 23 July 1944)
  - 12th Battalion, Royal Fusiliers (17 September 1943 – 21 July 1944)
  - 5th Battalion, King's Shropshire Light Infantry (from 20 July 1944 – 31 August 1944)
  - 8th Battalion, Worcestershire Regiment (25 July 1944 – 31 August 1944)
  - 8th Battalion, Royal Warwickshire Regiment (22 July 1944 – 31 August 1944)
  - 9th (Caernarvonshire and Anglesey) Battalion, Royal Welch Fusiliers (23 July 1944 – 31 August 1944)
- As part of the 38th (Reserve) Division (renamed the 114th Infantry Brigade)
  - 5th Battalion, King's Shropshire Light Infantry (from 1 September 1944)
  - 8th Battalion, Worcestershire Regiment (from 1 September 1944)
  - 8th Battalion, Royal Warwickshire Regiment (from 1 September 1944)
  - 9th (Caernarvonshire and Anglesey) Battalion, Royal Welch Fusiliers (from 1 September 1944)

== Commanders ==
The commanders of 211 Brigade were:

- Brigadier C.H. Woodhouse (until 1 September 1941)
- Brigadier T. Fairfax-Ross (1 September 1941 – 4 August 1944)
- Brigadier P.N. White (from 4 August 1944)

== Service ==
On 28 February 1941, HQ South West Area formed Devon and Cornwall County Division, which included the brigade. On 1 December 1941, the County Division was redesignated 77th Infantry Division and the brigade became 211th Infantry Brigade. The 77th was later designated a Reserve Division. 211 Brigade was transferred to 80th Infantry (Reserve) Division on 2 January 1943. When the 80th was disbanded on 1 September 211 Brigade was redesignated 114th Infantry Brigade in 38th (Reserve) Division. All these formations remained within the UK throughout the war.
