= Gerald Thubron =

British Army officer (1903–1992)

Brigadier Gerald Thubron DSO OBE
- Born: 13 June 1903; London, England
- Died: 6 September 1992 (aged 89); Piltdown, East Sussex, England
- Military career
- Allegiance: United Kingdom
- Branch: British Army
- Service years: 1924–1956
- Rank: Brigadier
- Service number: 28077
- Unit: North Staffordshire Regiment
- Commands: 2nd Battalion, North Staffordshire Regiment; 11th Infantry Brigade; Senior Officers' School, Sheerness
- Conflicts: Second World War
- Awards: Order of the British Empire; Companion of the Distinguished Service Order; Mentioned in despatches

Brigadier Gerald Ernest Thubron DSO OBE (13 July 1903 – 6 September 1992) was an officer in the British Army.

== Biography ==
Born the son of Olympic boatsman Emile Thubron in London, Gerald Thubron was educated at Lancing College and the Royal Military College, Sandhurst and was given a commission in the North Staffordshire Regiment in 1924.

In 1942 he fought with the First British Infantry Division in the Tunisian campaign and in January 1944 was General Staff Officer of the division which spearheaded the Allied landing at Anzio. He was awarded an OBE in 1944, followed by a DSO in 1945 as commander of the North Staffordshires in the ensuing Italian campaign, and by the end of the war had been promoted to Brigade commander.

After the war, he served as Commandant of the Senior Officers' School for two years and was then Senior Army Liaison Officer in Canada. He retired as Deputy Director of Military Training at the War Office in 1956.

He was given the colonelcy of the North Staffordshires in 1958 until the amalgamation with the South Staffordshire Regiment in 1959. He returned in 1961 to serve as Colonel of the resultant Staffordshire Regiment until 1966.

He died in Piltdown, East Sussex in 1992. He had married Eve Dryden and had two children; his son is the writer Colin Thubron.

Military offices
Preceded by James Renton	Commandant of the Senior Officers' School; 1945–1948	Succeeded by Thomas Scott
