= Great Cheverell =

Village in Wiltshire, England

Coordinates: 51.288°N 02.026°W

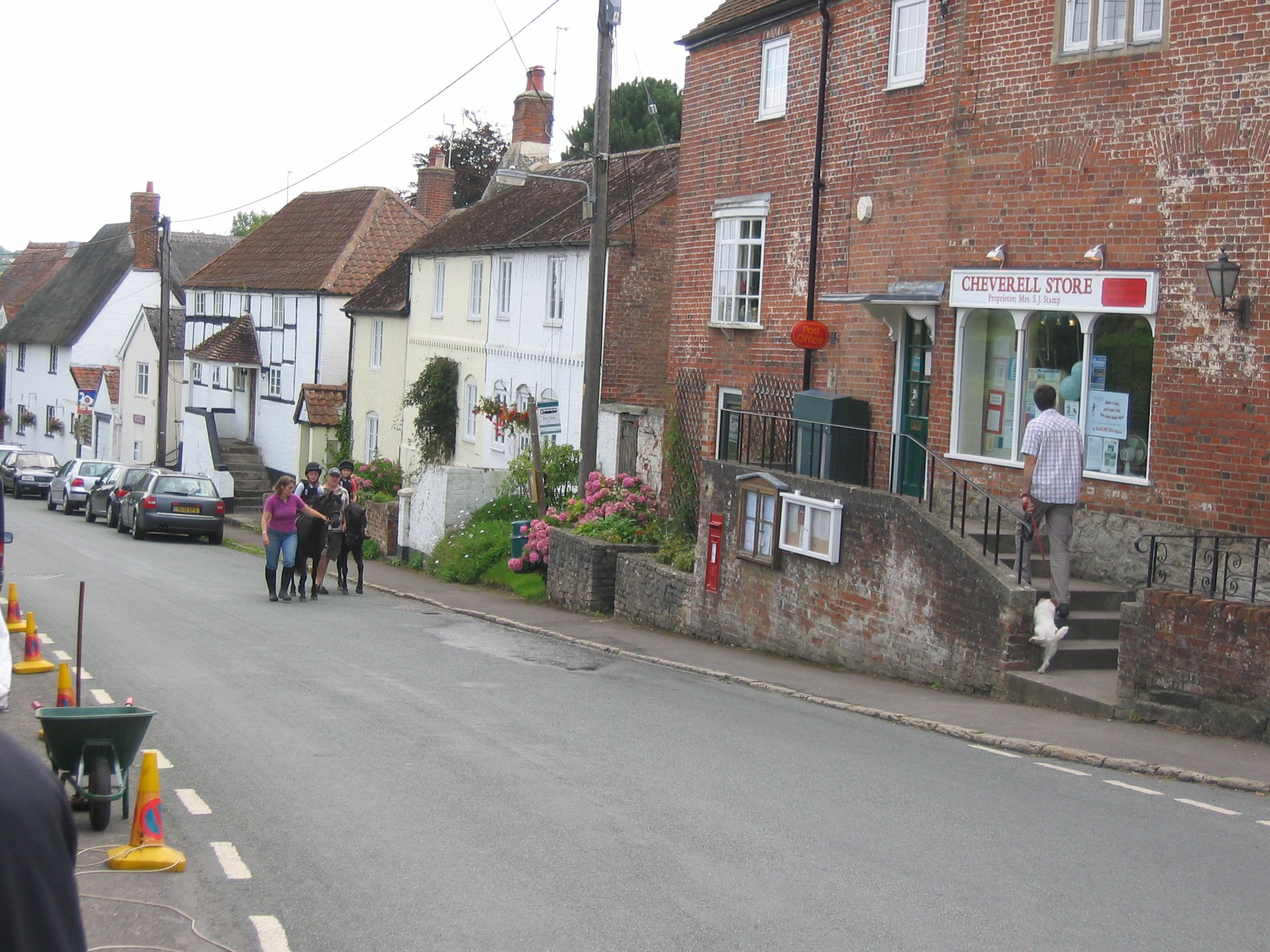
- Village centre

- Location within Wiltshire
- Population: 987 (in 2011)
- OS grid reference: ST982543
- Civil parish: Cheverell Magna
- Unitary authority: Wiltshire
- Ceremonial county: Wiltshire
- Region: South West
- Country: England
- Sovereign state: United Kingdom
- Post town: Devizes
- Postcode district: SN10
- Dialling code: 01380
- Police: Wiltshire
- Fire: Dorset and Wiltshire
- Ambulance: South Western
- UK Parliament: Melksham and Devizes
- Website: Parish Council

Great Cheverell is a village and civil parish in Wiltshire, England, 5 miles (8.0 km) south of Devizes. In some sources the Latinized name of Cheverell Magna is used, especially when referring to the ecclesiastical parish.

The parish includes Great Cheverell Hill, a biological Site of Special Scientific Interest consisting of unimproved species-rich chalk grassland on the northern edge of Salisbury Plain.

== History ==
A large settlement of 111 households was recorded at Chevrel in the Domesday Book of 1086. There were 73 taxpayers in 1377. Population of the parish peaked around the time of the 1841 census, which recorded 295; then fell as agricultural employment decreased, reaching 174 at the 1951 census. Subsequent increases reflect housebuilding and employment at HM Prison Erlestoke.

Two manors, Cheverell Burnell and Cheverell Hales, came into the ownership of the Hungerford family in the 15th century and were given as endowments to Heytesbury almshouse until 1863, when much of the parish was acquired by Simon Watson Taylor as an addition to the Erlestoke estate bought by his father, George Watson-Taylor. After the son's death in 1902 the holdings were divided and sold.

Small streams meet in the northeast corner of the parish to form a tributary of the Semington Brook. A water-powered corn mill was recorded here in 1449; in the 16th and 17th centuries the mill was used for fulling. Edge-tools were made here in the early 19th century, and later a flour mill and an iron mill were in operation. A three-storey 19th century mill building is still standing.

The Manor House, next to the church, dates from c. 1690 with enlargement and alteration in the 18th century. Southwest of the house is a Grade II* listed game larder and gazebo of similar date. Glebe House, a former farmhouse north of the church, is from the late 17th century and early 18th.

The Stert and Westbury Railway was built through the parish by the Great Western Railway Company in 1900, providing routes from London to Weymouth or Taunton. There was a station called Lavington, just beyond the east boundary of the parish, about one mile by road from Great Cheverell village. The line remains open but the station was closed in 1967 and no local stations remain; the nearest are Pewsey and Westbury.

To the south the parish extends onto higher ground at Cheverell Down, where the southernmost part has been part of the Imber Range military training area since 1933.

== Parish church ==
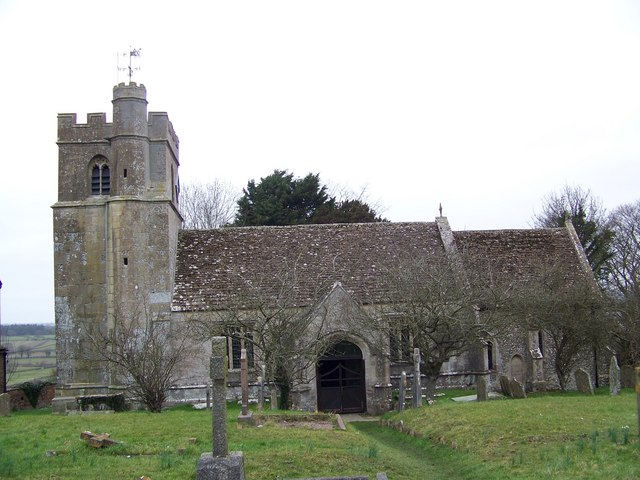
St Peter's Church

The Church of England parish church of St Peter is faced with limestone ashlar except for the oldest part, the chancel of malmstone and flint, which is probably from the 11th century. The nave and west tower are from the 14th century; in the 15th the south porch was added and the tower was raised, and gained an octagonal stair-tower. Restoration in 1868 by W.H. Woodman of Reading included re-roofing of the chancel, rebuilding of the chancel arch and addition of a north vestry. The octagonal font is 13th century.

The tower carries six bells: one of c. 1500 and three from the 18th century.

The church was designated as Grade I listed in 1962. Today the parish is part of the benefice of the Lavingtons, Cheverells & Easterton. The parish registers, now held at the Wiltshire and Swindon History Centre, cover the years 1653-1987 (baptisms), 1654-1994 (marriages), and 1654-1987 (burials).

== Chapels ==
A Baptist chapel was built on the High Street in 1837. Known as Little Zoar, it was used until 1907 when it became the Parish Room, continuing in the same role today as the Village Hall. A new chapel was built in red brick and stone in 1911, a short distance to the east; it was in use in 1973 but is now a private residence.

== Schools ==
Under the Will of J. Townsend, a charity school was established at Great Cheverell in 1725 which provided for six poor children of the parish to be taught reading and the principles of the Church of England, free of charge. By 1834, the school also had about another forty "pay-scholars", for whom a charge was made.

A new two-room school for 50-60 pupils was built in 1844 on a High Street plot provided by the rector, R. M. Atkinson, with assistance from the Townsend charity for running costs. This became a National School in 1845, a Board school in 1876 and a Church of England school in 1903. Attendance fell to 35 in 1955 but by 1973 had risen to 51.

A larger school, now called Holy Trinity CE Primary Academy, was opened on the south side of the village in 1980 to serve Great Cheverell and nearby parishes including Little Cheverell, Erlestoke and Coulston.

== Local government ==
Great Cheverell (or Cheverell Magna) is a civil parish with an elected parish council. It is in the area of the Wiltshire Council unitary authority, which is responsible for most significant local government functions.

== Amenities ==
There are playing fields with a modern pavilion, used for community functions. The village has a pub with accommodation, the Bell Inn, a late 18th-century building.

== Notable residents ==
- Jane Gregory (1959–2011), Olympic dressage rider
- Sir Charles Carter Chitham (1886–1972), policeman in British India
