= Milan Basta =

Yugoslav general and publicist (1921-2007)

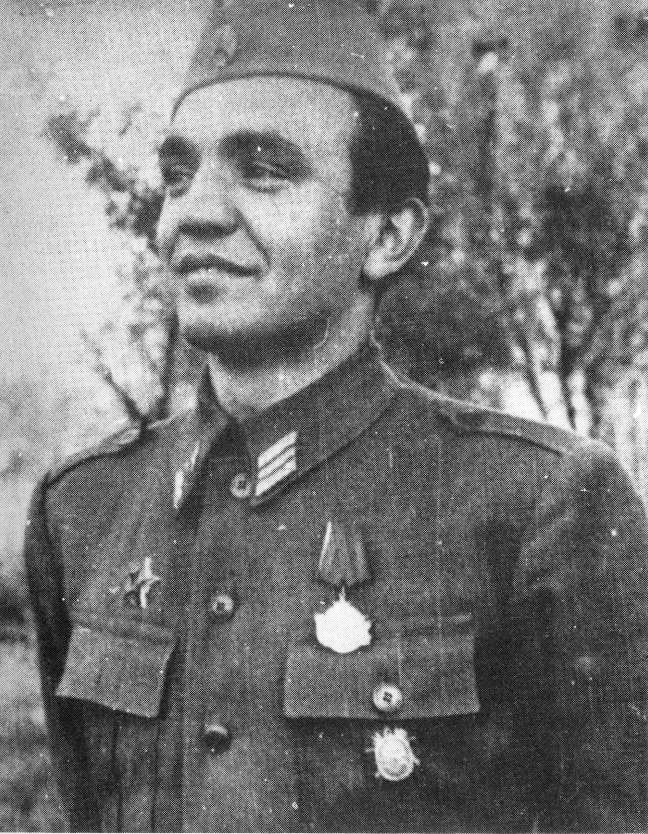
- Born: March 1, 1921; Kurjak, Korenica, Kingdom of Serbs, Croats, and Slovenes
- Died: December 4, 2007 (aged 86); Belgrade, Serbia
- Alma mater: Higher Military Academy of YNA
- Military career
- Allegiance: Yugoslavia
- Branch: Yugoslav People's Army
- Rank: Colonel, later General
- Commands: 51st Vojvodina Division
- Conflicts: World War II
- Awards

Milan Basta (1 March 1921 – 4 December 2007) was a Yugoslav World War II general, a member of the Partisan Movement and a publicist. Croatian Serb, he was born in 1921 in Kurjak, a village in Lika – a region in today's Croatia. He attended grammar school in Zagreb, Croatia where he joined the League of Communist Youth of Yugoslavia (SKOJ) in 1939. In 1941 he became a member of the Communist Party of Croatia. After joining the Yugoslav Partisans, he participated actively in the preparation of the uprising against the German occupier. During the liberation war in Yugoslavia he was appointed political commissar of the “Krbava” battalion, 2nd Lika Detachment and 3rd Lika Proletarian Brigade. He was the head of the political department of the 20th division and 12th Vojvodina Brigade. In 1945 he performed the duty of the political commissar of the 51st Vojvodina Division which took part in the battles at the Yugoslav-Austrian border.

At the end of World War II, namely 15 May 1945, general Basta pursued to Bleiburg, Austria the retreating Croatian Armed Forces of the Independent State of Croatia (NDH). Together with his partisan comrade Ivan Kovačić-Efenka, Basta took part in the negotiations in Bleiburg regarding the surrender of Croatian Armed Forces in which the representatives of the British army, led by Brigadier Patrick T.D. Scott of the 38th (Irish) Infantry Brigade, participated as the third party.

After the war, Basta graduated at the Higher Military Academy of the Yugoslav People's Army. He published several books about World War II. For his book Rat je završen 7 dana kasnije (The war ended 7 days later) in 1976, he was awarded “The 4th of July” prize. Milan Basta was also awarded several medals. He was a member of the Council of the Socialist Republic of Croatia (SR Hrvatska).

General Milan Basta was a compatriot and a close friend of Jovanka Broz, the wife of Yugoslav leader and president, Josip Broz Tito.

Milan Basta died on December 4, 2007, in Belgrade, aged 86.

== Bibliography ==
- Flego, Višnja (1983). "Basta, Milan". Croatian Biographical Lexicon (in Croatian). Miroslav Krleža Lexicographical Institute.
- Basta, Milan (1980). Rat je završen 7 dana kasnije (in Serbo-Croatian). Zagreb, Yugoslavia: Spektar.
- Tomasevich, Jozo (2001). War and Revolution in Yugoslavia: 1941 – 1945. Stanford, California: Stanford University Press.
- Besier, Gerhard; Stokłosa, Katarzyna (2013). European Dictatorships: A Comparative History of the Twentieth Century. Newcastle upon Tyne, UK: Cambridge Scholars Publishing.
- Sundhaussen, Holm (2014). Jugoslawien und seine Nachfolgestaaten 1943-2011: Eine ungewöhnliche Geschichte des Gewöhnlichen (in German). Vienna, Austria: Böhlau Verlag Wien. ISBN 978-3-205-79609-1.
- Booker, Christopher (1997). A Looking-Glass Tragedy: The Controversy Over the Repatriations From Austria in 1945. London, UK: Gerald Duckworth & Co Ltd. ISBN 9780715627389.
