= Ernest Blakelock Thubron =

French motorboat racer

Medal record

Men's motorboat racing

Representing France

Olympic Games
Gold medal – first place	1908 London	Open class

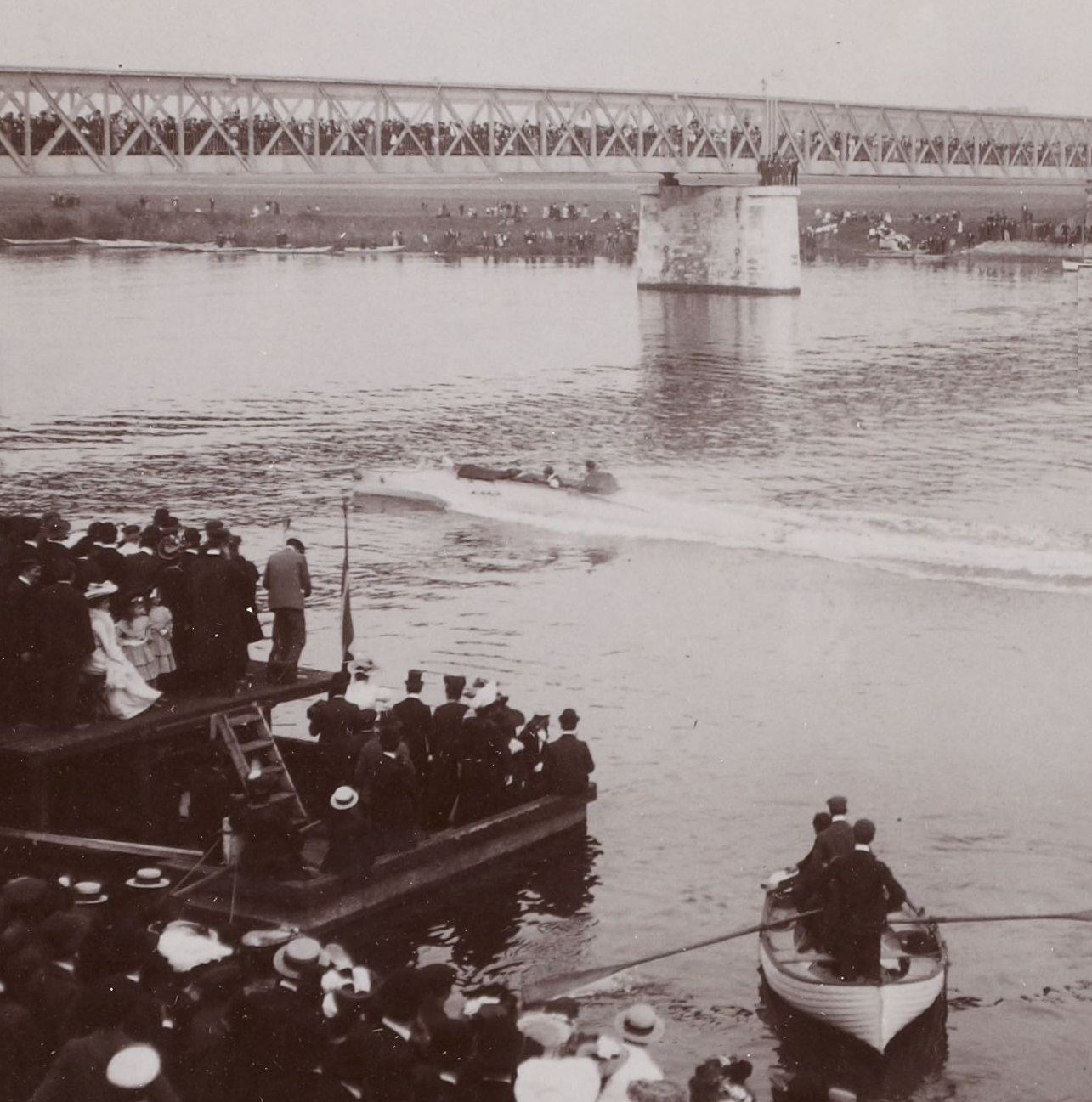
The Trèfle-à-Quatre powered by Brasier by Émile Thubron in 1904 (the motorboats in Juvisy) 1.jpg

Ernest Blakelock Thubron, also known as Émile Thubron (15 July 1861) was an Anglo-French motorboat racer and an Olympic champion. He was born in The Boldons, United Kingdom. He died in Tokomaru, New Zealand on 22 May 1927

He won the second running of the Harmsworth Trophy for motor powered boats in 1904 in Trefle-à-quatre. In 1898, Thubron was a Managing Owner of Boulac Engine Works, Cairo and in 1906 he was still working as a boat constructor in Egypt.

He competed with his boat Camille in Class A (the open class) at the 1908 Summer Olympics in London, where he won a gold medal. He finished the forty nautical miles in 2:26:53, and Camille was the only boat to finish that race.

He retired in New Zealand. His son was a Brigadier by the name Gerald Thubron OBE and his grandson Colin Thubron, a writer.
