= Charles Carter Chitham =

Sir Charles Carter Chitham CIE JP (13 September 1886 – 25 September 1972) was a British policeman who served most of his career in British India.

== Early life ==
Chitham was born in Market Bosworth, Leicestershire, the son of Samuel Chitham by his marriage in 1877 at Longthorpe to Elizabeth Hannah Carter, the eldest daughter of George Carter, of Milton. Carter, who died in 1889, was huntsman to the Fitzwilliam Hunt. Chitham had two older sisters, Isabel (1878–1963) and Clara (1880–1962). By 1887 Samuel Chitham was the school attendance officer for Bosworth, and in 1907 and 1911 he was vaccination officer in Bedford. Chitham was educated at Bedford School.

== Career ==
In 1906 Chitham joined the Indian Police, and by December 1912 he was an Officer of the Central Provinces Police at Nagpur. By 1915 he was an Assistant Superintendent of Police in the Central Provinces, and in April 1915 was posted to Port Blair as 3rd Assistant Superintendent in the Andaman and Nicobar Police. In 1926 Chitham was promoted from District Police Superintendent to Deputy Inspector-General of Police, Crime, and Railways, in the Central Provinces. In 1931 he was appointed as Inspector-General of Police for the Central Provinces, was knighted in 1936, and was Federal Public Service Commissioner at Delhi in 1937 and 1939. Returning to Britain, he served as Acting Inspector of Constabulary for the South West Region of England from 1940 to 1945.

Chitham's mother died at home, 89, Beverley Crescent, Bedford, in March 1931, and his father, Samuel Chitham, died there in May 1932.

In England Chitham settled at the Old Rectory, Great Cheverell, Wiltshire, a house he and his uncle Frank L. Carter had bought about 1939. In 1945 he became a Justice of the Peace and was also elected to Wiltshire County Council and appointed as a governor of Dauntsey's School. On 6 July 1961, as chairman of the Wiltshire Standing Committee, he laid the foundation stone of the new Wiltshire Police headquarters at Devizes.

Chitham's older sister, Isabel, died unmarried while living with him in Wiltshire in 1963. Chitham died in 1972. A small housing development at Great Cheverell is named "Chitham Close" in his memory.

== Honours ==
- King's Police Medal (KPM), 1931
- Companion of the Order of the Indian Empire (CIE), 1934
- Knight Bachelor (Kt), New Year Honours, 1936, investiture by Viceroy of India 16 April 1937
