= Roderic Petre =

British Army general (1887–1971)

Major-General Roderic Petre CB DSO MC
- Born: 28 November 1887; Indore, British India
- Died: 21 July 1971 (aged 83)
- Relatives: Francis Loraine Petre (father)
- Military career
- Allegiance: United Kingdom
- Branch: British Army
- Service years: 1908–1944
- Rank: Major-General
- Service number: 4150
- Units: South Wales Borderers; Dorsetshire Regiment
- Commands: South Midlands District (1942–44); Durham & North Riding Coastal Area (1941–42); 48th (South Midland) Infantry Division (1940–41); 12th (Eastern) Infantry Division (1939–40); Senior Officers' School, Sheerness (1938–39); 2nd Battalion, Dorset Regiment (1932–35)
- Conflicts: First World War; Second World War
- Awards: Companion of the Order of the Bath; Distinguished Service Order; Military Cross; Mentioned in Despatches (7)

Major-General Roderic Loraine Petre, CB, DSO, MC (28 November 1887 – 21 July 1971) was a senior British Army officer.

== Military career ==
Born the son of Francis Loraine Petre and Maud Ellen Rawlinson, Petre attended Downside School near Midsomer Norton and Stratton-on-the-Fosse, where he sang treble in the boys choir. After graduating from the Royal Military College at Sandhurst, he was commissioned into the South Wales Borderers of the British Army in February 1908.

He served with his regiment, initially in China, and later in the Gallipoli campaign of the First World War, and was awarded the Military Cross in 1916. He was also appointed a companion of the Distinguished Service Order in 1917 for his service in Mesopotamia. He was also mentioned in dispatches seven times throughout the war.

He served in Afghanistan in 1919 and, after marrying in 1922, he returned to England where he attended the Staff College at Camberley from 1923 to 1924. This was followed by three years at the War Office in London as a staff officer. He was promoted to major on 12 April 1928 and brevet lieutenant colonel on 1 January 1929.

Upon transferring to the Dorset Regiment in 1929 and became commanding officer (CO) of the regiment's 2nd Battalion in 1932. After commanding the battalion until 1935, and after being promoted to colonel on 16 March 1935, with seniority backdated to 1 January 1933, he served as a staff officer with the Sudan Defence Force until 1938.

He went on to be Commandant of the Senior Officers' School, Sheerness in May 1938 and then was promoted to major general, just as Second World War was beginning, on 25 August 1939, with seniority backdated to 26 June 1938.

He was soon made general officer commanding (GOC) 12th (Eastern) Infantry Division, a newly raised Territorial Army (TA) formation. In April 1940 the division landed in France and in May he took command of 'Petreforce', a grouping of the 12th Division, the 23rd (Northumbrian) Division, and other nearby units formed to defend allied positions near Arras. In the fighting the "12th and 23rd Divisions ... had practically ceased to exist" as a result of the fighting that saw the "whole tract of country between the Scarpe and the Somme" fall into German hands.

After being evacuated through Dunkirk, Petre then became GOC of the 48th (South Midland) Division in June 1940 and initiated training to repel Operation Sea Lion, the German invasion of England, which proved abortive, remaining in that role until October 1941. He served briefly as GOC of IX Corps before being made commander of South Midland District before his retirement from the army in 1944.

== Bibliography ==
- Smart, Nick (2005). Biographical Dictionary of British Generals of the Second World War. Barnsley, South Yorkshire: Pen and Sword Books. ISBN 1844150496.

Military offices
Preceded by Robert Pollok	Commandant of the Senior Officers' School, Sheerness; 1938–1939	Succeeded by Robert Money
Preceded by Andrew Thorne	GOC 48th (South Midland) Infantry Division; 1940–1941	Succeeded by Edward Grasett
