= Great Cheverell Hill =

Protected area in Wiltshire, England

Coordinates: 51.26714°N 2.05012°W

Great Cheverell Hill (grid reference ST966520) is a 33.2 hectare biological Site of Special Scientific Interest at Great Cheverell in Wiltshire, notified in 1971.

The site consists of unimproved species-rich chalk grassland on the edge of Salisbury Plain, parts of it with over forty plant species per square metre, and supports some uncommon butterflies. Its slopes of the Lower Chalk mostly face south-west, and there are two combes. The sward is notable for upright brome (Bromus erectus) and sheep's fescue (Festuca ovina). Other plants include quaking grass, crested hair-grass, Bird's-foot-trefoil, dwarf thistle, small scabious (Scabiosa columbaria) and hoary plantain (Plantago media).

All of the land within the site designated as Great Cheverell Hill SSSI is owned by the Ministry of Defence.

== Sources ==
- Natural England citation sheet for the site (accessed 1 April 2022)
