= Fletching, East Sussex =

Village in East Sussex, England

Coordinates: 50.99°N 0.03°E

Fletching
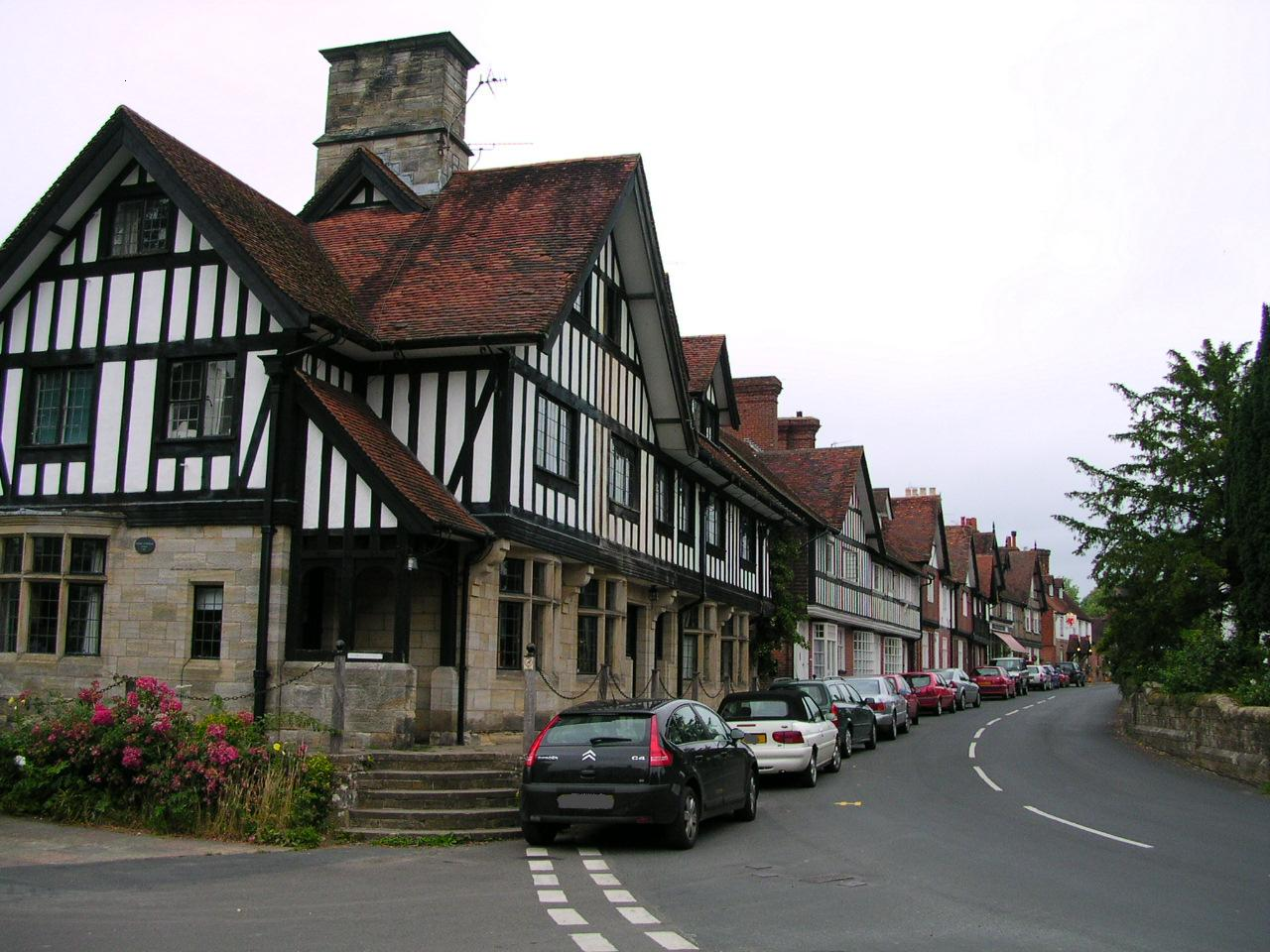
- Fletching in 2008

- Location within East Sussex
- Area: 25.7 km^{2} (9.9 sq mi)
- Population: 1,064 (2011)
  - Density: 105/sq mi (41/km^{2})
- OS grid reference: TQ428234
  - London: 36 miles (58 km) N
- Civil parish: Fletching
- District: Wealden
- Shire county: East Sussex
- Region: South East
- Country: England
- Sovereign state: United Kingdom
- Post town: UCKFIELD
- Postcode district: TN22
- Dialling code: 01825
- Police: Sussex
- Fire: East Sussex
- Ambulance: South East Coast
- UK Parliament: Wealden

Fletching is a village and civil parish in the Wealden District of East Sussex, England. It is located three miles (4.8 km) to the north-west of Uckfield, near one of the entrances to Sheffield Park. The A272 road crosses the parish. The settlement of Piltdown is part of the parish. The Piltdown Man discovery in 1912 was thought to be the missing link between humans and apes. The significance of the specimen remained controversial until, amidst great publicity, and much embarrassment in scientific circles, it was exposed in 1953 as a forgery thought to have been committed by Charles Dawson.

The village is listed in the Domesday Book of 1086 as Flescinge, an Old English name meaning "(settlement of) the family or followers of a man called Flecci." Despite this, the name has given rise to a belief that the village was a medieval centre for arrow production.

The hamlet of Sharpsbridge lies in the south of the parish.

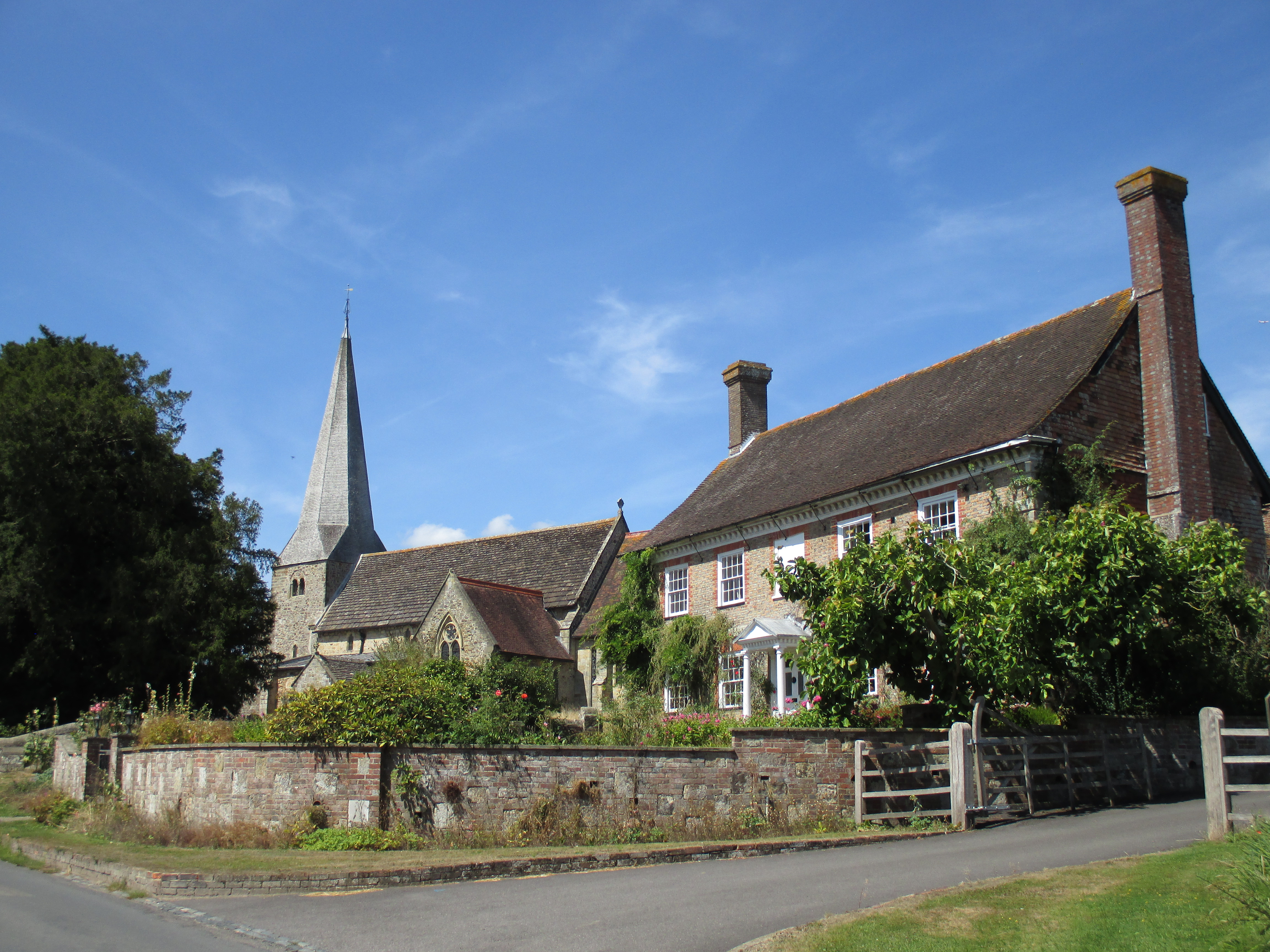
Church of St. Andrew and St. Mary the Virgin, with Church Farm House

It has an historic church of St Andrew and St Mary the Virgin dating from the twelfth century. Simon de Montfort prayed there before the Battle of Lewes. Historian Edward Gibbon (1737–1794) is interred in the Sheffield Mausoleum attached to the north transept of the church, having died in Fletching while staying with his great friend, John Baker-Holroyd, 1st Earl of Sheffield.

The school is Fletching CofE Primary school. There are two public houses in Fletching:The Griffin Inn (which calls itself a gastropub) and The Rose and Crown. Nearby is The Piltdown Man at Piltdown. There is a Florist Café: Bay & Bellflower

The village was once the home of the comedian Jimmy Edwards (1920–1988).

Fletching is home to Fletching Football Club, also known as The Archers. Fletching 1st team play in the Mid-Sussex Football League division 2 - South, with the 2nd team playing in Division 5 - South.
