= Winchester Clowes =

British motorboat racer

Personal information
- Born: 4 October 1876; Surbiton, England
- Died: 25 February 1940 (aged 63); Framlingham, England

Sport
- Sport: Motorboat racing

Winchester Clowes (4 October 1876 – 25 February 1940) was a British motorboat racer who competed in the Class A event at the 1908 Summer Olympics.
