= Pat Scott (British Army officer) =

British Army general (1905–1976)

Major-General Pat Scott CB CBE DSO & Bar
- Born: 1 March 1905; Punjab Province (British India)
- Died: 30 July 1976 (aged 71)
- Military career
- Allegiance: United Kingdom
- Branch: British Army
- Service years: 1924–1959
- Rank: Major-General
- Service number: 30926
- Unit: Royal Irish Fusiliers
- Commands: 1st Battalion, Royal Irish Fusiliers; 2nd Battalion, London Irish Rifles; 12th Infantry Brigade; 128th Infantry Brigade; 38th Infantry Brigade; Senior Officers' School, Sheerness; 107th (Ulster) Brigade; 42nd (Lancashire) Division
- Conflicts: Second World War
- Awards: Companion of the Order of the Bath; Commander of the Order of the British Empire; Distinguished Service Order & Bar

Major-General Thomas Patrick David Scott, CB, CBE, DSO & Bar (1 March 1905 – 30 July 1976) was a senior British Army officer.

== Military career ==
Scott was born in Punjab Province (British India) on 1 March 1905, the son of Thomas Edwin Scott, who was an officer in the British Indian Army. Scott was sent to England where he was educated at Blundell's School before he entered the Royal Military College, Sandhurst, from where he was commissioned as a second lieutenant into the Royal Irish Fusiliers on 30 August 1924, alongside Kendal Chavasse.

The outbreak of the Second World War found Scott as a student at the Staff College, Camberley, with Chavasse as one of his fellow students. He briefly became brigade major of the 147th Infantry Brigade. He became commanding officer of the 1st Battalion, Royal Irish Fusiliers in Tunisia in 1942 and went on to be commander of 12th Brigade in North Africa in July 1943, commander of 128th Brigade in Italy in November 1943 and finally commander of 38th Infantry Brigade in Italy in February 1944. As the Commanding Officer of 38th (Irish) Brigade he was the British representative at the negotiations with Milan Basta, a political commissar of the Yugoslav National Army, on 15 May 1945 that led to the surrender of Croatian armed forces and civilians prior to the Bleiburg repatriations.

His service in the war was recognised with his appointment as Commander of the Order of the British Empire. He was also appointed a companion of the Distinguished Service Order with bar.

After the war he became commandant of the Senior Officers' School, Sheerness in 1948, commander of 107th (Ulster) Brigade in 1950 and Deputy Adjutant-General Middle East Land Forces in 1952. He went on to be training advisor to the Pakistan Army in 1954 and General Officer Commanding 42nd (Lancashire) Division in 1956. He was appointed a Companion of the Order of the Bath in the 1956 Birthday Honours before retiring in 1959.

Scott served as colonel of The Royal Irish Fusiliers from 1960 to 1968 and as Lord Lieutenant of County Fermanagh from 1971 to 1976.

Military offices
Preceded by Gerald Thubron	Commandant of the Senior Officers' School, Sheerness; 1948−1950	Succeeded by John Spurling
Preceded by William Stratton	GOC 42nd (Lancashire) Division; 1956−1959	Succeeded by Claude Dunbar
