= Water motorsports at the 1908 Summer Olympics – Class A =

Class A (open) motorboating at the Games of the IV Olympiad
- Venue: Southampton Water
- Dates: August 28–29
- Competitors: 7 from 2 nations

Medalists
1st place, gold medalist(s)		Camille	France

The Class A (open class) was one of three motorboating classes contested on the Water motorsports at the 1908 Summer Olympics programme. Nations could enter up to 3 boats.

The open class was scheduled to take place on the first day of competition, 28 August. The race was a 40 nautical miles long. Two boats, Wolseley-Siddely and Dylan, began the race. Dylan abandoned the race partway through the first lap, with Wolseley-Siddely finishing the first before the weather became too severe to continue the race.

A second attempt to run the event took place the next day, after the other two races had been completed. Wolseley-Siddely again started, this time against Camille (the only French boat to take part in competition). Wolseley-Siddely ran aground on a mud spit, leaving Camille to finish alone for the gold medal.

== Results ==
Place	Boat	Boaters	Nation	Time
1st place, gold medalist(s)	Camille	Emile Thubron	France	2:26:53 (h:mm:ss)
–	Dylan	Alfred Fentiman; Thomas Scott-Ellis	Great Britain	Did not finish
–	Wolseley-Siddely	Winchester Clowes; Hugh Grosvenor; Joseph Frederick Laycock (first race); G. H. Atkinson (second race)	Great Britain	Did not finish

== See also ==
- Cook, Theodore Andrea (1908). The Fourth Olympiad, Being the Official Report. London: British Olympic Association.
- De Wael, Herman (2001). "Motorboating 1908". Herman's Full Olympians. Archived from the original on 3 March 2016.
- OlyMADMen. "Motorboating at the 1908 London Summer Games: Mixed B-Class". Sports-Reference. Archived from the original on 18 April 2020.
