= Kendal Chavasse =

British Army officer (1904–2001)

- Born: 28 September 1904; County Waterford, Ireland
- Died: 31 March 2001 (aged 96)
- Military career
- Allegiance: United Kingdom
- Branch: British Army
- Service years: 1924–1947
- Rank: Colonel
- Service number: 30822
- Units: Royal Irish Fusiliers; Reconnaissance Corps
- Commands: 56th Reconnaissance Regiment, Reconnaissance Corps; Battalion, Royal Irish Fusiliers
- Conflicts: Arab revolt in Palestine; World War II
- Awards: Distinguished Service Order

Colonel Kendal George Fleming Chavasse, DSO and bar (28 September 1904 − 31 March 2001, in County Waterford, Ireland), was an Irish-born British Army officer who saw service in World War II.

== Early life and military career ==
Kendal Chavasse was born in Waterford, Ireland, on 28 September 1904. He was the third son (with four brothers) of Major Henry Chavasse (1863–1943) and his second wife Judith Isabella Fleming (1867–1935). Two of his brothers served (with distinction) in the Royal Navy (Commander Evelyn Henry Chavasse DSO DSC and Captain Paul Chavasse CBE DSC and Bar). He married Oonah Perceval-Maxwell in 1930; the couple had a son and a daughter. Chavasse was also intended to join the Royal Navy and to that end he was educated at the Royal Naval College, Osborne, and the Royal Naval College, Dartmouth. However, illness prevented his timely start as a naval cadet until he was too old to do so, but, through family contacts, he was accepted into the Royal Military College, Sandhurst, where he graduated, alongside Thomas "Pat" Scott, on 30 August 1924 as a second lieutenant in the Royal Irish Fusiliers (Princess Victoria's).

His first years of military service during the interwar period consisted largely of regimental duties, serving with his regiment in Egypt, India, the Sudan and the United Kingdom. Among his fellow officers in the battalion, in addition to "Pat" Scott from Sandhurst days, was Gerald Templer. Chavasse was promoted to lieutenant on 30 August 1926, and, due to the slow rate of promotion in peacetime, was only promoted to captain on 3 October 1935. In May 1937, he was posted to the 2nd Battalion, Royal Irish Fusiliers, then serving in Malta, and was appointed Adjutant, and he later served in Palestine during the Arab revolt. In January 1939, Chavasse returned to the United Kingdom where he attended the Staff College, Camberley, where Scott was among his fellow students.

== Second World War ==
He had wartime service as Commanding Officer of 56th Reconnaissance Regiment (nicknamed "Chavasse's Light Horse"). 56 Recce fought in Tunisia as part of 78th Division and between 25 November and 10 December 1942 it operated east of Oued Med Jerga. Despite being outnumbered and outgunned and without effective air protection, 56 Recce dominated its area. This was attributed to Chavasse's "personal example, dash and daring" and consequently he was awarded his first Distinguished Service Order.

56 Recce stayed with 78th Division during the Italian campaign and at Termoli on 5 October, Chavasse led a mixed force consisting of part of his regiment, 3 Commando, a troop of the Special Raiding Squadron and an anti-tank battery; this force held an exposed position under heavy attack. Superior forces were held off during the day and, when ordered to withdraw, Chavasse extracted his force almost entirely. Once again, much was attributed to his leadership and he was awarded a Bar to his DSO, the citation praised his "exceptional leadership, coolness and devotion to duty" and stated that "his personal example was the mainspring of a gallant and effective defence which did much to ensure the successful outcome of the operations".

As a temporary Colonel, he served briefly with 5th Army as British Deputy Chief of Staff and then returned to England to run the Reconnaissance Training Centre at Catterick. From March 1946, he served as GSOI with 6th Armoured Division at Padua. He commanded the Royal Irish Fusiliers' 2nd Battalion in December, a role he continued in Egypt and Palestine until his retirement in 1947.

== Retirement ==
Chavasse retired to a new family home, a farm in County Waterford. Once again, he displayed customary enthusiasm and action, and became an innovative farmer, pioneering methods new to his area. He was a founder member of the Irish Farmers' Association and a prominent participant in local activities such as the West Waterford Hunt and the Dungarvan Show.

He was a devout Christian and became the longest-serving lay reader in Ireland, assisting with services, including the annual Armistice Day service, throughout the diocese. He also represented his diocese at the 1963 World Anglican Conference in Toronto. He was a member of the Diocesan Council and the General Synod of the Church of Ireland.

== Awards and decorations ==
- Distinguished Service Order (11 February 1943) and bar (10 February 1944)
- Mentioned in Despatches (22 December 1940)
- Officer of the Legion of Merit (United States, 15 August 1946)
