= James Renton =

British Army general (1898–1972)

Major-General James Renton CB DSO* OBE
- Born: 18 March 1898; Mayfair, London, England
- Died: 11 January 1972 (aged 73); Horsham, West Sussex, England
- Military career
- Allegiance: United Kingdom
- Branch: British Army
- Service years: 1916–1948
- Rank: Major-General
- Nickname: "Wingy""Cal"
- Service number: 10795
- Unit: Rifle Brigade (The Prince Consort's Own)
- Commands: British Advisory Military Mission to Iraq (1944–1948); Senior Officers' School, Sheerness (1943–1944); 199th Infantry Brigade (1943); 7th Armoured Division (1942–1943); 7th Motor Brigade (1942); 2nd Battalion, Rifle Brigade (The Prince Consort's Own) (1940–1941)
- Conflicts: First World War; Second World War
- Awards: Companion of the Order of the Bath; Distinguished Service Order & Bar; Officer of the Order of the British Empire; Mentioned in Despatches; Order of the Two Rivers, 2nd Class (Iraq)

Major-General James Malcolm Leslie Renton, CB, DSO & Bar, OBE (18 March 1898 – 11 January 1972) was a senior British Army officer who briefly commanded the 7th Armoured Division ("The Desert Rats") during the Second World War.

== Military career ==
After being educated at Eton and the Royal Military College, Sandhurst, Renton was commissioned into the Rifle Brigade in 1916 and served in the First World War.

Renton was appointed Deputy Assistant Adjutant General for the Iraq Levies in 1922. He also served in the Second World War as commanding officer of 2nd Battalion the Rifle Brigade from 1940 (leading it and losing an arm at the Battle of Sidi Saleh in 1941) and as commander of the Support Group of the 7th Motor Brigade from 1942 (leading it at the Battle of Gazala). He was appointed General Officer Commanding 7th Armoured Division later that year. He went on to serve at the Senior Officers' School from 1943 before becoming Head of the British Military Mission and Inspector General of the Iraqi Army in 1944 and retiring in 1948.

== Bibliography ==
- Smart, Nick (2005). Biographical Dictionary of British Generals of the Second World War. Barnsley, South Yorkshire: Pen and Sword Books. ISBN 1844150496.

Military offices
Preceded by Frank Messervy	GOC 7th Armoured Division; June–September 1942	Succeeded by John Harding
Preceded by Stanley Oswald Jones	Commandant of the Senior Officers' School, Sheerness; 1943–1944	Succeeded by Gerald Thubron
