= Erlestoke =

Village in Wiltshire, England

Coordinates: 51.284°N 2.053°W

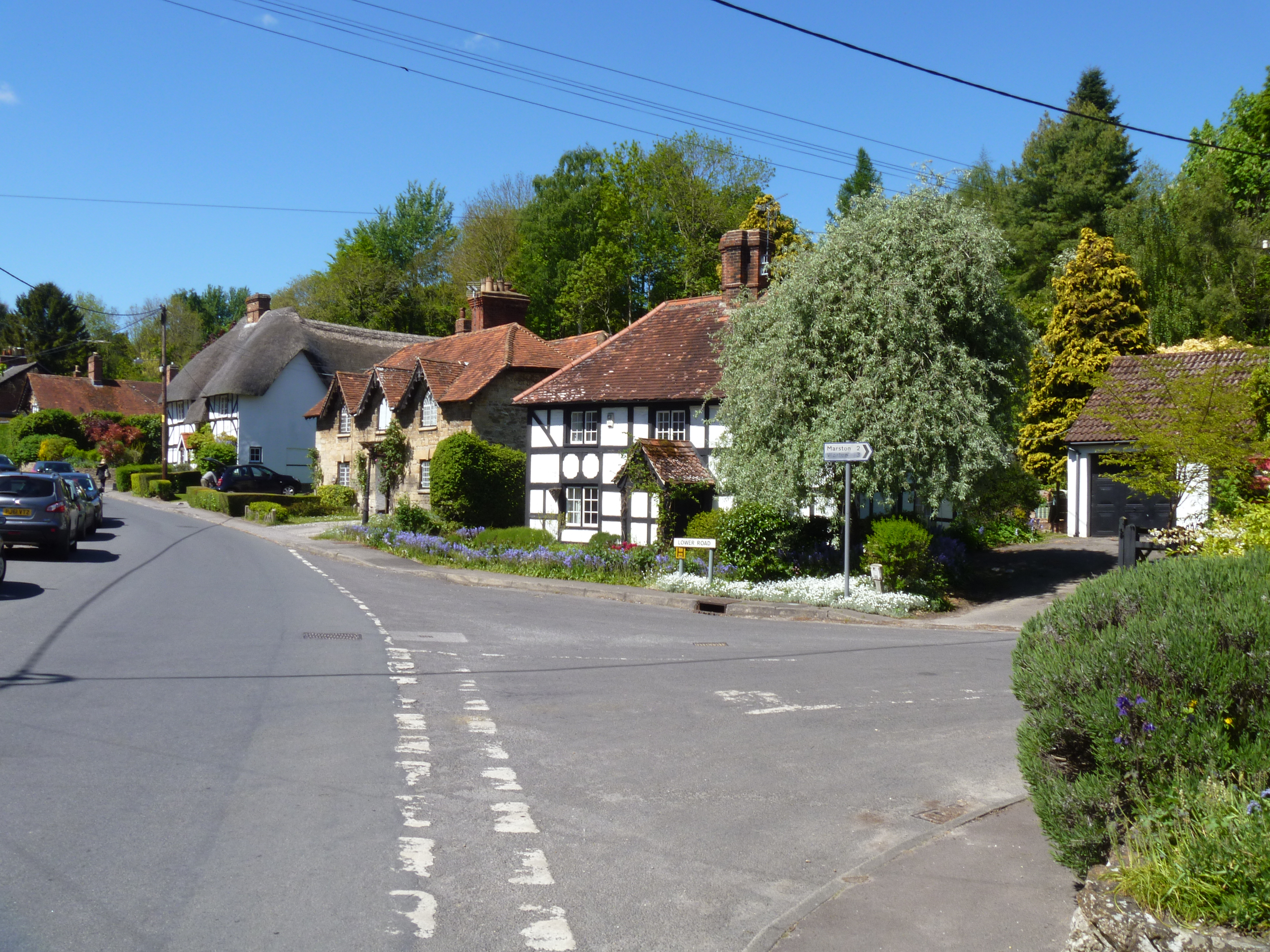
- High Street, Erlestoke

- Location within Wiltshire
- Population: 210 (in 2011)
- OS grid reference: ST964539
- Civil parish: Erlestoke
- Unitary authority: Wiltshire
- Ceremonial county: Wiltshire
- Region: South West
- Country: England
- Sovereign state: United Kingdom
- Post town: Devizes
- Postcode district: SN10
- Dialling code: 01380
- Police: Wiltshire
- Fire: Dorset and Wiltshire
- Ambulance: South Western
- UK Parliament: Melksham and Devizes
- Website: Parish Council

Erlestoke is a village and civil parish in Wiltshire, England, on the northern edge of Salisbury Plain. The village lies about 6 miles (10 km) east of Westbury and the same distance south-west of Devizes.

Erlestoke Prison, the only prison in Wiltshire, is within the parish.

== History ==
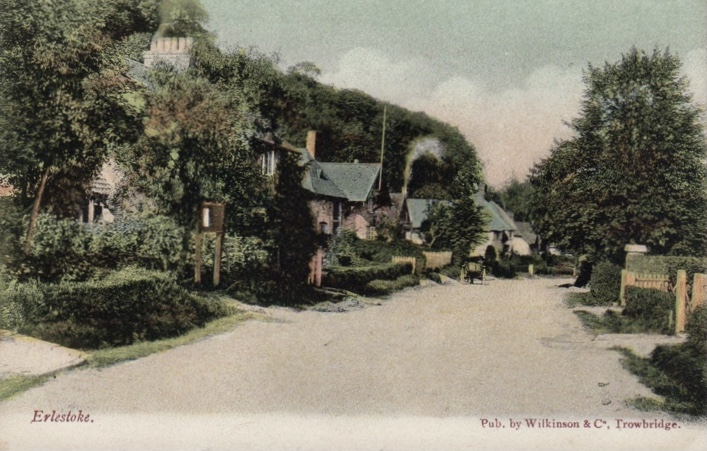
Erlestoke c. 1901

The ancient parish of Erlestoke was a chapelry of Melksham. The Crown was lord of the manor of Erlestoke; the first recorded grant of land was by Henry I in the 12th century. From the 16th until the early 18th the Brouncker family held land at Erlestoke, including Henry Brouncker, a Member of Parliament in the 16th and early 17th. Later owners included Peter Delmé, an 18th-century MP; Joshua Smith (1732–1819), MP for Devizes; and George Watson-Taylor (1771–1841), also MP for Devizes. The Watson-Taylors built up large estates at Erlestoke, Coulston (including Baynton House), Great Cheverell and Edington until they were divided and sold between 1907 and 1910, following the death in 1902 of Simon Watson Taylor; Erlestoke Park remained in the family until it was sold in 1919.

The current form of the village is largely due to Joshua Smith, who between the 1780s and the 1810s was responsible for replacing the Elizabethan manor house with one higher up the hill east of the village, designed by George Steuart. The new house was at first called Stoke Park, and later Erlestoke Park and Erlestoke House. Smith landscaped the park which surrounds the village on three sides, adding a lake, and moving the houses of the village to the current High Street. Newly built estate cottages incorporated pieces of sculpture and architectural fragments from the earlier manor house; an example is Tilted Lodge, c. 1800.

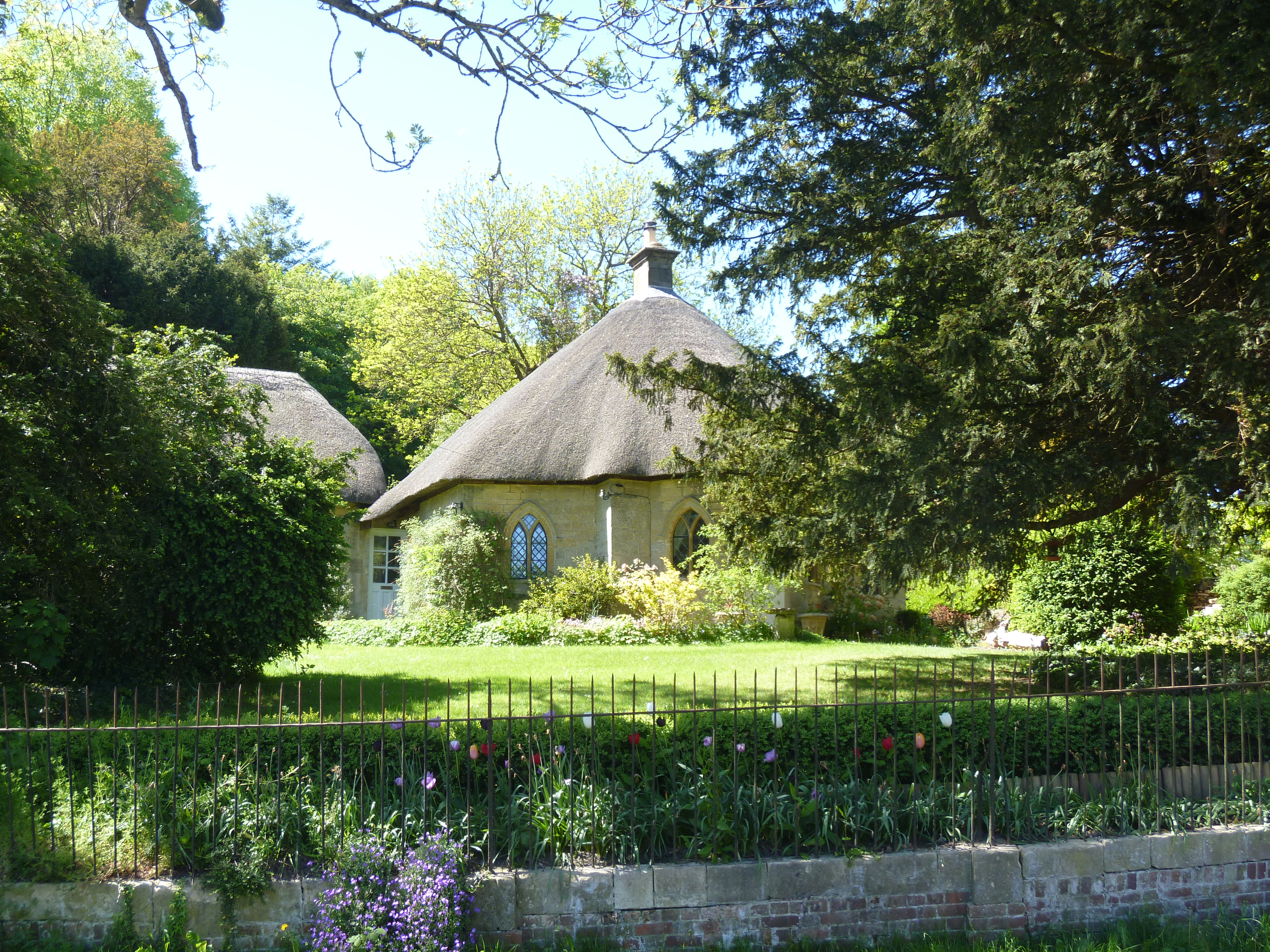
Tilted Lodge

By 1859 there was a school in a building owned by the Watson-Taylors, which formerly served as the laundry for the Erlestoke Park estate. The building was extended in 1893 and came into Church ownership in 1920; children of all ages attended until 1935, when older children were transferred elsewhere. The school closed in 1980 following the building of a new primary school at Great Cheverell.

The Church of the Holy Saviour was built next to the gates of Erlestoke Park in 1880 by G.E. Street for Lady Hannah Watson-Taylor (1818–1887), wife of Simon Watson Taylor. The building has fragments of an earlier church dedicated to St James, possibly from the 12th century; the 16th-century pulpit and five 17th-century bells are also from the earlier church. 18th-century tombs remain in the disused churchyard of the former church, some 150 metres to the northeast.

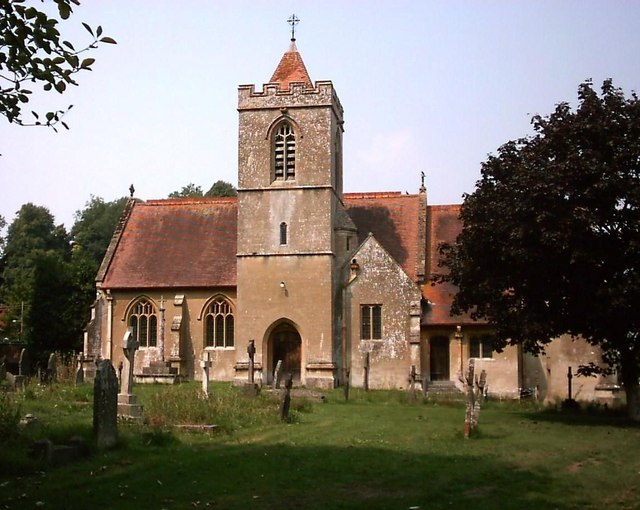
St Saviour's Church

=== 20th century ===
The Stert and Westbury Railway was built through the parish by the Great Western Railway Company in 1900, providing routes from London to Weymouth or Taunton. There was a station at Lavington, 2 miles (3.2 km) from Erlestoke by road. It was closed in 1967 and no local stations remain; the nearest railway stations are Pewsey and Westbury.

In the 1930s, the War Office purchased 1,235 acres (500 ha) of land in the parish, for accommodation for personnel undergoing training in the area. The Ordnance Survey 1:25,000 map of 1958 shows many small buildings south of the road, opposite Erlestoke House; although the access tracks remain, the buildings are no longer standing.

The Army's Senior Officer's School moved into Erlestoke House in 1939, and continued in the wings after the central part was seriously damaged by a fire in 1950. Since 1960 the site has been occupied by prison establishments which became HM Prison Erlestoke, with several additional buildings constructed around the house.

== Local government ==
Erlestoke has an elected parish council. It is in the area of the Wiltshire Council unitary authority, which is responsible for most significant local government functions.

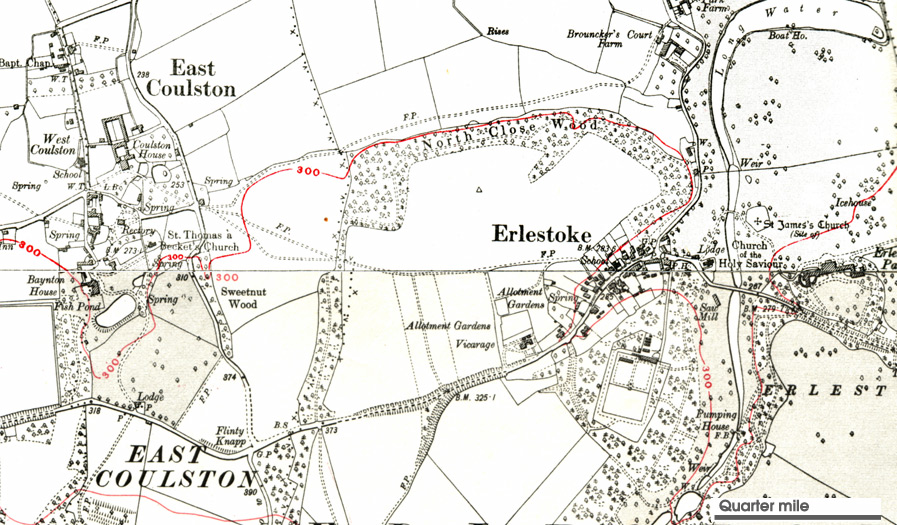
Map of the village, 1922

== Amenities ==
The church is now part of the benefice of Bratton, Edington and Imber, Erlestoke, and Coulston.

The Wessex Ridgeway long-distance footpath crosses Stoke Hill in the south of the parish.

A former walled kitchen garden has been the home of Erlestoke and Coulston Cricket Club since 1991. Erlestoke golf course opened in 1992, west of the village. There was a pub, the George and Dragon, in a 17th-century building; it closed in April 2015.

== People ==
Brian Jones, a balloonist who completed the first non-stop flight around the world in 1999, lived in the village around that time. The composer Peter Seabourne lived at Brouncker's Court Farm in Erlestoke from 1961 to 1989, studying at Clare College, Cambridge (1980–83) with Robin Holloway. The composer Anthony Scott (pupil of Gerald Finzi and Ralph Vaughan Williams) also lived in the village in the late 1980s, as did the comedians Lenny Henry and Dawn French.

== Sources ==
- Map 'Explorer 143', published by the Ordnance Survey, ISBN 0-319-23557-2, revised 2004.
