= Alfred Fentiman =

British motorboat racer

Personal information
- Born: 4 October 1867; Lewisham, England
- Died: 27 July 1943 (aged 75); Isleworth, England

Sport
- Sport: Motorboat racing

Alfred Fentiman (4 October 1867 – 27 July 1943) was a British sportsman who competed in cycling as well as a range of early motorized sports. As a motorboat racer he competed in the Class A event at the 1908 Summer Olympics.
