= Senior Officers' School =

Coordinates: 51.2838°N 2.0447°W

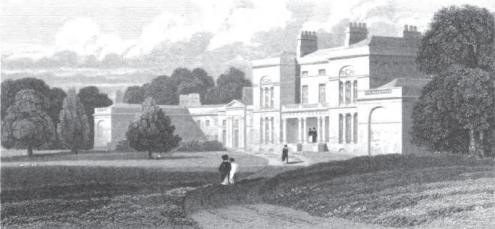
- Senior Officers' School at Earlstoke Park House (destroyed by fire in 1950)
- Active: 1916–1961
- Country: United Kingdom
- Branch: British Army
- Type: Training
- Role: Senior Army Officer Training
- Garrison/HQ: Erlestoke Park, Wiltshire, England

The Senior Officers' School was a British military establishment formed in 1916 by Brigadier-General R. J. Kentish for the training of Commonwealth senior officers of all services in inter-service cooperation. It was created as part of a wider attempt by the British Army to create a coherent training plan for its officers. At first at Aldershot, the school was at Erlestoke, Wiltshire, from 1939 until its closure in 1961.

== History ==
The school was originally intended for senior officers of the British Army who aspired to battalion command. It was taken as an affront by some senior officers of the day, who resented the implication—true in some cases—that they were incapable of delivering the necessary training. The school attempted to widen officers' outlook by including in its syllabus subjects that were not immediately military but led to an appreciation of the wider political, geographical and technological environment in which the British Army would operate.

The School was based at Aldershot until the 1920s, when it transferred to Sheerness, Kent. In 1939 it moved to Erlestoke Park, a country house at Erlestoke, Wiltshire, where it continued to operate until June 1950 when a major fire caused it to move to the wings of the house; the school closed completely in 1961. The site was then converted into a detention centre for young offenders, and is now HM Prison Erlestoke.

There was also a parallel establishment, the Senior Officers' School, Belgaum, at Belgaum in India.

== Notable alumni ==
- John Alan Lyde Caunter, Brigadier, British Army
- Andrew Cunningham, Admiral of the Fleet, Royal Navy
- Kenneth Leask, Air Vice-Marshal, Royal Air Force
- John Northcott, Lieutenant General, Australian Army
- Evered Poole, Major General, South African Army
- Anton Muttukumaru, Major General, Ceylon Army
- Edmond Schreiber, Lieutenant-General
- John Tovey, Admiral of the Fleet, Royal Navy
- John Tyssen, Air Commodore, Royal Air Force
- John Vereker, Field Marshal, British Army
- Douglas Wimberley, Major General, British Army
- Robert Nimmo, Lieutenant General, Australian Army

== Commandants ==
The following officers commanded the school:

- Brigadier-General Charles E. Corkran: September 1919 – November 1921
- Brigadier-General Barnett D.L.G. Anley: November 1921 – November 1925
- Major-General Spencer E. Hollond: November 1925 – September 1927
- Brigadier Bertie D. Fisher: September 1927 – March 1930
- Major-General Andrew J. McCulloch: March 1930 – September 1933
- Brigadier Wilfred G. Lindsell: September 1933 – May 1935
- Brigadier Robert V. Pollok: May 1935 – May 1938
- Brigadier Roderic L. Petre: May 1938 – August 1939
- Brigadier Robert C. Money: August 1939 – June 1940
- Brigadier William Robb; June 1940 – March 1941
- Brigadier Piers D.W. Dunn: March – November 1941
- Brigadier D. Charles Bullen-Smith: November 1941 – May 1942
- Brigadier Stanley O. Jones: May 1942 – September 1943
- Brigadier James M.L. Renton: September 1943 – 1944
- (school closed 1944–1945)
- Brigadier Gerald E. Thubron: November 1945 – 1948
- Brigadier T. Patrick D. Scott: 1948 – May 1950
- Brigadier John M.K. Spurling: May 1950 – October 1953
- Brigadier Christopher B. Lipscomb: October 1953 – ??
