= HM Prison Erlestoke =

Prison in Wiltshire, England

HMP Erlestoke
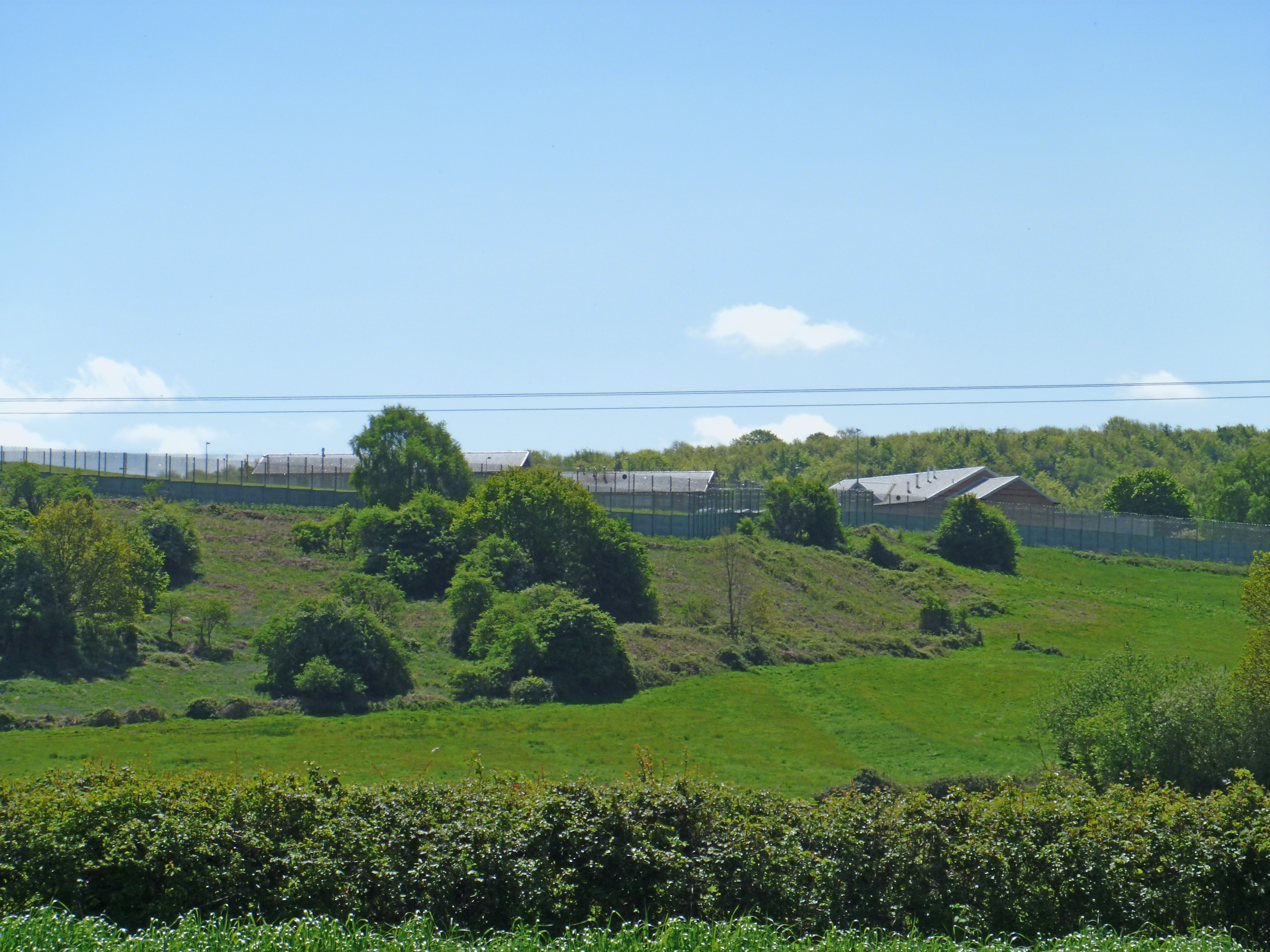
- Interactive map of HMP Erlestoke
- Location: Erlestoke, Wiltshire, England; 51.2838°N 2.0447°W
- Security class: Adult Male/Category C
- Population: 470 (December 2008)
- Managed by: HM Prison Services
- Governor: Tim Knight
- Website: Erlestoke at justice.gov.uk

HM Prison Erlestoke is a Category C men's prison, to the east of the village of Erlestoke in Wiltshire, England. Erlestoke is operated by His Majesty's Prison Service, and is the only prison in Wiltshire.

== Erlestoke House ==
The prison is built around Erlestoke House, a country house built by Joshua Smith, MP for Devizes, between 1780 and 1810. The estate was sold in 1919 and for a time a tenant of the new owner used the main house as a guest-house. From 1939 it was the home of the Army's Senior Officers' School; in 1950 the central house was severely damaged by fire but the school continued in the wings until 1961.

A single-storey lodge from the early 19th century stands at the roadside entrance to the grounds of the house. The lodge, together with gate piers and wrought iron railings of similar date, is Grade II listed.

== Prison history ==
The site was first used by the Prison Commission in 1960 as a detention centre, and many buildings were added in the grounds of Erlestoke House. The site became a young prisoners' centre in 1977, and a Category C adult male training prison in 1988.

In 1998, it was reported that thieves had broken into Erlestoke Prison and stolen £3000 worth of gardening tools from a shed. Two years later, two inmates from Erlestoke used a makeshift ladder in a daylight jailbreak. The two escapees then stole a car from a nearby farm, but then crashed it, and were subsequently recaptured by the police.

In December 2001, an inspection of Erlestoke by HM Chief Inspector of Prisons found cells in the oldest part of the prison had damp walls and poor furniture. Cleanliness was also criticised, as was the ability of some staff "to adapt to new ideas on rehabilitation" at the prison. However, a year later, a report declared Erlestoke Prison one of the best in the country, with a Government official describing the inspection report as "astoundingly good".

In March 2005, a report from the Independent Monitoring Board found that violent incidents at the prison had dramatically increased, to 1,400 annual incidents from its previous 800. In 2005, an employment tribunal awarded nearly £400,000 damages to a white prison officer of South African descent for "enduring years of racial abuse" in connection with black prisoners targeting him for his clearly identifiable accent. According to the officer, he had received little assistance from the prison's management.

In 2009 the prison was rated as one of the worst in the UK, but it improved after Andrew P.P. Rogers became governor. He worked to change the reputation of the prison from what the papers had called a "third world prison" to one of the top three prisons in the country. In 2011, Rogers put together a musical performance of West Side Story, performed by an acting academy and prisoners.

In August 2017, prison staff successfully ended a disturbance involving a few prisoners.

== Current usage ==
Erlestoke Prison receives adult male prisoners from much of England and Wales, as well as from local prisons in South Wales and Bristol in particular. Accommodation at the prison comprises eight accommodation units: three Enhanced (Imber, Sarum and Silbury A); two Standard (Alfred and Wessex); 1 Lifer and long-term prisoner unit (Wren) and an Induction Unit (Silbury B). There is also a Drug Recovery Unit (Marlborough) and a progressive regime unit (Imber and Kennet).

Most cells are single occupancy with integral sanitation. However, there are a small number of double, purpose-built cells on two of the accommodation units, and two three-bed cells on one other accommodation unit.

== Attempted escapes ==
In September 2010, a low-risk prisoner, doing gardening work outside the prison, decided to escape with the prison's tractor that he was using at the time. Having travelled about ten miles, he was spotted by a former prison officer from Erlestoke who recognised the tractor and alerted the authorities, before tailing the tractor. Realising he was being pursued, the prisoner drove onto a golf course and was followed by several police vehicles; after abandoning the vehicle, he tried to flee on foot but was cornered by a police dog and taken back into custody.

== Notable inmates ==
Alexander Blackman, often referred to as "Marine A", was held at HMP Erlestoke, having been charged with murdering an injured Taliban insurgent in the 2011 Helmand Province incident. He was found guilty in November 2013 and sentenced the following month. This sentence was reduced to manslaughter with diminished responsibility in March 2017.
