= Kurjak =

Kurjak is a Turkish word used in Bosnia and Serbia, meaning wolf or "black wolf". It may refer to:

== People ==
- Asim Kurjak (born 1942), Bosnian scientist
- Jelica Kurjak (1952-2025), Serbian diplomat
- Darko Kurjak, Serbian drummer in Partibrejkers and Oružjem Protivu Otmičara

== Other ==
- KURJAK, a Yugoimport SDPR upgrade package for BRDM-2

== See also ==
- Kurjače, village in Serbia
