= Piltdown =

Hamlets in East Sussex, England

Coordinates: 50.982°N 0.051°E

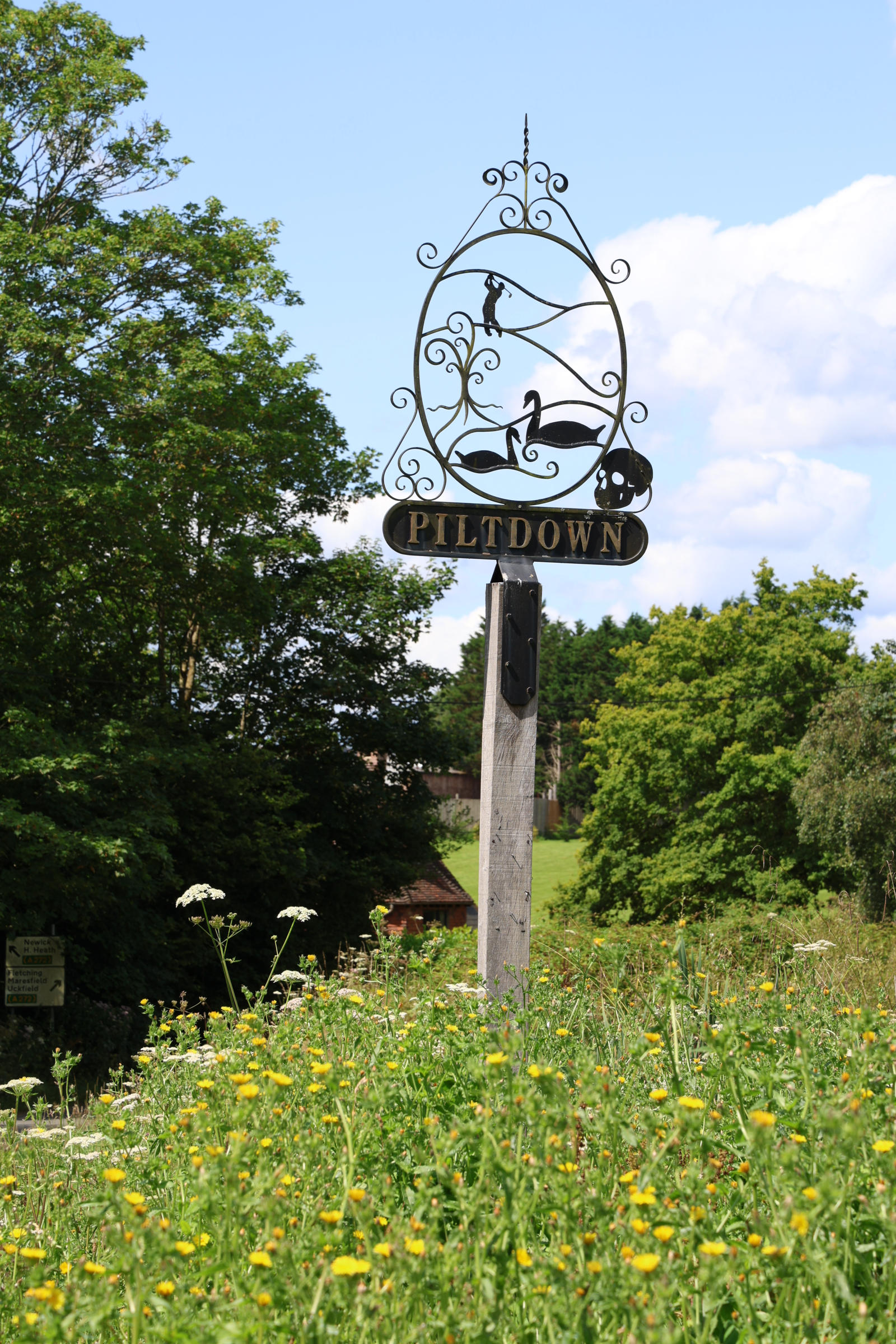
Road sign in Piltdown

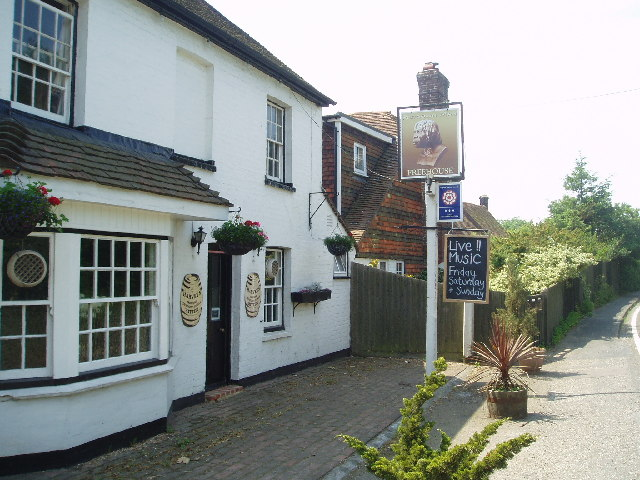
The Piltdown Man pub in Piltdown

Piltdown is a series of hamlets in East Sussex, England, located south of Ashdown Forest. It is best known for the Piltdown Man hoax where amateur archaeologist Charles Dawson claimed to have discovered evidence of the "missing link" in gravel beds near the village.

Piltdown has a pub ("The Piltdown Man", after temporarily being called "The Lamb"), a golf course, and a vineyard. It is in the Wealden district and Fletching parish.
