= John Crocker =

British Army general (1896–1963)

General Sir John Crocker GCB KBE DSO MC
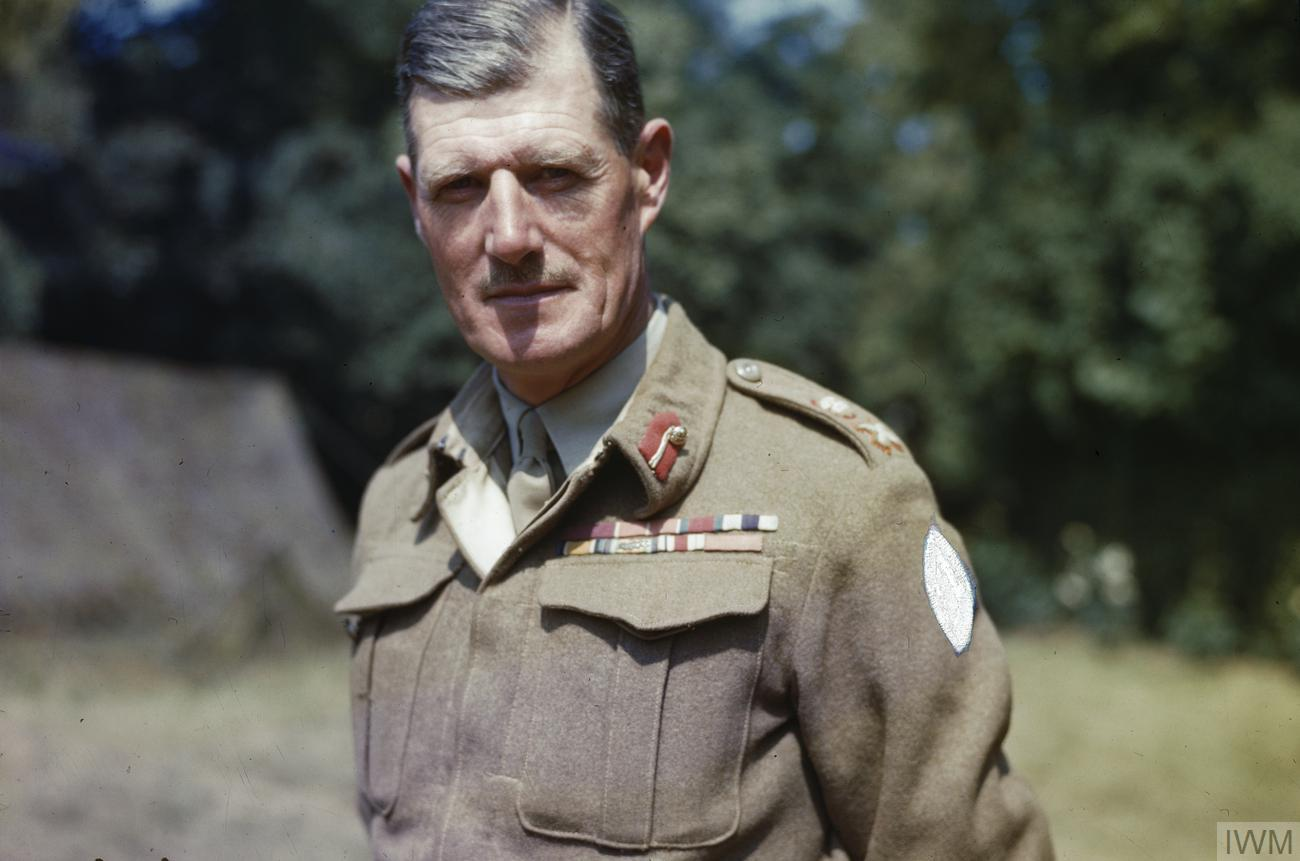
- Crocker in 1944
- Born: 4 January 1896; Catford, Lewisham, London, England
- Died: 9 March 1963 (aged 67); London, England
- Military career
- Allegiance: United Kingdom
- Branch: British Army
- Service years: 1915–1919; 1920–1953
- Rank: General
- Nickname: "Honest John"
- Service number: 10435
- Units: Artists Rifles; Machine Gun Corps; Middlesex Regiment (Duke of Cambridge's Own); Royal Tank Corps
- Commands: Adjutant-General to the Forces (1950–1953); Middle East Land Forces (1947–1950); Southern Command (1945–1947); I Corps (1943–1945); IX Corps (1942–1943); XI Corps (1942); 6th Armoured Division (1940–1941); 3rd Armoured Brigade (1940)
- Conflicts: First World War; Second World War; Palestine Emergency
- Awards: Knight Grand Cross of the Order of the Bath; Knight Commander of the Order of the British Empire; Companion of the Distinguished Service Order; Military Cross; Mentioned in Despatches (2); Grand Officer of the Order of Orange-Nassau (Netherlands)
- Other work: Vice-Chairman of the Commonwealth War Graves Commission; Lord Lieutenant of Middlesex

General Sir John Tredinnick Crocker, GCB, KBE, DSO, MC (4 January 1896 – 9 March 1963) was a senior British Army officer who fought in both world wars. He served as both a private soldier and a junior officer in the First World War. During the Second World War he served as a distinguished brigade, division and corps commander, where his most notable role was as General Officer Commanding (GOC) of I Corps during the D-Day landings on 6 June 1944, leading the corps throughout the subsequent campaign in Western Europe until Victory in Europe Day (VE-Day) just over eleven months later.

After the war was over, Crocker became Commander-in-Chief (C-in-C) of Middle East Land Forces and Adjutant-General to the Forces, the second most senior officer on the Army Council. An outstanding soldier, Crocker was highly regarded by both his superiors, most notably Field Marshal The Viscount Alanbrooke, and his subordinates, including the future Field Marshal Lord Carver, but he remains relatively unknown.

== Early life ==
As related in Delaney's book "Corps Commanders":

John Crocker was every bit the gentleman officer of his period, even if his upbringing was anything but typical. The son of Mary (Tredinnick) and Isaac Crocker, a secretary with the Champion Reef Gold Mining Company, John Crocker was born on 3 January 1896, one of five siblings who lived in a modest Exbury Road dwelling in Catford, Lewisham. Owing to a respiratory ailment, young John was too sickly to attend public school, so his mother, who had been widowed with five children since John was only four years old, somehow managed to send him instead to a retired parson for instruction. The parson was a voracious reader whose disciplined self-study and rectitude rubbed off on his pupil, as did a certain piety. Crocker remained a deeply religious man his entire life. Under the tutelage of his parson instructor, he also learned to think before speaking, to choose his words carefully, and never to lie. His tutor liked things done properly, something Crocker would always demand of his own charges. One subordinate would later comment that he possessed 'a most penetrative insight into character and behaviour. Anyone who tried to hoodwink him was on a forlorn and dangerous path.' Odd as it may have been, his unorthodox education served him well in his military career.

== First World War ==
Over a year after the outbreak of the First World War, which began in August 1914, Crocker enlisted in the British Army as a private soldier in the Artists Rifles, a training corps for potential officers, in November 1915. He was commissioned as a temporary second lieutenant into the Machine Gun Corps (MGC) on 26 January 1917. He had a distinguished career in the war, and in April and July 1918, respectively, was awarded the Military Cross (MC) and appointed a Companion of the Distinguished Service Order (DSO). After training at the Machine Gun School at Grantham, Lincolnshire, Crocker joined the 174th Machine Gun Company, part of the 59th (2nd North Midland) Division, a Territorial Force (TF) formation then serving in the trenches of the Western Front as part of the British Expeditionary Force (BEF). He fought with his company, which in early March 1918 became part of the 59th Machine Gun Battalion, in the Battle of Passchendaele (also known as the Third Battle of Ypres) in mid-1917 and in the German Army's Spring Offensives of 1918. He was promoted to the temporary rank of lieutenant on 26 July 1918.

The citation for his MC award, published in the official London Gazette reads:

T./2nd Lt. John Tredinnick Crocker, M.G. Corps. For conspicuous gallantry and devotion to duty as section commander in a machine-gun battery. He stuck to his battery until it was blown up, and then, going forward to the barrage, he salved two guns and took them forward to support the infantry, where the situation was uncertain.

The citation for the DSO reads:

T./2nd Lt. John Tredinnick Crocker, M.C., M.G.C. For conspicuous gallantry and devotion to duty. When in charge of four machine guns, he broke down two strong enemy attacks, holding on from 10a.m. till dusk, when infantry and reinforcements arrived. The following day, he maintained his position till outflanked, when he stood up between two of his guns and directed their fire on the enemy, who were within 30 yards, then covered the withdrawal with bombs and rifle fire, killing many himself at close range. Took up a fresh position until almost surrounded again, when he again went out with bombs. His example throughout was magnificent.

He continued to serve on the Western Front, fighting in the Hundred Days Offensive, until the war came to an end on 11 November 1918 with the signing of the Armistice with Germany.

== Between the wars ==
After the war, Crocker left the army to train as a solicitor. However, he did not enjoy his new profession and returned to soldiering as an infantry officer in the Middlesex Regiment (Duke of Cambridge's Own) in the Regular Army. His rank of lieutenant was confirmed on 16 December 1920 (with seniority backdated to 20 December 1919), the same year of his marriage to Hilda Mitchell; they had a daughter, Roberta, in 1921 and a son, Wilfrid, in 1923. From 13 January 1922, Crocker was seconded to the Royal Tank Corps (later the Royal Tank Regiment) to specialise in the then new field of armoured warfare. His secondment became a permanent transfer in August 1923 (backdated to June 1919).

He then went to India, where he attended the Staff College, Quetta from 1928 to 1929. Among his classmates there were Douglas Gracey, Colin Gubbins, Henry Lowrie Davies, along with George Alan Vasey of the Australian Army and E. L. M. Burns of the Canadian Army, all of whom later became general officers. He was an excellent student there, with his superiors noting his "strong and independent character". He also earned a rare A-grade, which marked him as an "officer of exceptional merit and outstanding ability". After graduating from Quetta, he then held a number of both field and staff posts including brigade major to Brigadier Percy Hobart's 1st Tank Brigade and General Staff Officer Grade 1 (GSO1) to Major-General Alan Brooke when the latter was commanding the Mobile Division (later the 1st Armoured Division). Both Hobart and Brooke came to form the highest opinion of Crocker, with Brooke later stating:

For my own personal staff, I had John Crocker as my G.S.O.1. I cannot speak too highly, and it would have been impossible to have been better served than I was by him. Having been Brigade Major to Hobart when he commanded the Armoured Brigade, he already had an intimate knowledge of the handling of armour. I thought at first that he might be so much imbued with Hobart's doctrine that I might have difficulty in getting him to agree with my views, which were not always in tune with those of Hobart. On the contrary, I found him the most loyal supporter of the views and doctrine I wished to be adopted.

He also had a period of secondment to the Royal Tank School in India from September 1925. He was promoted to captain in April 1929.

Promotion in the inter-war army was slow, and Crocker's advancement was evidenced by a succession of brevet ranks: brevet major on 1 January 1935, brevet lieutenant colonel on 1 July 1936 and brevet colonel on 1 February 1938. However, his permanent rank caught up when he was promoted to colonel on 6 August 1938 (with seniority backdated to 1 February 1938). By the time the Second World War began in September 1939, he was a GSO1 staff officer in Southern Command.

== Second World War ==
=== France and England ===
Crocker was not to remain there long, however, as on 21 April 1940 he was promoted to the acting rank of brigadier and was appointed to command of the 3rd Armoured Brigade in place of Vyvyan Pope. The brigade formed part of Major-General Roger Evans's 1st Armoured Division (formerly the Mobile Division), then serving in England but preparing to move to France. Crocker's brigade was depleted as the British Expeditionary Force (BEF) was expelled from the continent during the Battle of France in May–June 1940. Landed at Cherbourg as the rest of the BEF retreated to Dunkirk in late May, the division unsuccessfully attacked the German bridgeheads over the River Somme before returning to Cherbourg, where the remnants (including the brigade's last 13 tanks) were evacuated. Crocker and his brigade were evacuated in mid-June, Crocker himself returning with Lieutenant-General James Marshall-Cornwall on the last ship.

Back in Britain, where he was to remain for almost three years before seeing action again, Crocker initially remained in command of the brigade, which had suffered especially heavy tank losses in France, and was then serving in South East England awaiting a German invasion and training to repel it. However, on 18 September 1940, he was promoted to the acting rank of Major-General at the relatively young age of just forty-four, and became General Officer Commanding (GOC) of the newly created 6th Armoured Division. Nine days later Crocker was made a Commander of the Order of the British Empire (CBE) for his services in France. Crocker's new division, initially composed of the 20th and 26th Armoured Brigades, along with the 6th Support Group and other supporting units, was formed in Southern Command and, under its perfectionist GOC, trained intensively, with Crocker ensuring that all ranks knew their jobs before moving on to large-scale exercises. The division was moved from Southern Command, where it trained throughout the winter of 1940, to Eastern Command in late February 1941.

Crocker continued training his division for the next several months. However, in mid-October 1941, Crocker, who had by now commanded his division for just over a year, relinquished command of the division to Major-General Herbert Lumsden upon being selected to command the 2nd Armoured Group in Home Forces. The Armoured Groups were the brainchild of Major-General Giffard Martel, the Commander Royal Armoured Corps (CRAC), and were set up following his advice with the intention of commanding all the armoured formations in the United Kingdom. His rank of major-general was made temporary on 22 October 1941. The idea was short-lived and he was not to remain there long, as on 16 March 1942 Crocker was promoted to the acting rank of lieutenant-general and was given command of XI Corps, taking over from Lieutenant-General Noel Irwin, who was being posted to command IV Corps in the Mediterranean theatre. Aged just forty-six, this made Crocker one of the youngest corps commanders in the British Army. It is quite probable that Alan Brooke, who still thought highly of Crocker and was now Chief of the Imperial General Staff (CIGS), secured for him his new appointment. Crocker's new command, which had Harold Morgan's 45th, Evelyn Barker's 54th (East Anglian) and Eric Miles's 56th (London) Infantry Divisions, along with the 21st Army Tank Brigade, under command, was based in East Anglia, where it had responsibility for its defence in the event of an invasion, and was serving under Eastern Command.

=== North Africa ===
Again, Crocker's appointment was not destined to last long as, in September, he relinquished command of XI Corps over to Lieutenant-General Gerard Bucknall, and took command of IX Corps District from Lieutenant-General Francis Nosworthy. The corps, with Gordon MacMillan (later a distinguished divisional commander and full general) as its Brigadier General Staff (BGS), was then stationed in Northern England under Northern Command, with responsibility for Durham, Northumberland, and the North Riding of Yorkshire. Crocker's rank of major-general was made permanent on 4 December 1942 (with seniority backdated to 16 November 1941). On 16 March 1943, his rank of lieutenant-general was made temporary. In September, IX Corps District was mobilised to become a field force formation, was redesignated as IX Corps once again, and was assigned to the newly created British First Army. Commanded throughout its existence by Lieutenant-General Kenneth Anderson, the First Army was formed to be the parent formation for the Allied forces preparing to invade French North Africa as part of Operation Torch. Lieutenant-General Charles Allfrey's V Corps formed the other half of the British contingent of the First Army and saw bitter fighting in the early stages of the Tunisian campaign towards the end of 1942 and in early 1943.

Together with his corps HQ, Crocker departed for North Africa in the spring of 1943, with his HQ becoming operational on 24 March 1943. He took under command his old 6th Armoured Division, now under Major-General Charles Keightley, along with the 46th Infantry Division, under Major-General Harold Freeman-Attwood, and Major-General Raymond Briggs's 1st Armoured Division, which had been transferred over from the British Eighth Army. Crocker's first battle on 8 April was an attempt to cut off the retreating Italian First Army, and he ordered Keightley's 6th Armoured Division to take the Fondouk Pass, but he majorly underestimated the strength of the Italian defences there. Also under command for the operation was the U.S. 34th Infantry Division, under Major General Charles W. Ryder, which Crocker ordered to seize a key position to the right of the pass. Elements of Philip Roberts's 26th Armoured Brigade, part of the 6th Armoured Division, cut across the Americans' line of attack and caused a considerable amount of confusion. In addition, Crocker's handling of his infantry was also thought to be somewhat poor. Although the British armour did eventually break through, the Italians had by now escaped the trap. Crocker was later very critical of the Americans, which caused upset at Allied Forces Headquarters (AFHQ) and infuriated General Dwight D. Eisenhower, the Supreme Allied Commander in North Africa.

The campaign continued, with the Allies slowly tightening the noose over the Axis forces, who were still fighting harder than ever. Crocker's IX Corps was involved in heavy fighting during the latter stages of the fighting, and managed to capture two key features, Selchet el Kourizia and Two Tree Hill, on 24 April, but despite this, IX Corps still failed to break through into the Tunis Plain. On 27 April, Crocker was wounded in a training accident, during a demonstration of a PIAT (Projector, Infantry, Anti Tank) anti-tank weapon, shortly before the final battle for Tunis, and saw no further action in North Africa. A piece of shrapnel had entered Crocker's upper chest. Command of IX Corps passed temporarily to Lieutenant-General Brian Horrocks, who transferred over from the British Eighth Army's X Corps. The war in North Africa came to an end soon afterwards, with the surrender of almost 250,000 Germans and Italians. Crocker was, nonetheless, appointed a Companion of the Order of the Bath on 5 August 1943 for his command in Tunisia, and General Sir Harold Alexander, commander of the Allied 18th Army Group (which controlled both the British First and Eighth Armies), believed Crocker to have performed well throughout his relatively brief time in action.

=== North-western Europe ===
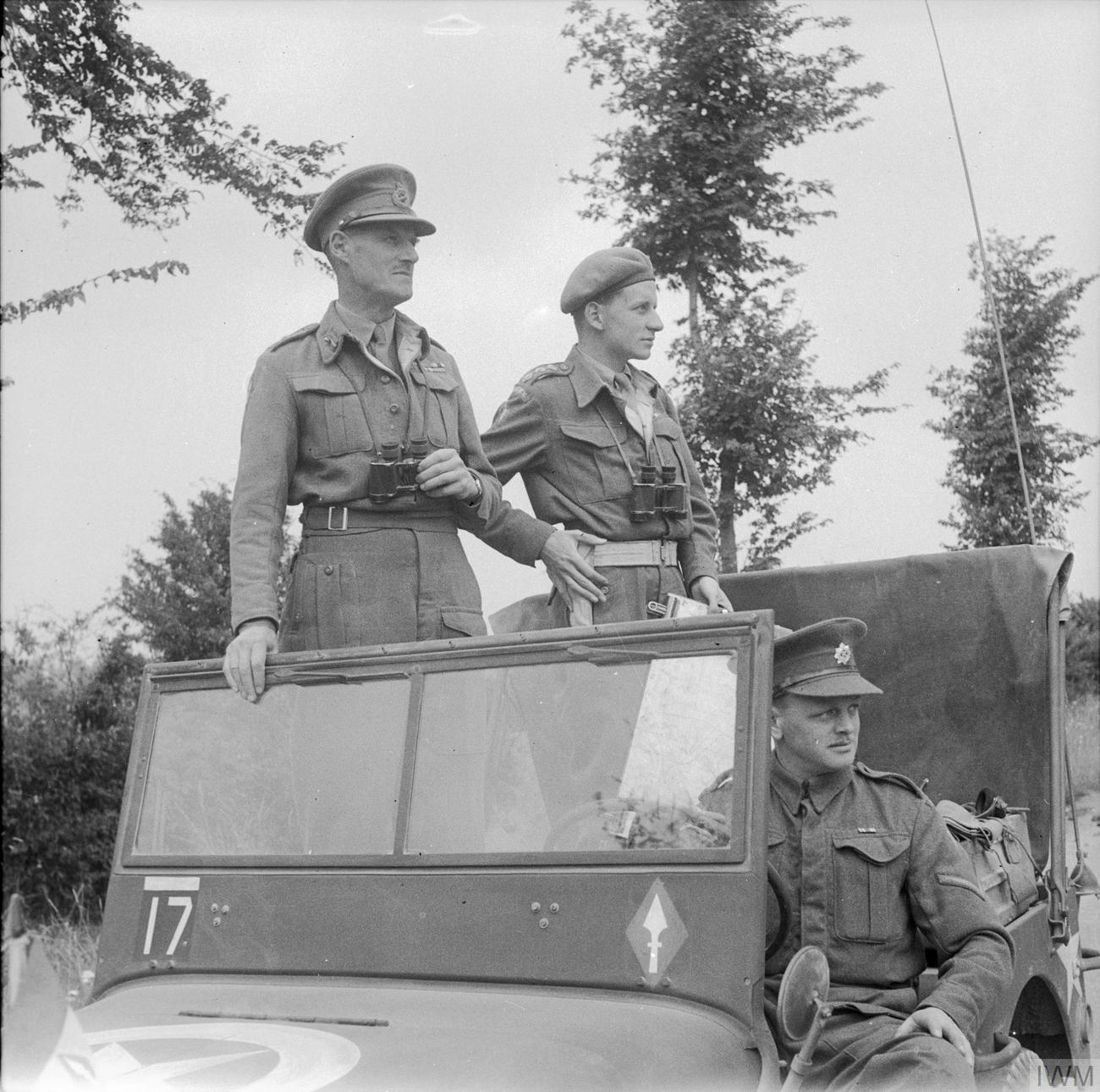
Lieutenant-General John Crocker watching the fighting near Caen from a jeep, July 1944. With him are his aide-de-camp, Captain John Cross, and Lance Corporal Marsden, his driver.

Crocker returned to England in May after his IX Corps HQ was disbanded, and he remained temporarily unemployed. On his return to service in August, he was, upon the recommendation of Alexander to Brooke, given command of I Corps in early August. Crocker took over from Lieutenant-General Gerard Bucknall, who had requested demotion to temporary major-general to command a division overseas. I Corps was to form part of the British Second Army, then under his former army commander in North Africa, Lieutenant-General Sir Kenneth Anderson (but replaced in January 1944 by Lieutenant-General Miles Dempsey), training for Operation Overlord, the Allied invasion of Northern France.

Crocker was aided throughout by his BGS, Philip Balfour. Despite Crocker's background in armoured warfare, I Corps was predominantly an infantry formation. General Sir Bernard Montgomery, the Allied Land Forces Commander for D-Day and the Battle of Normandy 21st Army Group, had confidence in Crocker's organisational skills and assigned I Corps the difficult task of capturing the city of Caen. For the landings I Corps had under command the 3rd Canadian Division, supported by the 2nd Canadian Armoured Brigade, and British 3rd Division (Major-General Tom Rennie) supported by the 27th Armoured Brigade, and the 6th Airborne Division (Major-General Richard Gale). On D-Day, 6 June 1944, Crocker had a larger task than any other Allied corps commander: he had to control two landing beaches (Juno and Sword) and an airborne assault. The fact that, in spite of inevitable mishaps, the landings went so well was a testimony to Crocker's planning.

Caen did not fall on D-Day as planned, although a battalion of the British 3rd Division made a spirited attempt before being driven back by the 21st Panzer Division. I Corps took part in the bloody two-month Battle for Caen, including Operation Charnwood, which still had the 3rd Canadian and 3rd British Divisions under command (the latter now under Major-General Lashmer Whistler after Rennie was injured), along with the 59th (Staffordshire) Infantry Division (Major-General Lewis Lyne). The operation began on 7 July and, after heavy fighting, had captured most of the Caen city centre, although the Germans still held the southern half. Colonel Hermann-Eberhard Wildermuth, in charge of German operations, urged a civilian evacuation, yet only 10,000 left, as Crocker refused the proposal. The devastation that ensued was not on Wldermuth's troops but mostly on the civilian population after German troops were already on the periphery.

The corps, losing the 3rd Division soon after and gaining the 49th Division (Major-General Evelyn Barker) in exchange, came under command of the First Canadian Army (Lieutenant-General Harry Crerar) in August 1944, I Corps drove forward to the River Seine and then took part in the Clearing the Channel Coast. The relationship between Crocker and Crerar was not always cordial, with the latter, shortly after taking Crocker's I Corps under command of the First Army, attempted to sack Crocker and replace him with either Lieutenant-Generals Neil Ritchie (GOC XII Corps) or Gerard Bucknall (GOC XXX Corps). However, Crerar was overruled by Montgomery, the 21st Army Group commander, although the relationship improved thereafter.

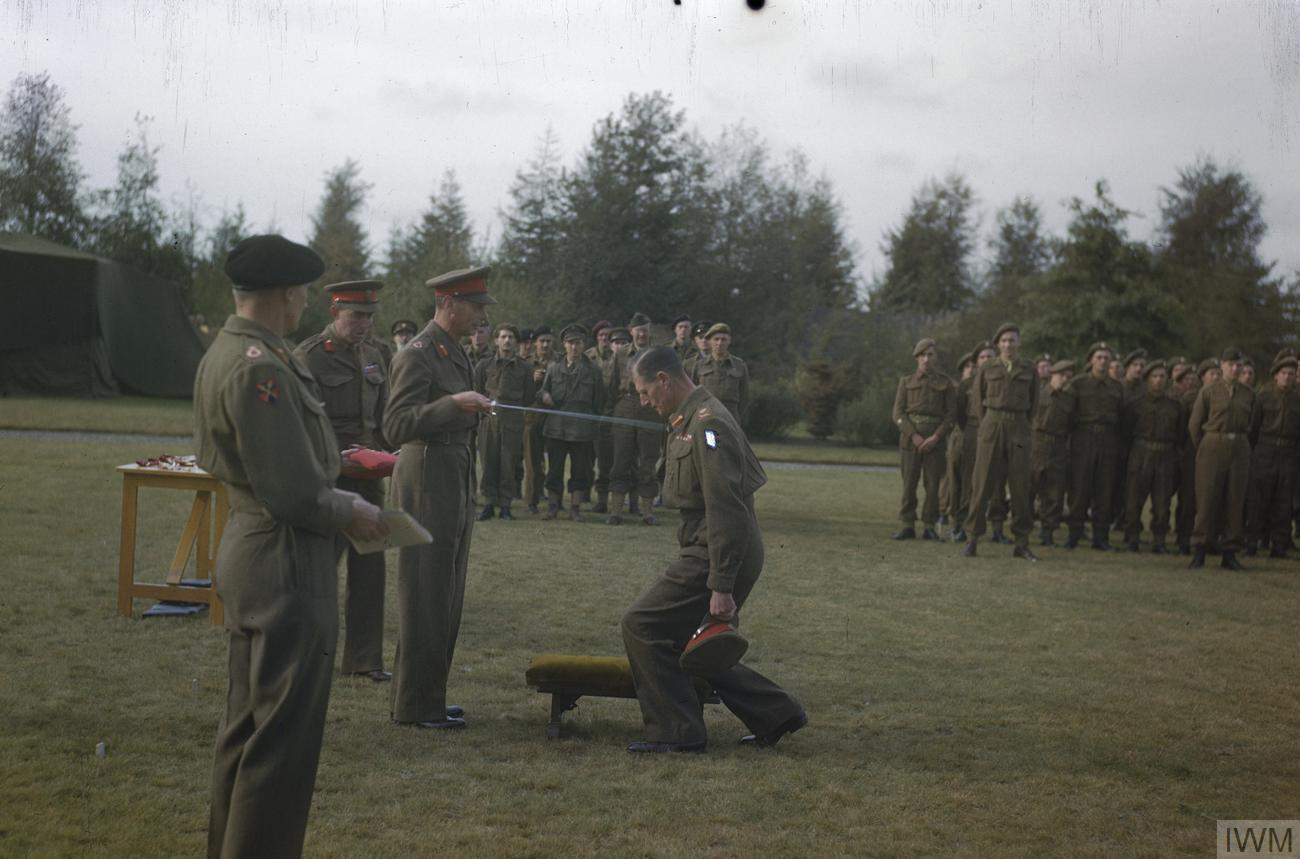
Crocker is invested with his knighthood by King George VI at the headquarters of the 21st Army Group on 15 October 1944. Montgomery is seen standing in the foreground.

When severe British manpower shortages prompted the disbandment of two infantry divisions (the 59th (Staffordshire) and 50th (Northumbrian) Infantry Division) in late 1944, I Corps HQ was withdrawn from the front line to take over the administration of the 21st Army Group's rear areas in Germany as it advanced across the river Rhine (Operation Plunder) in March 1945. Crocker was knighted as a Knight Commander of the Order of the British Empire (KBE) in October 1944 for his performance in the Normandy invasion and its aftermath. In June 1945, with the war in Europe over, Crocker returned to the United Kingdom to take over Southern Command from Lieutenant-General Sidney Kirkman, who took over I Corps from Crocker. For his services in Northwest Europe he was twice mentioned in despatches, on 9 August 1945 and again on 8 November.

Crocker's son, Wilfrid, a cavalry officer serving with the 5th Royal Inniskilling Dragoon Guards, then equipped with Cromwell tanks and part of the 7th Armoured Division, was killed in action on 20 October 1944 fighting in the battle for 's-Hertogenbosch in the Netherlands.

== Later life ==
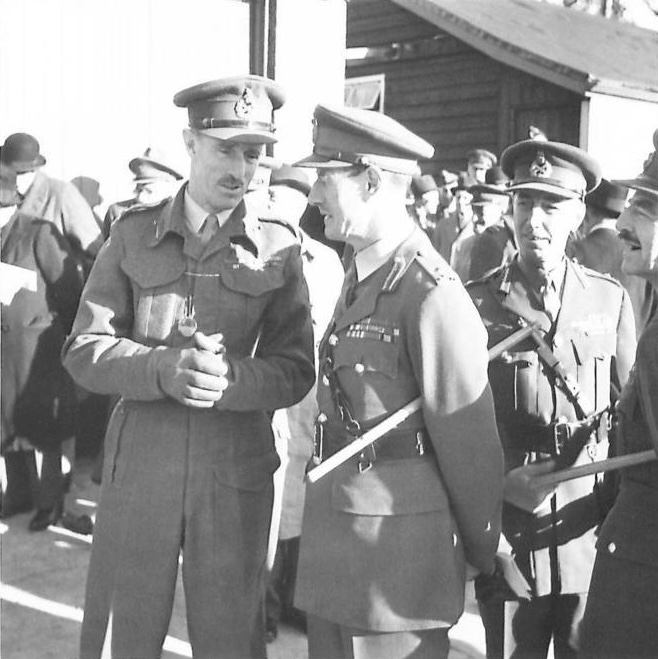
Left to right: Major-General Roger Evans, Lieutenant-General Sir John Crocker, Major-General Meade Edward Dennis. The three generals are attending a ceremony for the opening of the Army Cadet Force Centre, in South-Western District, sometime in 1945.

He remained for two years as GOC-in-C of Southern Command, until in 1947 he moved on to be Commander-in-Chief (C-in-C) Middle East Land Forces in succession to Lieutenant-General Sir Miles Dempsey during the final stages of the Palestine Emergency. He was advanced to Knight Commander of the Order of the Bath (KCB) in the 1947 Birthday Honours. In 1950, Crocker's long military career culminated in his appointment as Adjutant-General to the Forces.

Created a Knight Grand Cross of the Order of the Bath (GCB) on 10 June 1948, Crocker retired from the army on 29 September 1953. His permanent rank had been advanced to Lieutenant-General in October 1945, and he was promoted to the rank of full General on 6 March 1947. In addition to the British honours he had received, Crocker was also honoured by the Netherlands government in 1947 for his service in North West Europe in the form of being appointed a Grand Officer of the Order of Orange-Nassau with Swords.

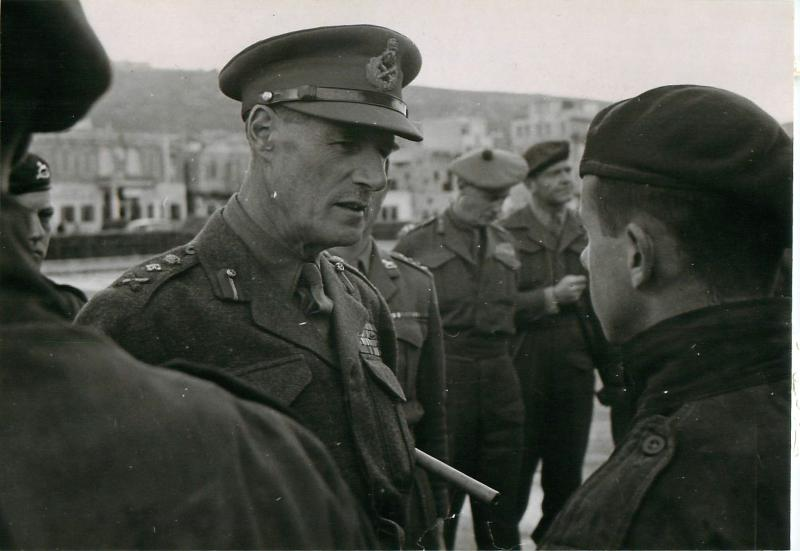
General Sir John Crocker, Commander-in-Chief Middle East, talks to airborne troops (possibly of the 6th Airborne Division) in Palestine.

In 1948 Montgomery recommended Crocker to be his successor as CIGS, but the Prime Minister, Clement Attlee, appointed the better-known and more senior General Sir William Slim, who had commanded the Fourteenth Army in the Burma Campaign during the war, much to Montgomery's annoyance. Crocker's most important postwar contribution was to write the training manuals that laid down the British Army's doctrine of armoured warfare through the years of the Cold War. Crocker held several honorary appointments throughout the postwar years, including Aide de Camp to the King (1948 to 1951), Colonel Commandant of the Royal Tank Regiment (1949), and Honorary Colonel of the Royal Armoured Corps (1949).

After retiring, he became vice-chairman of the Imperial War Graves Commission and Lord Lieutenant of Middlesex, a position he held from 1961 until his death on 9 March 1963 at the relatively young age of sixty-seven. He was also a Member of the Royal Patriotic Fund Corporation.

== Not much of a talker ==
Douglas E. Delaney writes that

John Crocker was not much of a talker, and he was a lousy self-promoter because of it. Yet he was one of the most important British soldiers of the Second World War, commanding a corps in North Africa and subsequently being assigned 'the most ambitious, the most difficult, and the most important task' of any Allied corps commander during Operation Overlord. His influence was not limited to the period of the war, either. He was intimately involved with the development of the British armoured forces during the 1920s and 1930s, and after the war, he oversaw the production of the doctrine and training publications that would guide the British Army for much of the Cold War. He also served as Commander-in-Chief, Middle East Land Forces, and he finished his career as Adjutant-General to the Forces. Field Marshal Montgomery would have preferred it if Crocker had retired as Chief of the Imperial General Staff (CIGS), but in 1949, Prime Minister Clement Attlee chose Sir William Slim instead. By almost any standard, Crocker had a very successful army career".

== Bibliography ==
- Delaney, Douglas E. (Autumn 2007). "A Quiet Man of Influence: General Sir John Crocker". Journal of the Society for Army Historical Research. 85 (343): 185–207. ISSN 0037-9700. JSTOR 44231490.
- Delaney, Douglas E. (2011). Corps Commanders: Five British and Canadian Generals at War, 1939–45. Vancouver, British Columbia: UBC Press. ISBN 978-0-7748-2090-5. OCLC 764323613.
- Mead, Richard (2007). Churchill's Lions: A Biographical Guide to the Key British Generals of World War II. Stroud, Gloucestershire: Spellmount. ISBN 978-1-86227-431-0. OCLC 907176723.
- Smart, Nick (2005). Biographical Dictionary of British Generals of the Second World War. Barnesley, Yorkshire: Pen & Sword. ISBN 978-1-84415-049-6. OCLC 58555546.

Military offices
New command	GOC 6th Armoured Division; 1940–1941	Succeeded by Herbert Lumsden
Preceded by Noel Irwin	GOC XI Corps; March–September 1942	Succeeded by Gerard Bucknall
Preceded by Francis Nosworthy	GOC IX Corps; 1942–1943	Succeeded by Brian Horrocks
Preceded by Gerard Bucknall	GOC I Corps; 1943–1945	Succeeded by Sir Sidney Kirkman
Preceded by Sir Sidney Kirkman	GOC-in-C Southern Command; 1945–1947	Succeeded by Sir John Harding
Preceded by Sir Miles Dempsey	C-in-C Middle East Land Forces; 1947–1950	Succeeded by Sir Brian Robertson
Preceded by Sir James Steele	Adjutant General; 1950–1953	Succeeded by Sir Cameron Nicholson
Honorary titles
Preceded by Frederick Page	Lord Lieutenant of Middlesex; 1961–1963	Succeeded by Gerard Bucknall
