= 20th Light Armoured Brigade =

British armoured formation of the Second World War

20th Light Armoured Brigade 20th Armoured Brigade
- 20th Armoured Brigade formation sign during the Second World War
- Active: 2 September 1939–30 April 1943
- Country: United Kingdom
- Branch: British Army
- Type: Armoured warfare
- Size: Brigade
- Brigade Peacetime HQ: Gloucester
- Mottos: Fide, sed cui vide

Commanders
- Notable commanders: Francis Mitchell

The 20th Light Armoured Brigade, later 20th Armoured Brigade was an armoured formation of the British Army which was formed on 3 September 1939. The brigade was disbanded in 1943 and its successor, the 20th Armoured Brigade (later 20th Armoured Infantry Brigade) was formed in 1950, but was a regular formation and not a Territorial Army formation.

== History ==
The 20th Light Armoured Brigade was formed on 3 September 1939 as part of the Territorial Army. The new brigade was formed as part of South Midland Area, a sub-element of Southern Command sitting alongside the 48th (South Midland) Infantry Division and 61st Infantry Division.

The Brigade played a vital role in the defence of the United Kingdom during the first year of the Second World War, including guarding aerodromes and other vulnerable points. In May 1940, due to the withdrawal of the British Expeditionary Force (BEF) from France and the increased threat of invasion, a Brigade force known as the Yeomanry Armoured Detachment was formed to defend the coast of East Anglia, concentrating at Moulton Paddocks, Newmarket as a counter-attack force to repel any potential Nazi offensive.

The Brigade subsequently moved to Surrey in June, where it was assigned to the 1st Armoured Division at the end of the month, which was being reorganised after it had returned depleted from Dunkirk. With the Battle of Britain being fought overhead, brigade troops were tasked with conducting anti-invasion exercises and the reconnaissance of all roads leading to the coast, covering most of Kent, Surrey and Sussex. It finally began to receive modern tanks in September 1940 when the first Valentine infantry tanks began to arrive.

The Brigade was reorganised and acquired the 2nd Battalion, The Rangers on 16 October 1940 when it came under the command of the 6th Armoured Division, under Major-General John Crocker, whose insignia was a white mailed fist with a black background. The mailed fist –a symbol of the hard punch that an armoured formation gives the enemy –was selected by Crocker as the division's recognition flash from a design created by Lieutenant Colonel Broadhurst, an Australian serving on his staff as assistant director of Ordnance Services (Engineering).

On 12 September 1941, King George VI inspected the Brigade at Lakenheath in Suffolk during a parade and march-past of all the fighting vehicles in the division. It was the first time that an entire armoured division – at that time over 14,500 men and 4,500 vehicles – had been formed up complete in the same place. The logistical challenges of staging the parade and the scale of the air threat sealed the fate of the Brigade, contributing towards the decision in 1942 to halve the tank strength of an armoured division.

The brigade continued to serve in Home Forces under various commands until 15 January 1943. At this time the brigade became a training formation and its regiments, on conversion to the armoured reconnaissance role, were posted elsewhere. Many former brigade troops subsequently saw active service in North West Europe including operations in Normandy and into Germany. On 30 April 1943, the 20th Armoured Brigade was disbanded.

== Order of battle ==
The following units served under the brigade:

- Brigade Headquarters
- 1st Royal Gloucestershire Hussars (3 September 1939 – 6 April 1943)
- 1st Northamptonshire Yeomanry (3 September 1939 – 3 April 1943)
- 2nd Northamptonshire Yeomanry (3 September 1939 – 20 April 1943)
- 2nd Battalion, The Rangers (15 October 1940 – 21 March 1941), re-designated as 10th Battalion, The King's Royal Rifle Corps (22 March 1941 – 7 January 1943)

== Brigade commanders ==
Commanders included:

- 1939–1942 Brigadier Evelyn Fanshawe
- 1942 Brigadier William Hinde
- 1942–1943 Brigadier Francis Mitchell

== See also ==
- British Armoured formations of World War II
- List of British brigades of the Second World War
- British Army Order of Battle (September 1939)
