= 2nd Battalion, Tower Hamlets Rifles =

2nd Battalion, Tower Hamlets Rifles 10th Battalion, Rifle Brigade (Tower Hamlets Rifles)
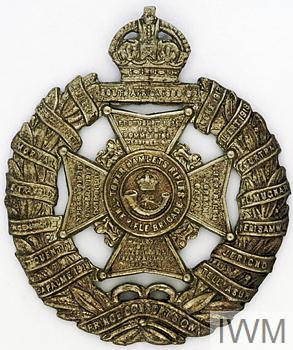
- Cap badge of the Tower Hamlets Rifles
- Active: 1939–1945
- Country: United Kingdom
- Branch: Territorial Army
- Type: Infantry Battalion
- Role: Motorised Infantry
- Part of: 6th Armoured Division
- Garrison/HQ: 66 Tredegar Road, Bow
- Engagements: Operation Torch; Run for Tunis; Kasserine Pass; Operation Diadem; Capture of Perugia; Gothic Line; Tossignano

Commanders
- Notable commanders: Lt-Col Adrian Gore; Lt-Col Richard Fyffe

The 2nd Battalion, Tower Hamlets Rifles, was a Territorial Army unit of the British Army during World War II. It fought as a motor battalion in the Tunisian campaign, including the Run for Tunis and Battle of Kasserine Pass, and in the Italian Campaign from Monte Cassino to the Apennines, including the seizure of the Muraglione Pass.

== Origin ==
The origin of the Tower Hamlets Rifles lay in an invasion scare of 1859, when large numbers of Rifle Volunteer Corps (RVCs) were formed across Britain. Among these were the 15th Middlesex (The Customs and Docks) and the 2nd Tower Hamlets RVCs, which were raised in the East End and London's docklands. Both battalions were affiliated to the Regular Army's Rifle Brigade. When the Territorial Force was formed in 1908, they combined to form the 17th (County of London) Battalion, London Regiment (Poplar & Stepney), with its drill hall at 66 Tredegar Road, Bow. (Note: The Tower Hamlets were the East End villages that constituted the Tower division of the County of Middlesex. The 1908 title indicated the two London metropolitan boroughs (Poplar and Stepney) from which the battalion recruited. Today these are included in the London Borough of Tower Hamlets.)

The part-time Territorials were mobilised on the outbreak of World War I and the 17th Londons served on the Western Front from 1915 until 1918. It formed a 2nd Line battalion (2/17th Londons) that also went to France, but later served at Salonika and in the Sinai and Palestine campaign before returning to the Western Front in the closing stages of the war.

After the war the TF was reorganised as the Territorial Army (TA), and the London Regiment had fallen into abeyance. The unit was reformed in 1920 and changed its title to 17th London Regiment (Tower Hamlets Rifles) in 1926. When the London Regiment was formally abolished it became the Tower Hamlets Rifles, The Rifle Brigade (Prince Consort's Own) in 1937, simply known as the Tower Hamlets Rifles (THR). With the doubling of the TA after the Munich Crisis, the THR formed a 1st and 2nd Battalion in 1939, just before the outbreak of World War II (a 3rd Bn was also formed later).

== World War II ==
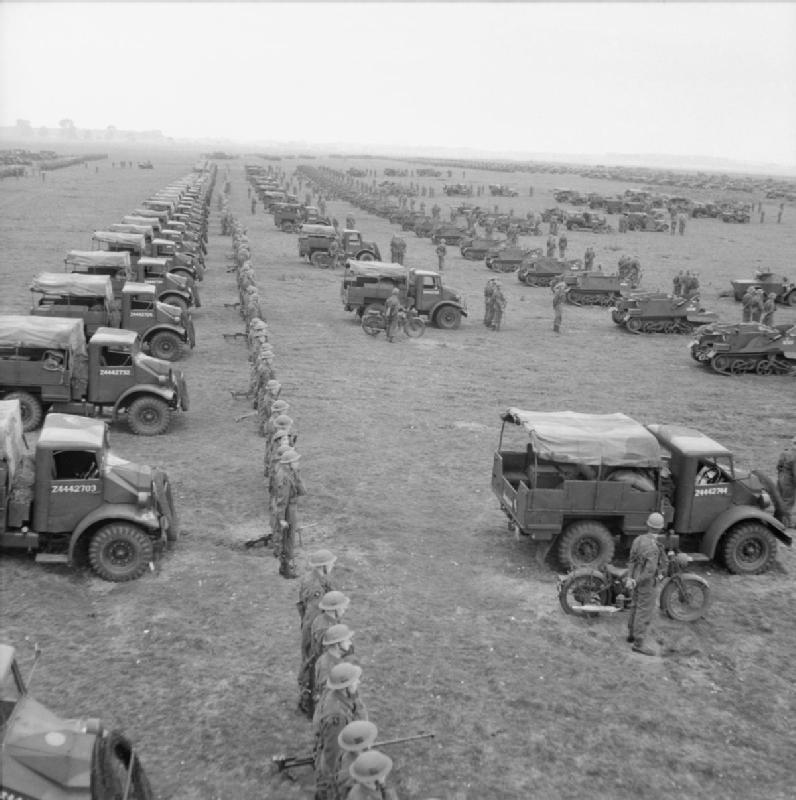
A motor battalion of 6th Armoured Division on parade in the UK with Universal carriers and Morris CS8 15-hundredweight trucks.

=== Mobilisation ===
The TA was mobilised on 1 September 1939 and war was declared on 3 September. Both THR battalions mobilised in 3rd London Infantry Brigade, which was temporarily in 1st London Division until the new duplicate 2nd London Division was formed in October.

During World War II the 'Greenjackets' (the King's Royal Rifle Corps (KRRC) and the Rifle Brigade, including their affiliated TA battalions) specialised in providing motorised infantry battalions to armoured brigades and armoured division support groups. The THR battalions were converted into motor battalions in 1940.

=== 10th Rifle Brigade (Tower Hamlets Rifles) ===
The 2nd Bn THR was assigned to 26th Armoured Bde when that was formed on 16 October 1940. It became 10th Bn Rifle Brigade (Tower Hamlets Rifles) (10th RB) (Note: Not to be confused with the 10th (Service) Bn, Rifle Brigade, formed in 'Kitchener's Army' in World War I.) on 15 January 1941 (when 1st THR also became 9th Rifle Brigade).

26th Armoured Bde joined 6th Armoured Division on 9 November, and the battalion remained with this formation for the rest of its service. At the time, the division was training in Southern Command, moving to Eastern Command in February 1941, and did not form part of the field force. Then in April 1942 it came under direct War Office control as it prepared to proceed on overseas service. It was assigned to V Corps as part of First Army for the planned Allied landings in North Africa (Operation Torch).

=== Tunisia ===
==== Operation Torch ====
The bulk of 26th Armoured Bde sailed from the UK on 9 November, the day after the initial landings began, but an armoured regimental group called 'Blade Force' had been sent on ahead in one of the first follow-up convoys, and this arrived at Algiers on 12 November. Blade Force was based on the tanks of 17th/21st Lancers and included B Company of 10th RB along with detachments of armoured cars (B Squadron, Derbyshire Yeomanry), artillery, engineers and transport, all under the command of Colonel Richard Hull. The force was intended to drive rapidly eastwards across Algeria to capture the city of Tunis by Coup de main (the Run for Tunis). Once they had been unloaded, the wheeled vehicles set out for the Tunisian frontier on 15 November while the tracked vehicles followed by train to the assembly area at Souk Ahras. The road convoy covered 400 miles (640 km) in 48 hours in driving rain, and on 18 November B Company was ordered to take up defensive positions at El Kef on the railway, where French troops were already in position and willing to fight the Germans. The company moved on to Souk Ahras and then Testour, where it was bombed by German Stukas on 21 November, and a detachment went on to Slouguia. Here the French made contact with German forces, confirming that they had reached Tunis first: Blade Force would be unable to carry out its coup de main against an open city.

One 24 November Blade Force attempted to find a way into Tunis by a northerly route via Mateur. The Derbyshire Yeomanry reported the enemy in occupation of a farm on high ground at a junction on the Mateur road. B Company's carrier platoon reported the ground to the right of the road to be suitable for tanks, so soon after 11.00 the 17th/21st Lancers attacked, with B Company following to mop up. One platoon ran into heavy opposition but the reserve platoon and reserve tanks came up and the position was cleared by 13.00, with over 100 prisoners taken. B Company had lost two killed and six wounded in its first action. It was now only 10 miles (16 km) from Tunis, providing a flank guard to the main advance. For several days it remained in this position, being bombed and machine-gunned from the air at regular intervals. However, the Axis build-up by sea and air at Tunis was faster than that by the Allied forces advancing from Algeria, and on 1 December a superior force of German tanks and infantry with air support began moving on the British positions and threatening the Tebourba Gap. B Company was ordered to withdraw to Tebourba, during which No 8 Platoon was practically cut off and attacked from the air: most of the platoon could not be extricated. The carrier platoon withdrew across country but lost three vehicles. The force reorganised at Tebourba, where any hope of seizing Tunis was given up.

==== Bou Arada ====
B Company took no further part in operations until 21 December when it went back in the line at 'Banana Ridge' when the enemy threatened the Allied positions at Medjez el-Bab. On 27 December it was able to withdraw and rejoin 10th RB at El Aroussa, having lost two officers and 45 riflemen since landing. The rest of 10th Rifle Brigade commanded by Lt-Col Adrian Gore had landed at Bône on 7 December, and bivouacked outside the town to escape the nightly bombing raids. The vehicles arrived on 19 December, except D Company's carriers, which had been on a ship of the convoy that was sunk. The battalion then made a two-day journey to Testour, and deployed first at Sidi Ayed on 24 December, then at Bou Arada on 2 January 1943. Here it began patrolling and laying night ambushes, frequently skirmishing with the enemy. On 10 January the Germans ambushed a Yeomanry troop at dawn as they took up their observation post on 'Two Tree Hill, and then began to take over a neighbouring ridge that dominated Bou Arada. The Germans were turned off the ridge by A Company of the 10th RB and a tank squadron of 17th/21st Lancers. Next day D Company riding the tanks of a squadron of 17th/21st Lancers attacked Two Tree Hill, to find the Germans holding strong positions hidden on the reverse slope. After this attack was driven off there were three more by forces of varying sizes, but the Germans continued in possession of the hill until they withdrew in April. Argoub el Hanach (Point 315) was a similar feature to Two Tree Hill, and B and C Companies occupied it on 17–18 January Before they were fully established they saw a heavy column from 10th Panzer Division drive past them to attack Bou Araba as part of Operation Eilbote I ('Courier I'). Cut off from the rest of the battalion, the two companies played little part in the action, in which the German thrust at Bou Arada was thrown back, but they did lay some mines across the panzers' line of retreat. Next day the whole of 10th RB took up position on Argoub el Hanach, and came under heavy shellfire while the action swirled around in the valley below for the next three weeks.

==== Kasserine ====
On 19 February the Axis launched a major attack on the US forces at Kasserine Pass, south of 26th Armoured Bde's positions, and made rapid progress. Brigadier C.A.L. Dunphie of 26th Armoured Bde in reserve was anxious to help, but was only allowed to send a small force under Lt-Col Gore. 'Gore Force' consisted of C Company 10th RB, C Squadron 2nd Lothians and Border Horse (7 Valentine tanks and 4 Crusader tanks), F Battery, Royal Horse Artillery (Honourable Artillery Company), and a Troop of 93rd (Argyll & Sutherland Highlanders) Anti-Tank Regiment, Royal Artillery. At 10.00 on 20 February Gore Force moved down to help the assorted US units of 'Stark Force' in the pass, but the defences collapsed at about 13.00, and Gore Force had to leapfrog slowly back towards Thala, losing all its tanks in the process. It rejoined 26th Armoured Bde in the evening. Next day Axis forces began advancing over the heathland towards Thala: the low ridges facing them were held by the tanks of 17th/21st Lancers and the rest of 2nd Lothians & Border Horse, supported by C Company 10th RB, F Bty RHA and 450th Bty from 71st (West Riding) Field Regiment, RA, later joined by the rest of 10th RB. 10th Panzer Division slowly pushed this force back from ridge to ridge towards Thala. At dusk the remaining tanks of 17th/21st Lancers fell back through 10th RB to 'harbour' for the night. However, they were followed in by Germans tanks and a confused battle erupted, clarified when a German tank was set on fire, and the remainder were eliminated by its light. On 22 February the brigade unsuccessfully tried to dislodge the Germans from 'Leicester Ridge' which they had captured, but by 23 February the attack had petered out, and C Company re-occupied Leicester Ridge and later followed up towards Kasserine Pass. On 28 February the battalion was rushed to Medjez el-Bab in anticipation of another Axis attack that did not come, and 10th RB returned to the Argoub.

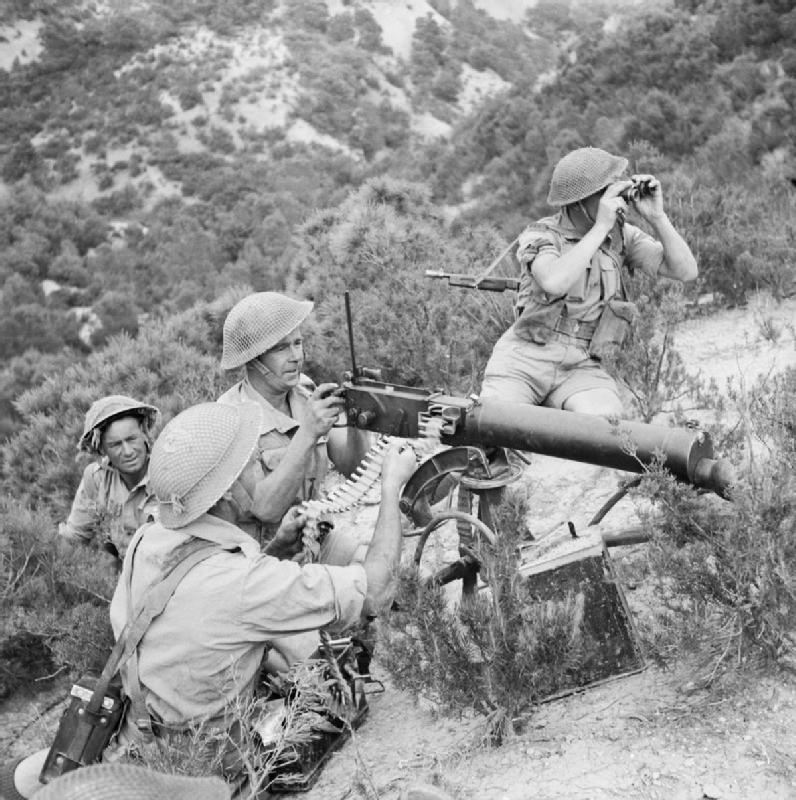
A Vickers machine gun team of 10th Rifle Brigade training near Bou Arada, Tunisia, 30 April 1943.

==== Fondouk Pass ====
On 17 March 26th Armoured Bde was withdrawn to re-equip and train. On 4 April it returned to the front to support First Army's attempt to penetrate the Fondouk Pass. While the fighting at Fondouk continued on 8 April First Army had the opportunity to attack 10th Panzer Division in the flank as it withdrew from in front of Eighth Army. 26th Armoured Bde was ordered to force the pass. 17th/21st Lancers suffered heavy tank losses in a minefield, and C company accompanying them came under intense fire. However, towards evening the 16th/5th Lancers with A Company's scout platoon found a way round the left flank of the enemy anti-tank screen positioned on hillocks. The carriers drove rapidly over open ground covered by the tanks' guns, then the riflemen dismounted and charged the anti-tank guns on one hillock. Form there they were able to bring down Bren gun fire on the other anti-tank guns, driving off the gunners and allowing 16th/5th Lancers to resume their advance. The rest of 10th RB had to wait under shellfire while this action was carried out, but next day it was able to take part in the pursuit; 16th/5th Lancers and A Company caught the rear of 10th Panzer Division and destroyed a number of tanks. The following day A Company was attacked by dive-bombers but the rest of the battalion rounded up numerous prisoners before the German tanks and anti-tank guns established a new line. 10th Rifle Brigade was then withdrawn to Bou Arada.

==== Tunis ====
First Army launched the final advance on Tunis (Operation Vulcan) on 23 April. At first 6th Armoured Division faced determined opposition and difficult ground, but gained 10 miles (16 km) in the day, with 10th RB following up through minefields and shelling. The battalion's 3-inch mortars engaged some enemy tanks hiding in dead ground and drove them off. The division's advance was held up next day and it was withdrawn into reserve. B Company of 10th RB was sent to patrol the top of Djebel Kournine on the night of 25/26 April, and reported it clear of the enemy. However, there were enemy positions on the reverse slope, and it was never captured despite much later fighting by other units. By 5 May the infantry had broken through the final defences and 6th Armoured Division entered Tunis (Operation Strike); 10th RB drove past derelict defences. On 7 May the division was sent through the southern suburbs to cut off Axis forces retreating into the Cape Bon peninsula. 26th Armoured Bde was sent towards Hammam-Lif between the mountains and the Gulf of Tunis, running into an anti-tank screen on the outskirts of the town. B Company of 10th RB was sent forward to deal with these guns but it was too big a task. The whole of 6th Armoured Division's infantry brigade (1st Guards Bde) was sent up to assault the town, but 2nd Lothians and Border Horse managed to force their way through along the shore. 10th Rifle Brigade drove through cheering French civilians to the palace of the Bey of Tunis, whose palace guard formally surrendered to the battalion. Thousands of prisoners had to be secured. Only a few crack Axis divisions were left in action, sandwiched between 6th Armoured Division and Eighth Army. They were bombed and shelled in preparation for a fullscale assault, but surrendered on 12 May.

=== Italy ===
6th Armoured Division was held back from the early stages of the Italian campaign, and remained training in Tunisia. Adrian Gore left 10th RB on promotion to brigadier on 18 February 1944, and Major Richard Fyffe from C Company took over temporary command. On 6 March 1944 the advance party of the battalion embarked at Bizerta, followed on 12 March by the main body from Bône, landing at Naples two days later. By 27 March the battalion was concentrated at Piedimonte d'Alife, where Lt-Col A.R.C. 'Dick' Southby arrived on 21 March to take over command (Maj Fyfffe was promoted to command a battalion of the Royal West Kent Regiment in May). on 7 April the battalion was sent up to hold a piece of the line opposite San Angelo, south of Monte Cassino, under 2nd Parachute Bde. It acted in a purely infantry role, actively patrolling at night, returning to Piedimonte d'Alife after 10 days.

==== Liri Valley ====
Plans were now being made for an advance up the Liri Valley (Operation Diadem) in association with attacks on Monte Cassino. 26th Armoured Bde formed an armoured reconnaissance group consisting of 10th RB and the tanks of the Derbyshire Yeomanry. XIII Corp established a small bridgehead over the Rapido on 11 May, and 10th RB began to cross on 13 May. By 15 May only the scout platoons had been able to get across, but they with the Derbyshire Yeomanry were able to make some progress. As the Allies slowly pushed forward a gap opened up between 78th Division and I Canadian Corps: on 16 May 10th RB was put in to fill this gap. This entailed capturing Point 83, which commanded the road to Aquino. The approaches to the river crossing were still choked with traffic and under shellfire and it was not until nightfall that the motor companies were able to cross. A and B Companies then put in a night attack over difficult unreconnoitred ground and their first attempt failed. They attacked again at dawn, with extra artillery support, which caught the Germans just as they pulled out. They had also evacuated the monastery of Monte Cassino, and 10th RB was able to press on up the Liri Valley, collecting prisoners. On 18 May the leading vehicles of the battalion's reconnaissance group came up against the Hitler Line. At dawn next day B Company's carrier platoon went forward to reconnoitre Aquino, running into a roadblock that was covered by machine guns, but destroying a towed anti-tank gun. All the platoon's carriers were knocked out by the retaliatory fire, but the platoon commander, Lieutenant Ralph Stewart-Wilson, reconnoitred on foot for 6 hours, bringing back a complete picture of the defences. This was too big a job for a motor battalion, so 10th RB was relieved by a brigade of 78th Division and went back for a rest. On 25 May it was back on the road, passing through a gap in the Hitler Line made by the Canadians, until it reached the Melfa, where the bridge was blocked by a knocked-out tank and B Company suffered casualties. The battalion scouted the riverbank for an alternative crossing, and next morning waded across where the only remaining enemy were a few deserters. 1st Guards Bde then passed through this bridgehead and continued the advance. On 29 May the enemy fell back again, allowing the Lothians and Border Horse to follow up Route 6 to Arce, where 10th RB was ordered to cross the river and capture Fontana Liri. This time the bridge was blown and the river was too deep to wade: by the time the battalion found a way round the town had been evacuated, but they suffered numerous casualties from booby-traps. The battalion was relieved that night, having suffered casualties of two officers killed and four wounded, 18 riflemen killed and 68 wounded.

In view of the mountainous country it was clear that the armour needed additional infantry support. 6th Armoured Division was therefore reorganised with a second infantry brigade, and 10th RB left 26th Armoured Bde to join 'M Brigade', soon designated 61st Infantry Bde. This comprised the 2nd, 7th (London Rifle Brigade) and 10th (THR) Bns of the Rifle Brigade, under Brig Adrian Gore. All three were motor battalions detached from armoured brigades, but while 10th RB remained as such, the other two battalions were reorganised as lorried infantry, still mobile, but with fewer vehicles of their own. On 29 May the rest of the brigade caught up with 10th RB in the Liri Valley.

==== Perugia ====
On 2 June 61st Bde moved up Route 6 to begin mopping up behind the advancing armour. 10th Rifle Brigade was called to take the lead on 4 June, and it had to struggle through traffic and blocked roads to catch up with the armour, who were held up at a blown bridge. That night it took Monte Morrone (overlooking the bridge) without opposition. The division now advanced up the Tiber Valley along Route 4, meeting a rearguard at Mentana, which 10th RB and B Sqn Derbyshire Yeomanry were ordered to outflank. The main problems were minefields covered by mortars and machine guns. Next day 61st Bde was given a rest and left behind the advance. It was brought forward again so that 7th Armoured Division could put in an infantry attack to clear Perugia. This involved four successive night attacks, beginning on 18/19 June. In the first attack 10th RB was tasked with seizing Monte Lacugnano: A and B Companies succeeded in reaching this, but in the dark they had bypassed many German parties, and after daybreak they came under fire from all directions. However, the seizure decided the Germans to evacuate Perugia, and the rest of the brigade pressed on over the following nights to clear the hills dominating the town. On 20/21 June 10th RB relieved 2nd RB, which had been pinned down in front of Corciano, and on Monte Rentella. Next morning the battalion came under heavy attack on both positions, and casualties were heavy on both sides in hand-to-hand fighting. D Company was cut off and many captured, while C Company had to be withdrawn from Monte Rentella, but German attacks with armour failed to drive A Company out of Corcianao Church, which dominated the positions. Next night the battalion's patrols found the enemy withdrawing to the Gothic Line positions. 61st Brigade was withdrawn to rest and recover from its heavy casualties.

==== Gothic Line ====
The pursuit to the Gothic Line now began, with 6th Armoured Division driving up Route 71 towards Arezzo. A regimental group comprising 10th RB and 16th/5th Lancers set out on 3 July, with a motor platoon out in front to try to find the enemy. It made 3 miles (4.8 km) before dark, and another 11 miles (18 km) next day, with road demolitions the main problems. 10th Rifle Bde then made contact some 5 miles (8.0 km) south of Arezzo. Here it was held up by demolitions covered by anti-tank guns, with the road overlooked by the hills of Monte Lignano to the right. On 5 July the battalion attempted to clear these hills, but the enemy were dug in on reverse slopes. Confused fighting continued until 9/10 July, when the brigade was relieved. Later the 2nd New Zealand Division and 1st Guards Bde cleared the hill features and on 15 July 10th RB entered Arezzo with 26th Armoured Bde. Without pausing they raced to the bridges over the Arno 5–6 miles (8.0–9.7 km) further on. A Company with 2nd Lothians captured the bridge at Buriano intact, but the more important road bridge was blown up when B Company and 16th/5th Lancers were within 100 yards (91 m).

6th Armoured Division's axis of advance was now switched to the west, following the Arno and directed on Pontassieve. It started from Arezzo on 16 July, but it took until 30 August to reached its objective. The three battalions of 61st Bde were almost continuously engaged and daily casualties mounted steadily. By 26 August the motor companies were down to 50 men each. Lieutenant-Col Southby had been evacuated sick, and after a short period under Maj N.C. 'Bobby' Selway, Lt-Col Fyffe returned to command the battalion on 30 August.

In early September 10 and 7 RB alternated in supporting 17th/21st Lancers' advance up the Sieve Valley. The brigade was rested from 10 to 16 September, and then returned to the front among the defences of the Gothic Line that had been abandoned by the enemy. However, the enemy were still in the hills beyond (the 'Green I' line) and 10th RB carried out patrols to find routes into the hills for the armour. The battalion was now operating as pure infantry, supplied by pack mules. On the dark night of 20/21 September 2nd and 10th RB captured Monte Erbolini, then D Company passed through and established itself at the top of the Muraglione Pass between the Sieve Valley and the Po Valley. The Royal Engineers followed up to repair the demolitions in the road over the pass, while the rest of 61st Bde pushed on by foot. On 27 September 26th Armoured Bde attempted to advance from the pass, with 10th RB in support, but the vehicles remained stuck on the road in appalling weather for three days before the operation was called off. Better progress was made on 6 October when the weather improved, 10th RB taking over the ground won by 17th/21st Lancers. By 15 October the battalion's patrols had pushed forward into Portico.

==== Tossignano ====
6th Armoured Division was now switched to the Santerno Valley, a short distance away but entailing two long marches. 10th Rifle Brigade was established on Monte Capello, dominating the valley below, and began a series of aggressive patrols in the direction of Monteloro. Although winter weather slowed all operations, Eighth Army opened an offensive against the line of the River Lamone in December. 61st Brigade was tasked with capturing Tossignano on the night of 12/13 December. 2nd Rifle Brigade got up into the town but were heavily counter-attacked all next day. 10th Rifle Brigade reinforced 2nd RB the following night, but the route up was difficult, D Company was unable to attack until 03.00 and C Company was pinned down just below the town. Communications with 2nd RB broke down on 14 December, and the battalion was overrun, despite three relief attempts by 10th RB. Afterwards the town was heavily bombed and shelled, and the ruins were frequently patrolled by 10th RB, but the town remained in enemy hands until the following April.

==== Disbandment ====
By Spring 1945 the Allied forces in Italy were suffering a manpower crisis and a number of units were broken up to provide reinforcements for others. 10th Rifle Brigade passed into 'suspended animation' on 20 March 1945, when the remaining personnel were used to recreate the 2nd RB (almost destroyed at Tossignano), reinforce the 7th RB, and to form 2nd Heavy Support Company (two platoons of Vickers machine guns and two of 4.2-inch mortars) and a reinforcement company for the brigade. Lieutenant-Col Fyffe took over command of 2nd Bn at the same time.

== Postwar ==
When the TA was reconstituted on 1 January 1947, 9th RB (THR) absorbed 10th RB (THR) and was reformed in an anti-aircraft role as 656th Light Anti-Aircraft Regiment, Royal Artillery (Tower Hamlets). It went through a series of subsequent mergers until the Tower Hamlets lineage ended in 1971.
