= Adrian Gore (British Army officer) =

English cricketer

Brigadier Adrian Gore DSO
- Born: 14 May 1900; Ayr, Scotland
- Died: 7 June 1990 (aged 90); Horton Priory
- Education: Eton College
- Spouse: Enid Aimée
- Children: 3
- Relatives: Robert Clements Gore, CB, CMG, and Rachel Cecilia
- Military career
- Allegiance: United Kingdom
- Branch: British Army
- Service years: 1919−?
- Rank: Brigadier
- Service number: 12503
- Unit: Rifle Brigade (The Prince Consort's Own)
- Commands: Green Jackets Officer Cadet Training Unit
- Conflicts: World War II
- Awards: Distinguished Service Order and Bar

Brigadier Adrian Clements Gore DSO (14 May 1900 – 7 June 1990) was a British Army officer who served with distinction in World War II. He won fame as a schoolboy cricketer for Eton College and was named as a Wisden Cricketer of the Year in 1919.

== Early life ==
Gore was born at Ayr in Scotland in 1900, the only child of Army officer Robert Clements Gore, CB, CMG, and his wife Rachel Cecilia (daughter of Llewellyn Traherne Bassett Saunderson, JP and Lady Rachel Mary Scott, daughter of the 3rd Earl of Clonmell). At birth he was initially believed to have been stillborn and was placed to one side to be buried until a nurse noticed that the child was alive. He was a descendant of Sir William Gore, 3rd Baronet.

Gore is recorded as having been at Harristown House, Ireland on the night of 2 April 1911, when the 1911 census of Ireland was carried out. Ten year old Gore was noted as being the grand-nephew of residents Percy La Touche and wife Annette.

Gore was educated at Eton College and the Royal Military College, Sandhurst.

Gore's father served in the Argyll and Sutherland Highlanders in the Second Boer War and in India before serving in France during World War I. He rose to the rank of Brigadier-General and was commanding the 101st Brigade in Belgium when he was killed in action in April 1918 aged 50. He is buried at Lijssenthoek Military Cemetery near Ypres.

== Cricket ==
Gore was a "naturally gifted all-round sportsman" who Wisden described as having "a touch of genius". He played games such as racquets at school but played little cricket before 1918, his final year at Eton. During the 1918 season he shot to fame as a fast-medium bowler with a devastating late in-swing who demolished both adult and other schoolboy cricketers. He took 51 wickets in all that season, at an average of 7.51 runs per wicket. With no first-class cricket played in the season, Wisden picked Gore and four other public school cricketers for its annual five Cricketers of the Year feature.

From 1921 to 1932, he played 16 first-class matches, mainly for The Army although he appeared twice for the Combined Services against touring international teams and once for the Gentlemen in the 1925 Gentlemen v Players match at Folkestone. He took a total of 52 first-class career wickets at a bowling average of 21 runs apiece.

== Military career ==
After passing out from Sandhurst, Gore was commissioned as a second lieutenant into the Rifle Brigade (The Prince Consort's Own) on 17 December 1919. He served during most of the interwar period with the 2nd Battalion of his regiment, initially in Ireland during the Irish War of Independence and then in Turkey and Malta.

By the outbreak of World War II in September 1939, Gore was training officer for the Rifle Brigade and was serving at the regimental depot at Winchester. In 1941 he was selected to command the Green Jackets Officer Cadet Training Unit (OCTU). The Rifle Brigade, along with the King's Royal Rifle Corps (KRRC), provided the motorised infantry battalions for the British Army's armoured divisions.

He remained in this role until the following year when he was given command of the 10th Battalion, Rifle Brigade (Tower Hamlets Rifles) for the Tunisian campaign. He temporarily commanded the 7th Motor Brigade, before being promoted to brigadier and taking over the 2nd Infantry Brigade, with which he served at the Anzio beachhead. He was recalled from Anzio to form 61st Infantry Brigade (consisting of battalions of the Rifle Brigade), which he commanded throughout the remainder of the Italian campaign. He was slightly wounded when a jeep was blown up on a mine. He temporarily commanded the 6th Armoured Division while the division was on occupation duty in Austria from July 1945 and later at Verona between September 1945 and March 1946.

== Personal life ==
In 1927, Gore married Enid Aimée (1902–1997), daughter of John Jameson Cairnes, of Horton Priory, Sellindge, Kent. They had a son, Major Toby Clements Gore (b. 1927), of the Rifle Brigade, High Sheriff of Berkshire in 1993, and two daughters: Dinah (1930–1987), who married Lt-Col J. Richard S. Besly (1931–2019), of the Grenadier Guards, and had two sons and three daughters; and Belinda (b. 1940), who married Sir Anthony Frederick Milbank, 5th Baronet, and had two sons and a daughter.

== Death ==
Gore died in June 1990 at Horton Priory, aged 90, survived by his son and younger daughter.

== Bibliography ==
- Doherty, Richard (2004). Ireland's Generals in the Second World War. Four Courts Press. ISBN 9781851828654.
- Maj R.H.W.S. Hastings, The Rifle Brigade in the Second World War 1939–1945, Aldershot: Gale & Polden, 1950/Uckfield: Naval & Military, 2004, ISBN 978-1-4745-3670-7.
- Lt-Col H.F. Joslen, Orders of Battle, United Kingdom and Colonial Formations and Units in the Second World War, 1939–1945, London: HM Stationery Office, 1960/London: London Stamp Exchange, 1990, ISBN 0-948130-03-2/Uckfield: Naval & Military Press, 2003, ISBN 1-843424-74-6.
