= Blair Stewart-Wilson =

Equerry, courtier (1929–2011)

Lieutenant-Colonel Sir Blair Aubyn Stewart-Wilson, KCVO (17 July 1929 – 24 May 2011), was equerry to Queen Elizabeth II and Deputy Master of the Household from 1976 to 1994.

== Early life ==
Born Blair Aubyn Wilson in Chelsea to Lieut. Aubyn Harold Raymond Wilson and his wife, Muriel Athelstan Hood Stewart.

In May 1934, his father died while living in Australia. His mother, who was lady laird of Balnakeilly, married secondly Major Charles Greville Bartlett Stevens, and took the name of Stewart-Stevens. Stewart-Wilson was educated at Sandroyd School and Eton College.

His older brother Ralph Stewart-Wilson (1923–2015) eventually succeeded their mother as laird of Balnakeilly in Perthshire.

== Career ==
A 19-year-old Stewart-Wilson joined the Scots Guards on 14 July 1949, and in 1952 was commissioned as a lieutenant into the Atholl Highlanders (the Duke of Atholl's private regiment). He served in the United Kingdom, the British Army of the Rhine (BAOR), and the Far East. From 1955 to 1957, he was adjutant of the 2nd Battalion of the Scots Guards, and then from 1957 to 1959 was aide-de-camp to the governor-general of New Zealand, Lord Cobham. In 1960–1962 he was equerry to the Duke of Gloucester. He was regimental adjutant from 1966 to 1968. He was staff qualified, but did not attend the Staff College, Camberley.

Stewart-Wilson was promoted lieutenant-colonel and was a general staff officer grade 1 (GSO1) in the foreign liaison section (Army) from 1970 to 1973, and Defence Military and air attaché in Vienna, 1975–1976. In 1976 he joined the Queen's Household. He retired from active military service on 17 July 1984. In his later years he was a supernumerary list officer.

From 1994 until his death he served as an extra equerry to H. M. the Queen.

He was HM's representative trustee on the board of the Royal Armouries from 1995 to 2004 and served as the Somerset County Patron for the charity Cancer Research UK from 1997 until his death.

== Personal life ==
In 1962, Stewart-Wilson married Helen Mary Fox; the couple had three daughters, including Belinda Anthea Stewart-Wilson.

== Honours ==
He was made a LVO in 1983, a CVO in 1989 and a KCVO in 1994. He received the General Service Medal, the Campaign Service Medal, Borneo and Malaya bars, and the Queen Elizabeth II Coronation Medal (1953).
