= Richard Fyffe =

British Army general

Lieutenant-General Sir Richard Fyffe KBE CB DSO MC
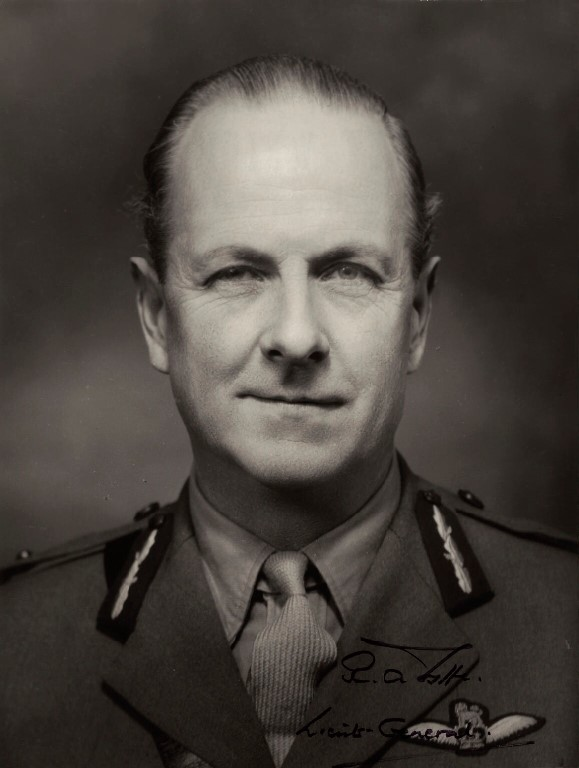
- Born: 12 August 1912
- Died: 24 December 1972 (aged 60)
- Military career
- Allegiance: United Kingdom
- Branch: British Army
- Service years: 1932–1971
- Rank: Lieutenant-General
- Service number: 53778
- Unit: Rifle Brigade (The Prince Consort's Own)
- Commands: 1st Battalion, Rifle Brigade (The Prince Consort's Own); 61st Lorried Infantry Brigade; 11th Infantry Brigade; Army Air Corps; 54th (East Anglian) Division/District
- Conflicts: World War II
- Awards: Knight Commander of the Order of the British Empire; Companion of the Order of the Bath; Distinguished Service Order; Military Cross

Lieutenant-General Sir Richard Alan Fyffe KBE CB DSO MC (12 August 1912 – 24 December 1972) was Deputy Chief of Defence Staff (Intelligence).

== Military career ==
Fyffe was commissioned into the Rifle Brigade (The Prince Consort's Own) in August 1932.

He served in World War II initially as a general staff officer and then with his regiment in North Africa and Italy. He earned his Military Cross as a company commander with 10th Battalion, Rifle Brigade (Tower Hamlets Rifles) in Tunisia in 1943. After a short period commanding a battalion of the Royal West Kent Regiment he returned to command 10th Rifle Brigade and later 2nd Rifle Brigade through the Italian Campaign. He temporarily commanded 61st Infantry Brigade early in 1945, and on 3 May 1945 he went blindfolded behind enemy lines to negotiate the surrender of a German corps. He was awarded the Distinguished Service Order at the end of the war.

After the War he joined the directing staff at the Staff College, Camberley before moving to General Headquarters, Far East Land Forces in 1947. He was appointed assistant adjutant general at the War Office in 1950 and then commanding officer of 1st Bn Rifle Brigade in 1953. He was made commander of 61st Lorried Infantry Brigade in 1955 and commander of 11th Infantry Brigade in 1956.

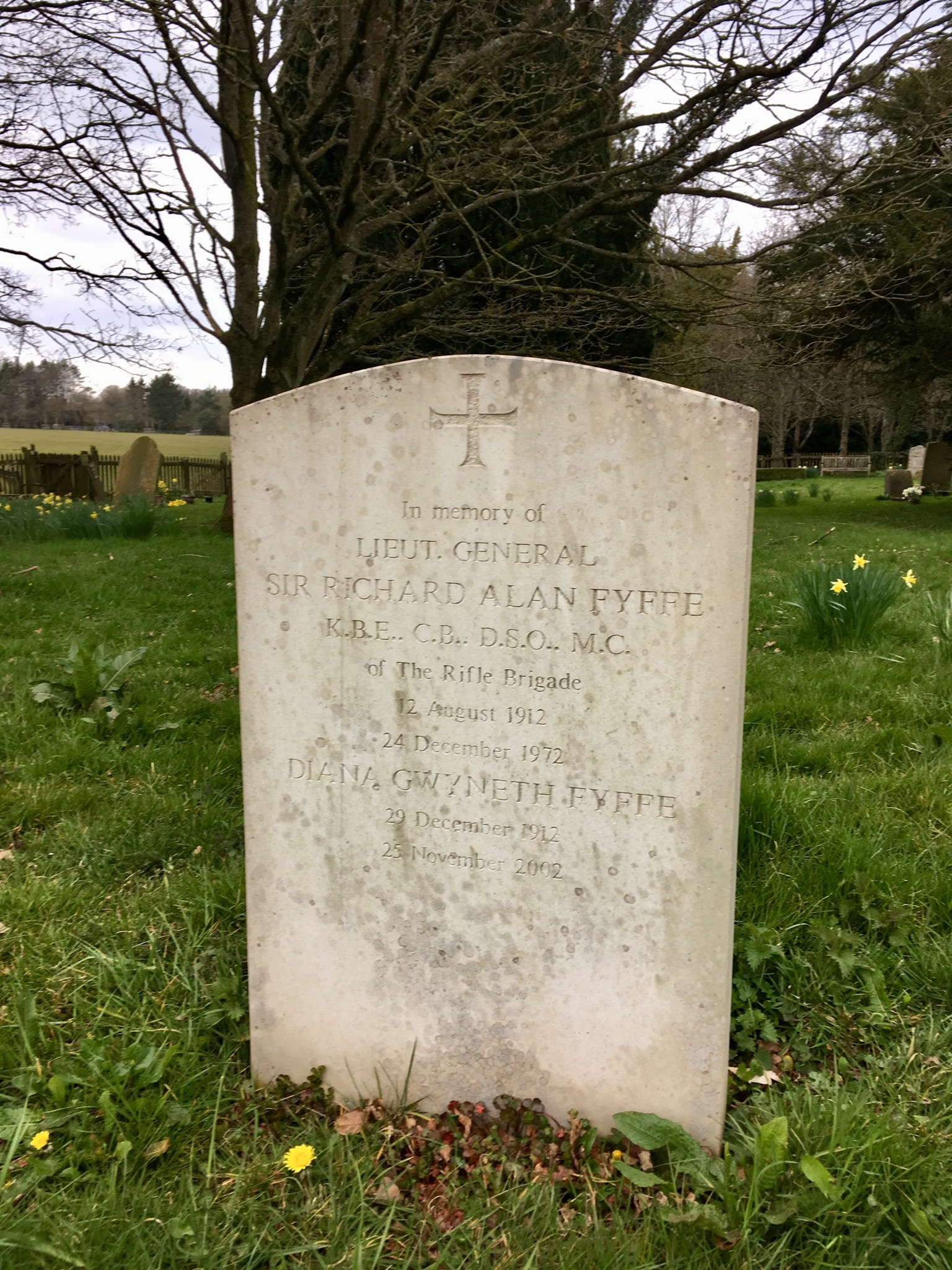
The gravestone of Richard and Diana Fyffe in the churchyard of St Mary Magdalene, Great Hampden, March 2020.

He was appointed deputy military secretary at the War Office in 1957 and brigadier commanding the Army Air Corps in 1960. He moved on to be director of public relations at the War Office in 1961 and general officer commanding 54th (East Anglian) Division/District of the Territorial Army (TA) in July 1963. He was made head of the British Army Staff at Washington D. C. in 1965.

He was appointed director of service intelligence in 1967 and deputy chief of defence staff (intelligence) at the Ministry of Defence in 1968; he retired in 1971.

== Notes ==
Military offices
Preceded by Ian Freeland	GOC 54th (East Anglian) Division/District; 1963–1965	Succeeded by Fergus Ling
Preceded by Sir Harold Maguire	Deputy Chief of Defence Staff (Intelligence); 1968–1971	Succeeded by Sir Louis Le Bailly
