= 6th Armoured Division (United Kingdom) =

Inactive British Army formation

- Formation Sign of the 6th Armoured Division.
- Active: 1940–1945; 1951–1958
- Country: United Kingdom
- Branch: British Army
- Type: Armoured Division
- Size: Second World War; 14,964 men 343 tanks (Note: 63 light tanks, 205 medium tanks, 24 close support tanks, 25 anti-aircraft tanks, and 8 artillery observation tanks.) (Note: These two figures are the war establishment, the paper strength of the division for 1944–1945; for information on how the division size changed over the war please see British Army during the Second World War and British Armoured formations of World War II.)
- Engagements: Tunisia Campaign; Italian Campaign

Commanders
- Notable commanders: Sir John Crocker; Herbert Lumsden; Charles Keightley; Sir Gerald Templer

Insignia
- Insignia: Mailed Fist

The 6th Armoured Division was an armoured division of the British Army, created in September 1940 during the Second World War and re-formed in May 1951 in the UK.

== History ==
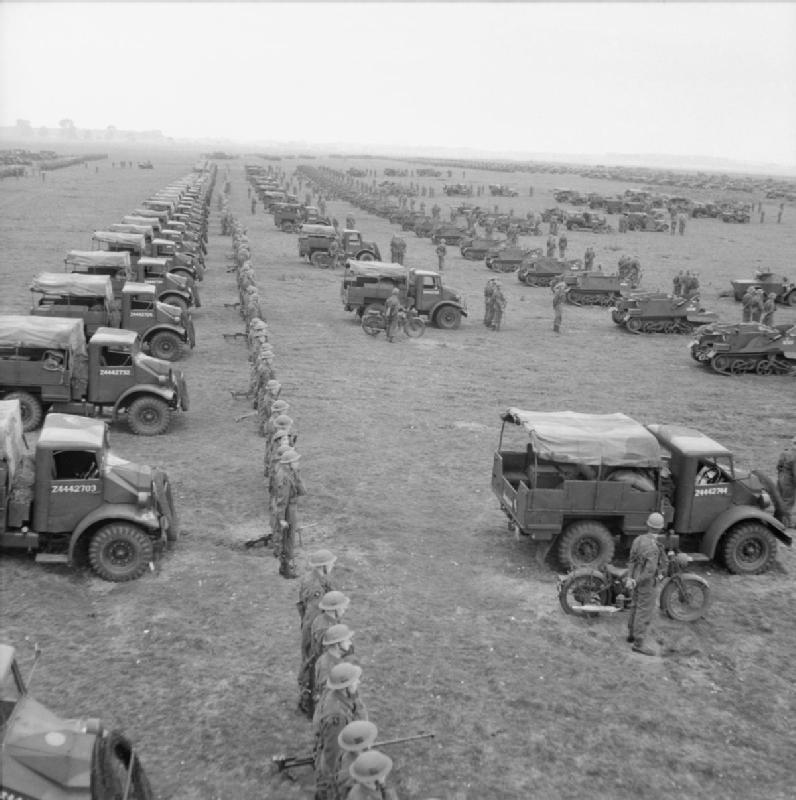
15-cwt trucks, carriers and motorcycles of a motor battalion in 6th Armoured Division, lined up for an inspection by the King near Brandon in Suffolk, 12 September 1941.

The division was formed in the United Kingdom under Northern Command on 12 September 1940, commanded by Major-General John Crocker, an officer of the Royal Tank Regiment who had recently fought in the Battle of France. The division initially had the 20th and 26th Armoured Brigades under command, as well as the 6th Support Group. In late April 1942, the 20th Armoured Brigade was transferred from the division and replaced by the 38th (Irish) Infantry Brigade and the 6th Support Group was disbanded in June. The 6th Armoured Division, now commanded by Major General Charles Keightley, taking over from Major General Charles Gairdner, soon began intensive training in preparation for service overseas.

In October 1940, armoured regiments within the Division, such as the 2nd Lothians and Border Horse, were supplied with Matilda MkI.I tanks, then in May 1942 Crusader MkII tanks, in August 1942 Valentine Mk.V tanks and in October Crusader MKIIIs. Subsequently the M4A2 Sherman medium tank was added to their inventory by March 1943. In November–December 1942 The division participated in the Operation Torch assault landings in Bone, closest to the Axis Forces in all the Torch landings that stretched from Morocco to the Tunisian border. In November 1942 they saw their first action as part of V Corps of the British First Army, First Allied Army in the Tunisia Campaign. In March 1943, around the same time when most of the units had been supplied with American M4A2 Shermans, the 6th Division came under IX Corps. After Tunisia, the Division participated in the Italian Campaign as part of the British Eighth Army and ended the war in Austria, again under the command of V Corps.

=== Kasserine ===
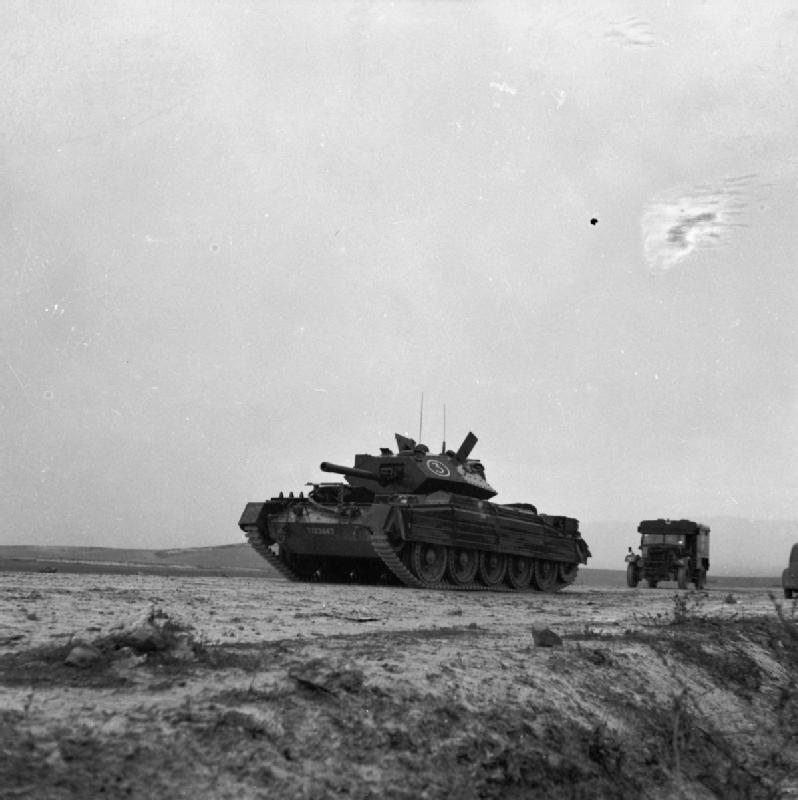
Crusader III tank of the 17th/21st Lancers on a road near Bou Arada, Tunisia, 13 January 1943.

On 30 January 1943, the German 21st Panzer Division (veterans of the Afrika Korps under Generalfeldmarschall Erwin Rommel) and three Italian divisions met elements of the French forces near Faïd, the main pass from the eastern arm of the mountains into the coastal plains. The French were overrun and two US units near them were surrounded.

On 19 February 1943, Rommel launched what would become the Battle of Kasserine Pass. After two days of advances through the American defences, the Afrika Korps and the Italians had suffered few casualties, while the American forces lost a significant number of men and two-thirds of their tanks. During the battle the Italian 131st Centauro Armoured Division captured more than 3,000 American soldiers. On the night of 21 February 1943, the 6th Armoured and 46th Infantry Divisions, arrived to bolster the American defence, having been pulled from the British lines facing the Germans at Sbiba. Counter-attacks by Italian troops were also ordered on the British and Americans. Two battalions of experienced Bersaglieri soldiers are recorded by the 23rd Field Regiment, Royal Artillery as having made a daylight counter-attack through the Ousseltia Plain, which was repelled. Next day opened with another German counter-attack against the Americans, until the arrival of four US artillery battalions made offensive operations difficult.

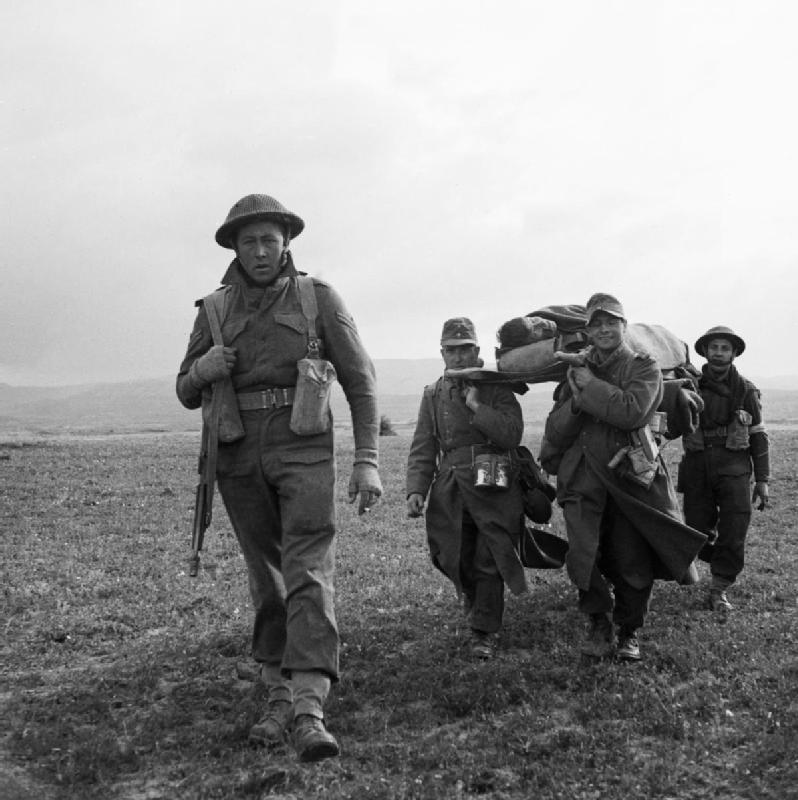
German prisoners of war (POWs) carry a wounded British soldier during the 6th Armoured Division's attack on the town of Pichon in Tunisia, 8 April 1943.

Faced with stiffening defences and the news that the Eighth Army had reached Medenine, only a few kilometres from the Mareth Line, Rommel decided to call off the attack and withdraw on the night of 22 February 1943 to support the Mareth defences, hoping that the Kasserine attack had caused enough damage to deter any offensive action from the west for the moment. The Axis forces from Kasserine reached the Mareth line on 25 February. It was after the battle of Kasserine Pass that the 6th Armoured Division was reorganised and equipped with the M4 Sherman tank. In March 1943 the division was assigned to the recently arrived IX Corps (Lieutenant-General John Crocker) the former first GOC of the division, who was later wounded in a training accident and replaced by Lieutenant-General Brian Horrocks. The division was the spearhead of the final assault by the First Army in May 1943, breaking through to Tunis. The division went on to take the surrender of the famous 90th Light Division and participated in the round up and capitulation of all Axis forces in North Africa in May 1943.

=== Italy ===
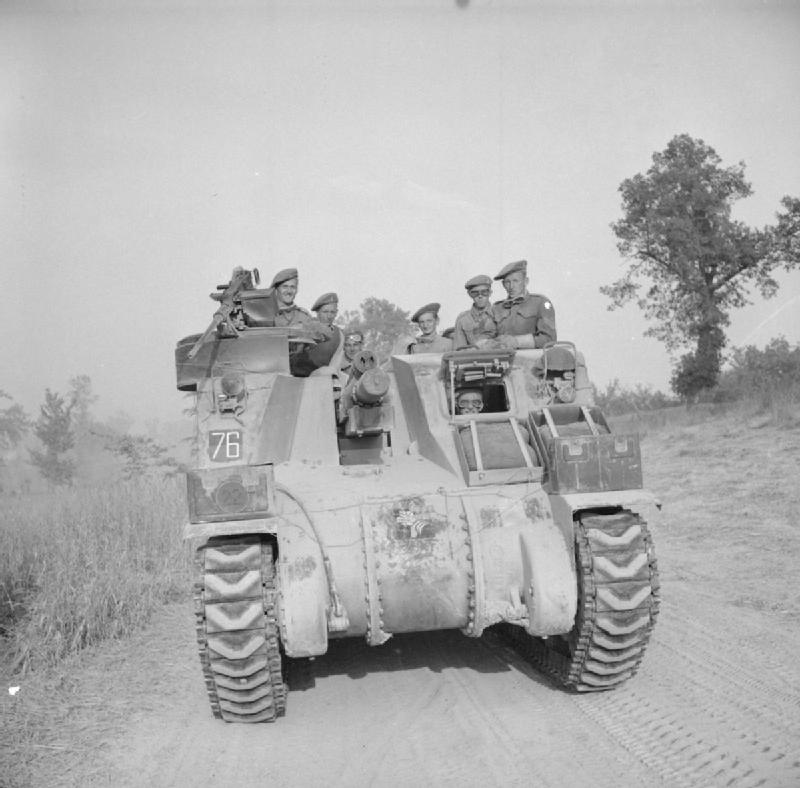
Priest 105 mm self-propelled gun of 12th Royal Horse Artillery (Honourable Artillery Company), 6th Armoured Division, 17 May 1944.

In Italy there was no more mobile warfare in wide open spaces. The division would spend much of its time supporting the infantry as the Allies came across defensive line after defensive line. The 6th Armoured Division, now under Major General Gerald Templer (replaced by Major General Horatius Murray after Templer was injured in early August), was now part of XIII Corps, which had been assigned to the US Fifth Army (Lieutenant General Mark W. Clark) to form its right flank and fight in the high Apennine Mountains during Operation Olive in August and September 1944. The Gothic Line (Linea Gotica) formed Generalfeldmarschall Albert Kesselring's last major line of defence in the final stages of the Second World War during the fighting retreat of the German forces in Italy. The 6th Armoured Division captured the San Godenzo Pass on Route 67 to Forlì on 18 September.

=== Spring 1945 Offensive ===
By 19 April, the Argenta Gap had been forced and the 6th Armoured Division was released through the left wing of the advancing 78th Infantry Division, to swing left to race north-west along the line of the river Reno to Bondeno and link up with units of the Fifth Army advancing north from west of Bologna, to complete the encirclement of the German divisions defending Bologna. On all fronts the German defence continued to be determined and effective but Bondeno was captured on 23 April. The 6th Armoured Division linked with the US 10th Mountain Division (IV US Corps) the next day at Finale. The IV US Corps had broken through onto the plains on 19 April, bypassing Bologna on their right. Bologna was entered by the Poles advancing up the line of Route 9 on 21 April, followed two hours later by the II US Corps from the south.

== Post-war ==
The division moved to the Trieste area, at the time within the boundary of the Kingdom of Italy. In July 1946, the division was renamed the 1st Armoured Division and the mailed fist was retained. During 1947, the now 1st Armoured Division was transferred to Palestine and was disbanded in September 1947. A new 6th Armoured Division was formed in May 1951 in the UK and later assigned to the British Army of the Rhine in Germany. It consisted of the 20th Armoured Brigade and 61st Lorried Infantry Brigade. It was disbanded in June 1958.

== General Officer Commanding ==
| Appointed | General Officer Commanding |
| 27 September 1940 | Major-General John Crocker |
| 9 January 1941 | Brigadier Evelyn Fanshawe (acting) |
| 22 February 1941 | Major-General John Crocker |
| 15 October 1941 | Major-General Herbert Lumsden |
| 29 October 1941 | Major-General Charles Gairdner |
| 19 May 1942 | Major-General Charles Keightley |
| 19 December 1943 | Major-General Vyvyan Evelegh |
| 15 February 1944 | Brigadier William Edward Gordon Hemming (acting) |
| 19 March 1944 | Major-General Vyvyan Evelegh |
| 24 July 1944 | Major-General Gerald Templer (wounded 5 August 1944) |
| 5 August 1944 | Brigadier C.A.M.D. Scott (acting) |
| 13 August 1944 | Brigadier Francis Mitchell (acting) |
| 21 August 1944 | Major-General Horatius Murray |
| 27 July 1945 | Brigadier Adrian Gore |
| January 1946 | Major-General Charles Loewen |
| October 1953 | Major-General Francis Mitchell |
| 1955 | Major-General Roderick McLeod |
| 1957 | Major-General Denis O'Connor |

== Order of battle ==
6th UK Armoured Division, 1944-1945.

6th Armoured Division was constituted as follows during the war:

20th Armoured Brigade (from 16 October 1940, left 23 April 1942)

- 1st Royal Gloucestershire Hussars
- 1st Northamptonshire Yeomanry
- 2nd Northamptonshire Yeomanry
- 2nd Battalion, The Rangers (became 10th Battalion, King's Royal Rifle Corps 21 March 1941)

26th Armoured Brigade (from 9 November 1940)

- 16th/5th Lancers (detached 9 January 1944, rejoined 29 March 1944)
- 17th/21st Lancers
- 2nd Lothians and Border Horse (left 17 July 1945)
- 4th Queen's Own Hussars (from 28 July 1945)
- 2nd Battalion, Tower Hamlets Rifles (from 16 October 1940, became 10th Battalion, Rifle Brigade (Tower Hamlets Rifles) 15 January 1941, left 29 May 1944)
- 1st Battalion, King's Royal Rifle Corps (from 22 July 1945)

6th Support Group (from 1 November 1940, disbanded 1 June 1942)

- 12th Regiment, Royal Horse Artillery (Honourable Artillery Company) (left 31 May 1942)
- 72nd Anti-Tank Regiment, Royal Artillery (left 31 May 1942)
- 51st Light Anti-Aircraft Regiment, Royal Artillery (left 31 May 1942)
- 9th Battalion, Queen's Own Royal West Kent Regiment (left 24 April 1942)

38th (Irish) Infantry Brigade (from 9 June 1942, left 16 February 1943)

- 2nd Battalion, London Irish Rifles
- 1st Battalion, Royal Irish Fusiliers
- 6th Battalion, Royal Inniskilling Fusiliers

1st Guards Brigade (from 24 March 1943, left 29 May 1944)

- 3rd Battalion, Grenadier Guards
- 2nd Battalion, Coldstream Guards
- 3rd Battalion, Welsh Guards

61st Infantry Brigade (from 29 May 1944)

- 2nd Battalion, Rifle Brigade (Prince Consort's Own)
- 7th Battalion, Rifle Brigade (London Rifle Brigade)
- 10th Battalion, Rifle Brigade (Tower Hamlets Rifles) (from 30 May 1944, disbanded 20 March 1945)
- 1st Battalion, King's Royal Rifle Corps (from 8 March 1945, left 22 July 1945)
- 1st Battalion, Welch Regiment (from 29 June 1945)
- 2nd Battalion, Queen's Own Cameron Highlanders (from 19 July 1945)
- 1st Battalion, Royal Sussex Regiment (from 19 July 1945)

Divisional Troops

- 1st Derbyshire Yeomanry (Reconnaissance Regiment, from 10 November 1940)
- 12th Regiment, Royal Horse Artillery (Honourable Artillery Company)
- 152nd (Ayrshire Yeomanry) Field Regiment, Royal Artillery
- 72nd Anti-Tank Regiment, Royal Artillery
- 51st Light Anti-Aircraft Regiment, Royal Artillery
- 5th Field Squadron, Royal Engineers (from 19 November 1940, left 6 March 1944)
- 8th Field Squadron, Royal Engineers (from 15 December 1940)
- 625th Field Squadron, Royal Engineers (from 7 March 1944)
- 144th Field Park Squadron, Royal Engineers (from 19 November 1940)
- 6th Bridging Troop, Royal Engineers (from 25 December 1943, left 21 August 1945)
- 6th Armoured Divisional Signals Regiment, Royal Corps of Signals

=== Brigade Attachments ===
The following brigades were, at various points in time, attached to the 6th Armoured Division.

- 36th Infantry Brigade
- 201st Guards Motor Brigade
- 24th Guards Brigade
- 21st Indian Infantry Brigade

== See also ==
- List of British divisions in World War II
- British Armoured formations of World War II
