= James Kilvington Cochrane =

British Army general (1873–1948)

Brigadier-General James Kilvington Cochrane CMG
- Born: 2 July 1873
- Died: 29 December 1948 (aged 75); Bath, Somerset
- Military career
- Allegiance: United Kingdom
- Branch: British Army
- Service years: 1893–1920
- Rank: Brigadier-General
- Unit: Prince of Wales's Leinster Regiment (Royal Canadians)
- Commands: 61st Infantry Brigade
- Conflicts: First World War
- Awards: Companion of the Order of St Michael and St George

Brigadier-General James Kilvington Cochrane, CMG (2 July 1873 – 29 December 1948) was a senior British Army officer during the First World War.

== Biography ==
Born in 1873, James Kilvington Cochrane was educated at Bedford School and at the Royal Military College, Sandhurst. He received his first commission as a second lieutenant in the Prince of Wales's Leinster Regiment (Royal Canadians) in 1893, and was promoted to lieutenant on 6 October 1894, and to captain on 5 July 1899. He was seconded to the Northern Nigeria Regiment in the West African Frontier Force, and served during the expedition against the Bida and Kontagora Emirate in 1901. The following year he was appointed resident at Gujba, when a British garrison was established in Lower Borno. He served during the First World War, between 1914 and 1918, commanding the 61st Infantry Brigade.

Brigadier General Cochrane was invested as a Companion of the Order of St Michael and St George in 1919. He retired from the British Army in 1920 and died in Bath, Somerset, on 29 December 1948, aged 75.
