= British armoured formations of the Second World War =

During the Second World War the British Army deployed armoured divisions and independent armoured and tank brigades.

== Background ==
During the interwar period, the British Army examined the lessons of the First World War; a need was seen for experimentation with and development of theories of manoeuvre and armoured warfare, as well as the creation of the short-lived Experimental Mechanized Force. The long-term impact was for the army to move towards mechanisation, to enhance battlefield mobility. By the 1930s, the army had established three types of divisions: the infantry division, the mobile division (later called an armoured division), and the motor division (a motorised infantry division). The primary role of the infantry division was to penetrate the enemy's defensive line, with the support of infantry tanks. Any gap created would then be exploited by mobile divisions, and the territory thus captured would be secured by the fast-moving motor divisions. These tactics would transform the attack into a break-through, while maintaining mobility. The country's first armoured division, the Mobile Division, was created in October 1937.

In the 1930s, tensions increased between Germany and the United Kingdom. During 1937 and 1938, German demands for the annexation of the Sudetenland in Czechoslovakia led to an international crisis. This was resolved in September 1938 by the Munich Agreement, which allowed for German annexation of Sudetenland. The Mobile Division (Egypt) was formed. Tensions did not subside, and the British government debated how best to prepare the army for war. In January 1939, the Secretary of State for War Leslie Hore-Belisha proposed splitting the Mobile Division into two smaller formations but found no support for this move. The issue was broached again a month later, and was accepted in principle by the cabinet. Shortly after, France was informed of a preliminary timetable for the arrival of the British Expeditionary Force (BEF) in the event of war: "One Regular Armoured Division will become available about the middle of 1940, the second would not be available 'till a later date'". The formation of a second division within the United Kingdom was complicated by the slow pace of British tank production. Several independent Army Tank Brigades were also raised prior to the outbreak of the war, to be commanded by corps. In line with the established doctrine, they would be allocated to support infantry divisions as the need arose.

British doctrine defined light tanks as reconnaissance vehicles armed only with machine guns. Cruiser tanks were swift moving, more heavily armoured, and equipped with a machine gun and an anti-tank gun. The primary role of the cruiser tank was to engage and destroy opposing armoured forces. Its main weapon, a 2-pounder anti-tank gun, was only supplied with armour-piercing rounds. This meant that cruiser tanks were ineffective against entrenched infantry, or in suppressing hostile artillery. Infantry tanks, slower moving and more heavily armoured, were intended to be solely used within tank brigades to support infantry formations.

== Armoured divisions ==
=== Formation ===
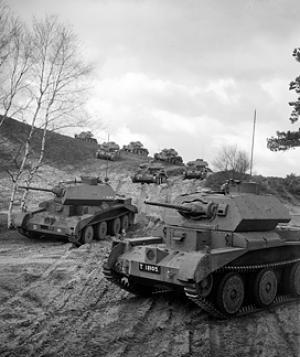
Cruiser Mk IVA tanks of the 1st Armoured Division on exercise during 1941.

At the start of the Second World War, in September 1939, the British Army possessed two armoured divisions; one in Britain and a second in Egypt. (Note: The Mobile Division was renamed the 1st Armoured Division in April 1939. The Mobile Division (Egypt) was renamed the Armoured Division (Egypt) on the outbreak of the war, and then the 7th Armoured Division on 16 February 1940.) On 15 December 1939, the 2nd Armoured Division was established in Britain. Despite being formed, it had no fighting sub-units until the following month, when an independent armoured brigade and elements of the 1st Armoured Division were transferred to it. The 3rd Armoured Division also began to form and several armoured regiments were earmarked to join it. Early war tank production went to formations in France or in Egypt resulting in little availability at home. With the British Army defeated in France and evacuated from Dunkirk, these units were equipped with a motley of armoured cars (improvised and factory built) and assigned to an armoured car brigade called a Motor Machine Gun brigade.

Following the Allied defeat during the Battle of France, in 1940, new tank production orders were placed. The Army recognised that German armoured success during the fighting had come about as a result of the concentration of tanks in divisions. The Army intended to raise another seven armoured divisions by mid 1941. This resulted in the 6th, the 8th, and the 9th Armoured Divisions being formed over the final months of 1940. This was followed in 1941 by the 11th and the Guards Armoured Division. These new divisions were supplemented by the 42nd (East Lancashire) Infantry Division being converted into the 42nd Armoured Division. In Palestine, the 1st Cavalry Division was reorganised as an armoured formation and renamed the 10th Armoured Division. Another armoured division, beyond the initial request for seven more formations, was formed in 1942. The 79th Armoured Division was short-lived as a traditional armoured division, and in April 1943 was assigned to the development and use of Hobart's Funnies (specialised tanks). In this capacity, it did not act en masse, it maintained command and administrative control of its sub-units, they were assigned to other formations to provide specialised support as and when.

In addition, the 5th Armoured Division was notionally created in the United Kingdom in 1944-45 as a military deception scheme, part of Operation Fortitude#Fortitude South II.

=== Structure ===
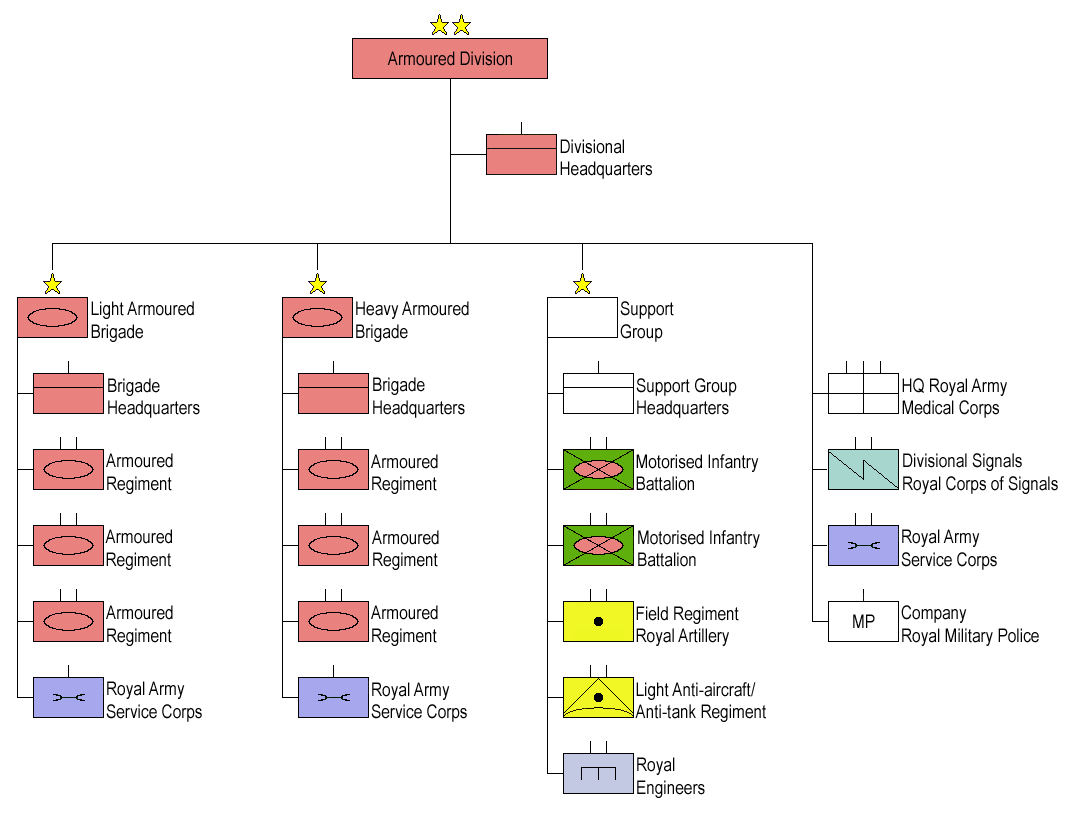
The organisational structure of the armoured divisions in 1939.

Between May 1939 and May 1945, there were nine changes in the organisation of the divisions. When first formed, the Mobile Division had six light tank regiments in two cavalry brigades and a tank brigade of three medium regiments. The division was supported by a Pivot Group of two motorised infantry battalions and two artillery regiments. Mobile Division (Egypt) consisted of a light armoured brigade, a cavalry brigade, a heavy armoured group of two Royal Tank Regiments and a Pivot Group. On 25 May 1939, the Army decided that the organisation should change to an armoured division of a light and a heavy armoured brigade, each of three armoured regiments, totalling 349 tanks; 159 light cruisers, 108 light tanks, 58 heavy cruisers and 24 close support tanks. The two armoured brigades would have a Support Group that contained the divisional field artillery regiment, a mixed light anti-aircraft–anti-tank regiment, two motorised infantry battalions and the division's engineers. The support group provided whatever support the armoured brigades needed, being able to provide motorised infantry, field artillery, anti-tank artillery or light anti-aircraft artillery as needed.

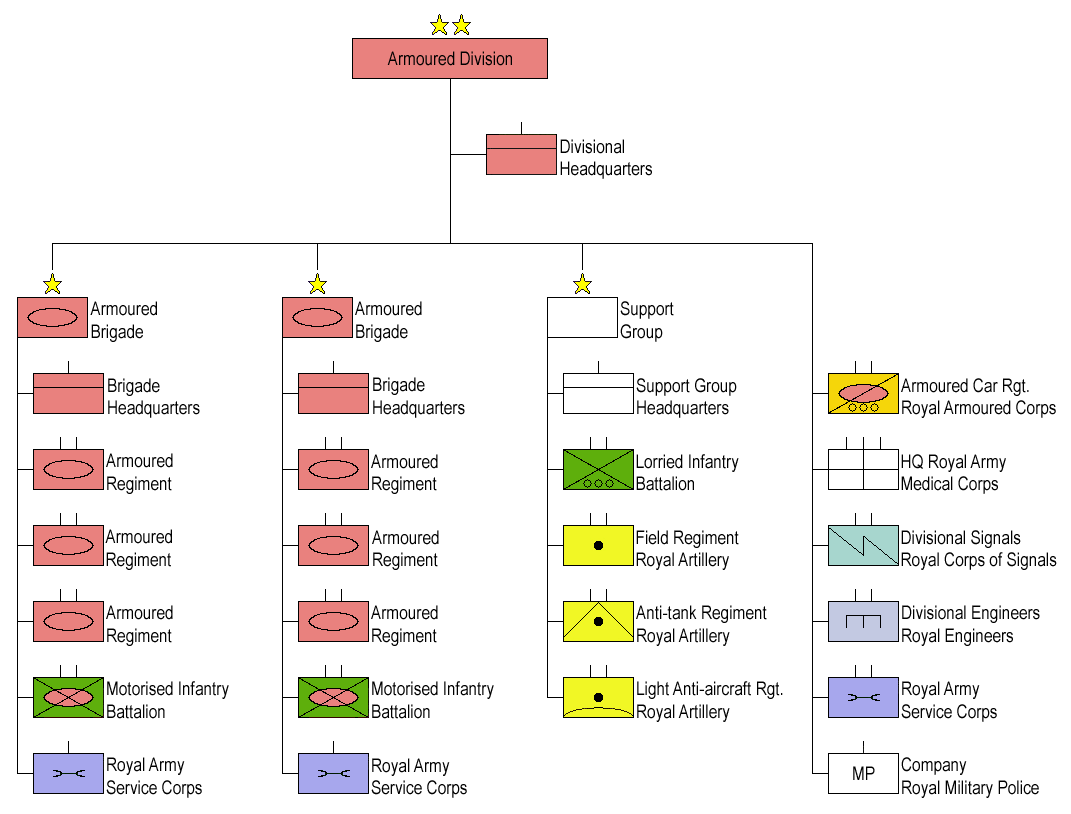
The organisational structure of the armoured divisions in 1940.

The next change (on paper) was made in April 1940; the tank strength of the division was reduced to 340 tanks by changes in the armoured regiments, the two armoured brigades now became homogeneous, dropping their prefixes and the division's engineers were removed from the Support Group, becoming divisional troops under their own headquarters. Following the Battle of France, the Army realised that mixing light and cruiser tanks in the same brigade had been a mistake and that there were insufficient infantry and support units within the division. In October, the Support Group's motorised infantry battalions were transferred to the armoured brigades, each receiving one, while the Support Group was given a lorried infantry battalion, increasing the infantry strength of the division to three battalions. The mixed anti-aircraft–anti tank regiment was replaced by two specialised regiments. More engineers were added to the division. In Britain, an armoured car regiment was placed under the command of the division but not in the Middle East. While these theoretical changes were made, they did not reflect the armoured divisions' composition; in July, the 7th Armoured Division only had 65 cruiser tanks, lacking spare parts (some even lacking proper armament) while the division was operating two armoured regiments in each of its brigades. In January 1941, the 1st Armoured Division, the best equipped armoured division in Britain, was 30 per cent below its tank establishment and was equipped with many obsolescent light tanks.

In 1942, the British Army decided that an infantry brigade was needed in each division and on 27 February 1942 the next change was made for divisions operating in the Middle East; an armoured brigade would be replaced by an infantry brigade. The Support Group would be disbanded and a armoured car regiment would be added to the division. For tactical reasons, the battle formation in the Middle East became the Brigade Group, the division would now operate two brigade groups. The armoured brigade group would have three armoured regiments, a motor battalion, an artillery regiment (including an anti-tank battery of 16 guns; either 2-pounders or 6-pounders) as well as its three batteries of 25-pounder gun-howitzers, a light anti-aircraft battery of 18 guns, a field squadron of Royal Engineers and various other administration units. The infantry brigade group would consist of three motorised infantry battalions, an artillery regiment also with an integrated anti-tank battery, a light anti-aircraft battery, Royal Engineers and administration units. The divisional headquarters was given more staff and signal units and a headquarters was formed to control the artillery. Due to some armoured regiments being re-equipped with American tanks, the establishment of the division could vary between 130 and 150 tanks. In the United Kingdom, the brigade group was not adopted but the support group was abolished and an infantry brigade was added to the division to replace the second armoured brigade. The two artillery regiments, the anti-tank regiment and light anti-tank regiment were placed under the command of an artillery headquarters unit and additional administration units were attached to the division. Further changes were made to the armoured regiments and anti-aircraft tanks were incorporated into the division bringing the established strength to 227 tanks; 26 anti-aircraft tanks, 18 close support tanks and 183 cruiser tanks.

Prior to the Battle of Alam el Halfa, in August–September 1942, the armoured divisions in North Africa were again authorised to change; the armoured division became the basic battle formation again and the brigade groups were reorganised as they had previously. The artillery, anti-tank and anti-aircraft regiments would be put under the control of the Royal Artillery divisional headquarters and would be reinforced with additional batteries, the Royal Engineers would be reinforced and returned to the divisional engineer headquarters. The divisional tank establishment was increased to 186 and anti-aircraft tanks were also allocated to the division.

In April 1943, the armoured car regiment was removed from the division and replaced with an armoured reconnaissance regiment. Additional troops were allocated to the infantry brigade. The artillery regiments were also reorganised, one would now be equipped with self-propelled guns while the other would keep towed guns. The tank establishment was increased to 278 tanks; 214 cruisers, 34 anti-aircraft tanks and 30 close support tanks. In Britain, the 7th Armoured Division was re-equipped with Cromwell tanks, the only division to use them as their main battle tank, the others used M4 Sherman tanks. The Cromwell was used also by the armoured reconnaissance regiments of the 7th, 11th and Guards Armoured Divisions.

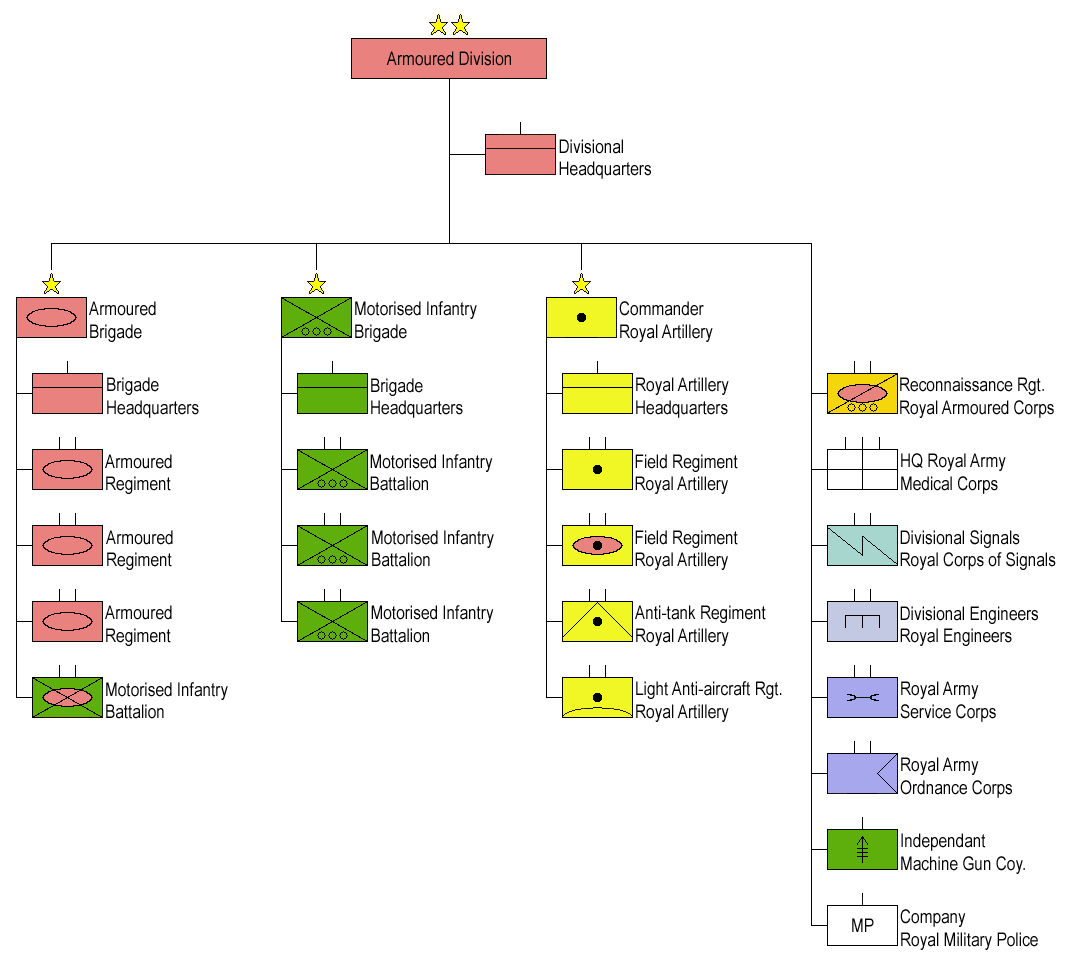
The organisational structure of British armoured divisions in 1944.

During March 1944, further amendments were made; the additional troops allocated to the infantry brigade the year before were removed while, for the divisions allocated to the 21st Army Group, an independent machine gun company was allocated to the division. Various changes were made to the armoured and armoured reconnaissance regiments, increasing the tank establishment of the division to 343 tanks; 223 cruisers, 25 anti-aircraft tanks, 24 close support tanks, 63 light tanks, and 8 Observation tanks. (Note: Artillery Observation Post (OP) tanks belonged to the division's artillery regiments. Some had their main guns replaced with a dummy gun to allow additional radio equipment and a map table to be installed.) The self-propelled artillery regiment consisted of twenty-four 25-pounder self-propelled guns, the anti-tank regiment consisted of forty-eight 6-pounder or 17-pounder guns, and the light anti-aircraft regiment consisted of 54 Bofors 40 mm guns.

During the Battle of Normandy, the 7th Armoured Division instituted a flexible structure prior to the Battle of Villers-Bocage in early June 1944. Similar structures were adopted by the other armoured divisions until after Operation Goodwood, when Lieutenant-General Richard O’Connor ordered the Guards and 11th Armoured Divisions to organise themselves similarly. The divisions operated from then on as two brigade groups; each of two combined arms teams, both made up of one tank regiment and one infantry battalion, the armoured reconnaissance regiment was matched with the armoured brigade's motor battalion to provide the fourth group.

The armoured divisions (including the 6th South African Armoured Division) serving in Italy, where the terrain was less favourable for tanks, usually had extra infantry assigned or attached. During the Spring 1945 offensive in Italy for example, in the 6th Armoured Division the armoured regiments of the 26th Armoured Brigade formed combined arms teams with the motor infantry battalions of the 61st Infantry Brigade in the manner of armoured divisions in north west Europe and the division was also assigned the lorried 1st Guards Brigade. The final change came in February 1945 but was not implemented until May 1945, after the war in Europe; armoured divisions would retain the organisation approved in March 1944 but the armoured reconnaissance regiment would be converted into a fourth armoured regiment not in either brigade. The tank establishment was also lowered to 338 tanks; 234 cruisers, 44 light tanks, 28 anti-aircraft tanks and 9 observation tanks.

In 1939, the armoured division comprised 9,442 men all ranks, this increased to 14,964 men all ranks by 1944; of this latter figure, the division had a combat strength of around 7,000 men with only 3,400 of these men being in the division's nine rifle companies compared to a combat strength of around 5,000 men in the American armoured division, of which 3,000 were in the rifle companies. This resulted in a numerical inferiority to the number of infantry available in Waffen-SS panzer divisions; the 1st and 12th SS Panzer Divisions, at the beginning of June 1944, were around 20,000 men strong, with a combat strength of around 12,000 men, of which about 7,000 men were based within the 24 infantry companies. In 1944, the British armoured division could field more medium tanks than the 186 tanks of the German panzer division or the 168 medium tanks of an American armoured division (251 tanks in total).

=== Role and tactics ===
The doctrine of the British Army in 1938 was for Army Tank Brigades, attached as Corps troops, to work with the Infantry divisions and break into the enemy defensive positions. The Mobile Division, supported Territorial Army Motor divisions each of two motorised infantry brigades supported by two artillery regiments but no tanks, was to then to create a breakthrough. Initially, the mechanised cavalry regiments of the division, were reconnaissance, not fighting formations. The motorised infantry, according to John Burnett-Stuart on 8 September 1937, was not meant to fight side by side with the tanks; they were to protect them during resting and replenishing periods.

=== Analysis ===
The historian David French wrote that the Army's intention had been to create balanced all-arms formations but following the formation of their first armoured divisions, they had instead created tank-heavy divisions with too few infantry or supporting arms. He wrote that the reforms that took place in 1940 forfeited an opportunity to transform the tank-heavy armoured divisions into a balanced all-arms force.

== Armoured Brigade and regiment structure ==
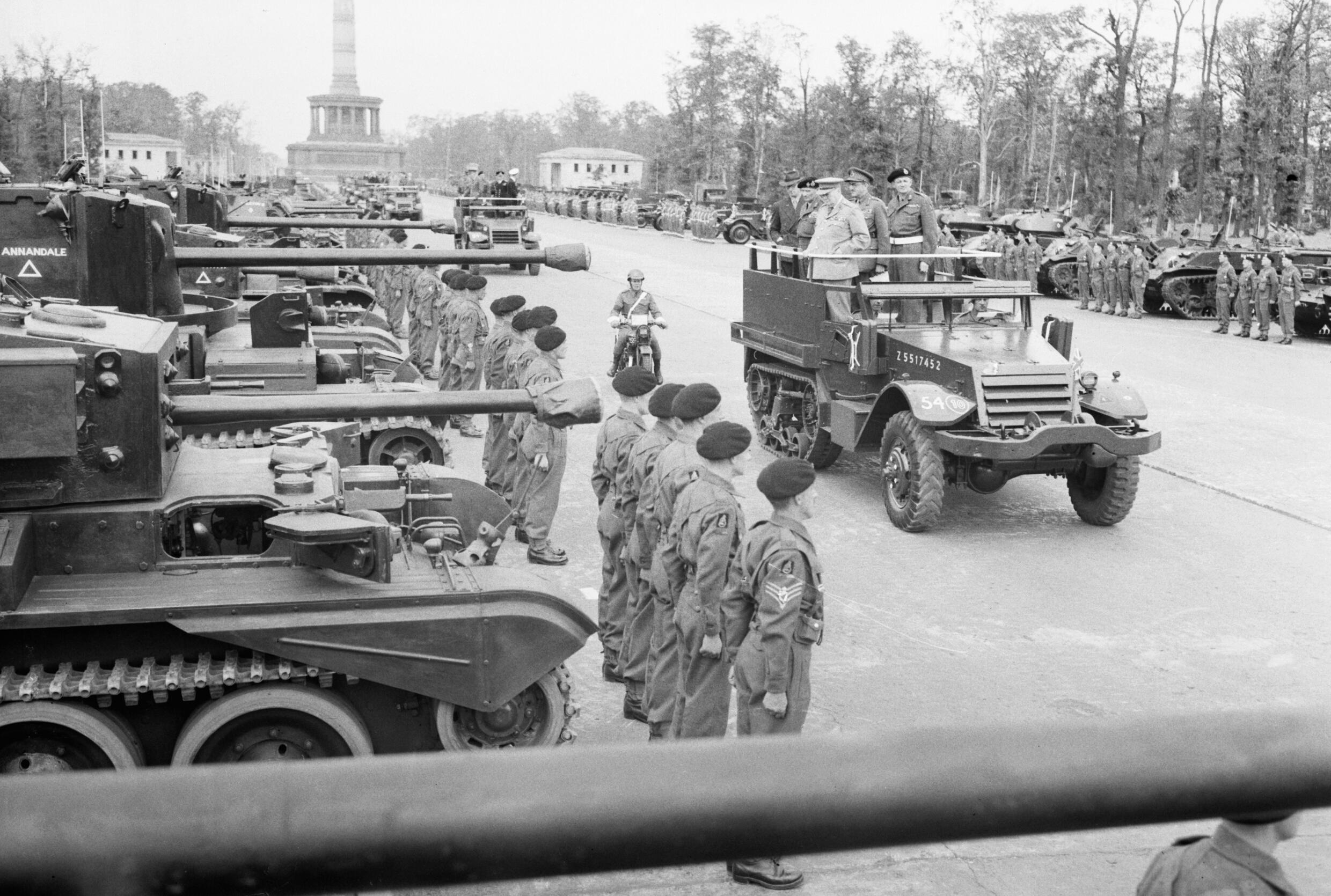
Churchill, accompanied by Field Marshals Alan Brooke and Bernard Montgomery, inspects the 7th Armoured Division during the Berlin Victory Parade on 21 July 1945.

Like the division, the armoured brigade went through nine changes to its basic organisation, while the tank brigade went through four changes before a complete conversion of its role. The structural changes did not mean the brigades conformed to each paper reorganisation and the actual changes sometimes took place prior or after their authorisation. The two basic armoured brigades at the start of the war were the light armoured brigade and the heavy armoured brigade. The light armoured brigade was to be composed of three light armoured regiments each consisting of 22 light cruisers, 36 light tanks, 24 officers, and 492 other ranks. The brigade headquarters had six light cruisers and four heavy cruisers allocated to it, while each regimental headquarters had four light cruisers. The three sabre squadrons of each regiment consisted of two light tank squadrons, made up of five troops of three tanks and a squadron headquarters of three tanks, and one light cruiser squadron, made up of five troops of three light cruisers, and a squadron headquarters of three tanks.

The heavy armoured brigade, laid out the same as the light armoured brigade, had 157 tanks, with each regiment made up of 26 light cruisers, 15 heavy cruisers, 8 close support tanks, 30 officers and 573 other ranks. Each regiment contained a headquarters with two light cruisers and two close support tanks, three squadrons each made up of a squadron headquarters, of one light cruiser and two close support tanks, a light squadron, with three troops of two light cruisers with a squadron headquarters of one light cruiser, and a heavy squadron, of two troops of two heavy cruisers, and squadron headquarters of one heavy cruiser.

In May 1940, the armoured brigades became homogeneous and were reorganised; all now would contain 10 cruisers within the brigade headquarters, while the regimental headquarters would have four cruisers. Each regimental headquarters would control a headquarters squadron and three sabre squadrons; each of which consisted of a squadron headquarters, with two cruisers and two close support tanks, and four troops each comprising three cruisers. In total, each regiment would consist of 46 cruisers and 8 close support tanks, 31 officers and 546 other ranks, with the brigade being able to muster 166 tanks. The October 1940 authorised changes allocated an infantry battalion to the brigade, but made no other changes.

The early 1942 Brigade Groups have already been described; however, the regiments were organised on two bases: those equipped with American tanks and those equipped with a mixture of American and British. The American equipped regiments, totalling 44 tanks, were organised as such: four M3 Stuarts allocated to the regimental headquarters, which controlled three sabre squadrons; one squadron of four troops of four Stuarts and a headquarters with a further four Stuarts, and two squadrons composed of M3 Grants each consisting of three troops of three tanks and a squadron headquarters of a further three Grants. The mixed regiments were laid out the same except with one squadron made up of Grants and two squadrons made up of Crusader tanks bringing the total to 48 tanks; 36 Crusaders, and 12 Grants. The changes in late 1942 reverted the structure of the brigade and regiments to their 1941 layout, but also increased the regiment to 52 tanks, 4 anti-aircraft tanks, 54 officers and 600 other ranks. The regiments were to be equipped with M4 Shermans as they became available. The brigade headquarters would now only have 8 tanks allocated to it, while the regimental headquarters remained the same, but they were each given four anti-aircraft tanks. In the United Kingdom and the 6th Armoured Division, two additional troops were attached to each Sabre Squadron along with eight anti-aircraft tanks being attached to the regimental headquarters, bringing the regiment's strength up to 55 cruisers, 6 close support tanks, 8 anti-aircraft tanks, 36 officers and 644 other ranks.

The November 1943 organisation removed a number of anti-aircraft tanks from each regiment and added a reconnaissance troop to the regiment bringing its strength to 55 cruisers, 6 close support tanks, 11 light cruisers and 6 anti-aircraft tanks. Each regiment would be manned by 37 officers and 655 other ranks. By June 1944, the sabre squadrons in North West Europe were operating four-tank troops. All Sherman equipped units, including the 7th Armoured Division's sabre squadrons but excluding the Armoured Reconnaissance Regiments, were equipped with Sherman Fireflys; 36 were generally provided to each brigade, enough to equip each troop with one. Later in the campaign, as more Fireflys became available, the troops were issued with two. The final change to the brigade and regiment was authorised on 18 January 1945, but was not implemented till May; it was to standardise all armour and tank brigades and regiments. No changes were made to the layout of the regiments; however, three tanks were removed from the brigade headquarters, two anti-aircraft tanks would be added and eight Observation Post tanks would also be allocated to the brigade.

== Tank Brigades ==
The initial April 1938 Tank Brigade establishment was for the brigade to muster 175 tanks; each of its three battalions comprising 57 tanks, 29 officers, and 484 other ranks. The brigade headquarters would contain four tanks but could vary depending on the situation, while the battalion headquarters would contain two infantry tanks and four light tanks. Under the command of the battalion was three companies; each consisting of a headquarters, issued with one infantry tank and one light tank, and five sections, each mustering three infantry tanks.

On 7 April 1941, the first change was made; the formations would drop infantry terminology and adopt cavalry terms. The brigade would now be able to muster 178 tanks, with each battalion made up of 58 tanks, 35 officers, and 547 other ranks. The brigade headquarters was issued four cruiser tanks and the battalion headquarters four infantry tanks. The battalion's three squadrons would comprise five troops, each of three infantry tanks, and a squadron headquarters of one infantry tank and two close support infantry tanks. The battalion remained the same through to August 1942, when each battalion headquarters was given an anti-aircraft troop of eight anti-aircraft tanks raising the battalion's strength to 66 tanks, 37 officers and 588 other ranks.

In November 1943, each brigade was allocated two anti-aircraft tanks and three bridge laying tanks, while each tank battalion headquarters had two of its anti-aircraft tanks replaced by observation tanks. The headquarters of each regiment was allocated 11 light tanks, while the squadrons remained unchanged. Each battalion could muster 52 infantry tanks, 11 light tanks, six close support tanks, six anti-aircraft tanks, two observation tanks, 38 officers and 670 other ranks, the brigade having 240 tanks. Later in the year, the observation tanks were removed from the battalion headquarters and eight were assigned to the brigade headquarters. In January 1945, the final change was made to the tank brigade; they were renamed armoured brigades and reorganised to the final armoured brigade structure as authorised on 18 January.

== Independent armoured and tank brigades ==
Independent brigades could operate independently without being permanently attached to any other units. The difference between an armoured and tank brigade were the tanks they were issued. Armoured brigades used Cruiser tanks, while the tank brigades used Infantry tanks.

The independent armoured brigades could in most cases trace their formation to an armoured division, 4th and 7th brigades to the 7th Armoured, 8th Brigade was part of 10th Armoured, before it was disbanded. 23rd Brigade part of 8th Armoured and 27th Brigade the 9th Armoured. Only 33rd Brigade was not originally part of an armoured division but was a tank brigade converted to an armoured brigade.

== See also ==
- Australian armoured units of World War II
- British Army during the Second World War
- Panzer division
- Italian armoured divisions during the Second World War

== Notes ==
Footnotes

Citations
