= Roger Evans (British Army officer) =

Major-General Roger Evans CB MC
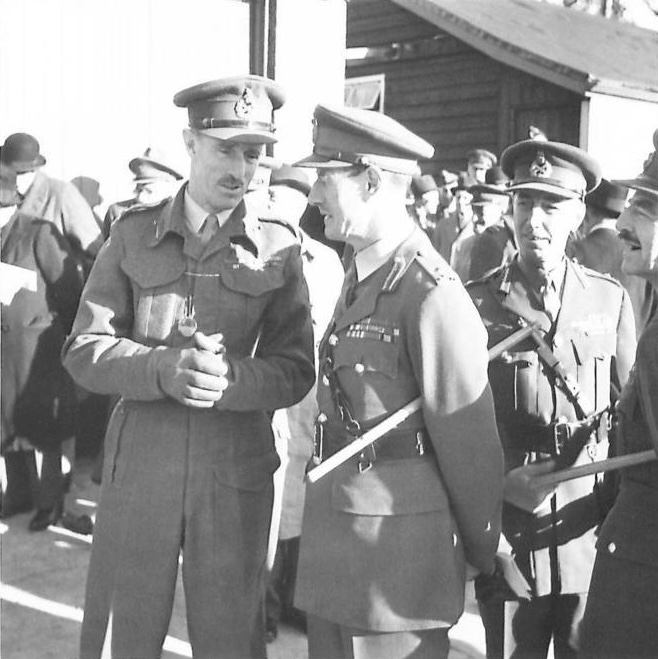
- Roger Evans (right) with John Crocker during the opening of the Army Cadet Force Center in 1945
- Born: 9 January 1886; Christchurch, Hampshire, England
- Died: 22 October 1968 (aged 82); Stocklinch, Ilminster, Somerset, England
- Military career
- Allegiance: United Kingdom
- Branch: British Army
- Service years: 1911–1944
- Rank: Major-General
- Service number: 23006
- Units: 7th Queen's Own Hussars; 5th Royal Inniskilling Dragoon Guards
- Commands: Aldershot Area (1941–1944); 1st Armoured Division (1938–1940); 5th Royal Inniskilling Dragoon Guards (1929–1933)
- Conflicts: First World War; Second World War
- Awards: Companion of the Order of the Bath; Military Cross; Mentioned in despatches

Major-General Roger Evans, CB, MC (9 January 1886 – 22 October 1968) was a British Army officer who commanded the 1st Armoured Division during the early stages of the Second World War.

== Military career ==
Evans was born in Christchurch, Hampshire, on 9 January 1886, the son of Roger Evans. After serving in the Territorial Force, he was commissioned into the 7th Hussars in December 1911. He saw service in the First World War, in the Mesopotamian campaign, from 1917 to 1918. Evans was awarded the Military Cross (MC) in 1918. His citation read:

For conspicuous gallantry and devotion to duty. This officer led the leading squadron with consummate skill and dash over unknown and difficult country. At dusk he took up a position astride the enemy's line of retreat and succeeded in cutting off and capturing the main portion of the enemy's force, which desperately attempted to break through during the night.

After attending the Staff College, Camberley, from 1920 to 1921, Evans then returned there, this time as a GSO2 instructor, from 1924 until 1927. He became commanding officer of the 5th Royal Inniskilling Dragoon Guards in 1929.

He was promoted to colonel on 2 November 1933, with seniority backdated to 1 July 1931, while serving on half-pay. This was followed by attendance at the Imperial Defence College in 1934, and a promotion to brigadier on the General Staff at Western Command in India in 1935. He was placed on half-pay in December 1937.

Evans was appointed General Officer Commanding (GOC) of the 1st Armoured Division in 1938, continuing in that role into the Second World War with the British Expeditionary Force in France, before relinquishing the appointment on 24 August 1940. He was made GOC Aldershot Area on 13 March 1941 and appointed a Companion of the Order of the Bath in the 1941 Birthday Honours, before being made supernumerary to the establishment on 9 January 1943.

Evans retired from the British Army on 13 October 1944. From 1937 to 1947 he held the colonelcy of the 5th Royal Inniskilling Dragoon Guards. He was appointed High Sheriff of Somersetshire in 1955.

== Bibliography ==
- Smart, Nick (2005). Biographical Dictionary of British Generals of the Second World War. Barnsley, South Yorkshire: Pen and Sword Books. ISBN 1844150496.

Military offices
Preceded by Alan Brooke	General Officer Commanding 1st Armoured Division; 1938–1940	Succeeded by Willoughby Norrie
Honorary titles
Preceded by Sir Tom Bridges	Colonel of the 5th Royal Inniskilling Dragoon Guards; 1937–1947	Succeeded by Sir Charles Keightley
