= 6th Support Group (United Kingdom) =

- 6th Support Group insignia
- Active: 1940 - 1942
- Country: United Kingdom
- Branch: British Army
- Type: Artillery and Infantry
- Role: Support Group
- Size: Brigade
- Part of: 6th Armoured Division

Insignia
- Insignia: Mailed Fist

== History ==
This was a brigade sized formation of the British Army attached to the 6th Armoured Division.

In the early days of the Second World War the support group (or Pivot Group as it was sometimes known) was what its name suggested. It provided whatever support the armoured brigades needed to the operation in hand, being able to provide motorised infantry, field artillery, anti-tank artillery or light anti-aircraft artillery as needed.

- 9th Battalion, The Queen's Own Royal West Kent Regiment (Motor infantry)
- 12th Regiment Royal Horse Artillery
- 72nd Anti-Tank Regiment, Royal Artillery
- 51st Light Anti-Aircraft Regiment, Royal Artillery

=== Commanders ===
- Brigadier T. Lyon-Smith

== See also ==
- List of British brigades of the Second World War
