= 61st Infantry Brigade (United Kingdom) =

61st Brigade 'M' Brigade 61st Infantry Brigade 61st (Lorried) Infantry Brigade
- Active: 14 September 1914 – 28 May 1919; 21 May 1944–1946
- Country: United Kingdom
- Branch: British Army
- Type: Infantry; Lorried infantry
- Size: Brigade
- Part of: 20th (Light) Division; 6th Armoured Division

Commanders
- Notable commanders: Sir Charles Richardson

61st Brigade (61st Bde) was an infantry formation of the British Army during the First World War. It was formed in September 1914 as part of the new army also known as Kitchener's Army and was assigned to the 20th (Light) Division, serving in the trenches of the Western Front. It was reformed as a motorised infantry brigade in Italy during the Second World War.

== World War I ==
On 6 August 1914, less than 48 hours after Britain's declaration of war, Parliament sanctioned an increase of 500,000 men for the Regular British Army. The new Secretary of State for War, Earl Kitchener of Khartoum, issued his famous call to arms: 'Your King and Country Need You', urging the first 100,000 volunteers to come forward. Men flooded into the recruiting offices and the 'first hundred thousand' were enlisted within days. This group of six infantry divisions with supporting arms became known as Kitchener's First New Army, or 'K1'. Recruits continued to arrive in large numbers, and Army Order No 382 of 11 September authorised a further six divisions (15th – 20th), which became the Second New Army (K2). 20th (Light) Division began forming at Aldershot with the 59th, 60th and 61st Brigades, initially composed entirely of service battalions from light infantry and rifle regiments.

=== Order of battle ===
61st Brigade was constituted as follows during the war:

- 7th (Service) Battalion, Somerset Light Infantry
- 7th (Service) Battalion, Duke of Cornwall's Light Infantry
- 7th (Service) Battalion, King's Own Yorkshire Light Infantry (disbanded 20 February 1918)
- 11th (Service) Battalion, Durham Light Infantry (left to become divisional pioneers 6 January 1915)
- 12th (Service) Battalion, King's Regiment (Liverpool) (joined from attached Army Troops 6 January 1915)
- 61st Company, Machine Gun Corps (joined 3 March 1916, moved to 20th Divisional Machine Gun Battalion 15 March 1918)
- 61st Trench Mortar Battery (formed as 61/1 and 61/2 by 4 May 1916, became single battery by 12 June 1916)

=== Service ===
The 20th (Light) Division crossed to France in July 1915 and completed its concentration in the area west of Saint-Omer by 26 July. Thereafter it served on the Western Front in the following operations:

1915

- Attack towards Fromelles 25 September

1916

- Battle of Mont Sorrel 2–13 June
- Battle of the Somme
  - Battle of Delville Wood 21 August – 3 September
  - Battle of Guillemont 3–5 September
  - Battle of Flers–Courcelette 16–20 September
  - Battle of Morval 27 September
  - Battle of the Transloy Ridges 1–8 October

1917

- German Retreat to the Hindenburg Line 14 March – 5 April
- Actions on the Hindenburg Line 26 May – 16 June
- Third Battle of Ypres
  - Battle of Langemarck 16–18 August
  - Battle of the Menin Road Ridge 20–25 September
  - Battle of Polygon Wood 26–28 September

Harry Patch, later to become the last surviving veteran of the trenches, served with 7th DCLI in 61st Brigade at Ypres in 1917 when he was 19 years old. He was wounded by shrapnel in September. He survived both world wars and lived until 2009 when he died, on 25 July, aged 111.

- Battle of Cambrai
  - The Tank Attack 20–21 November
  - Capture of Bourlon Wood 23–28 November
  - German Counter-Attacks 30 November – 2 December

1918

- German spring offensive
  - Battle of St Quentin 22–23 March
  - Actions at the Somme Crossings 24–25 March
  - Battle of Rosières 26–27 March
- Final Advance in Artois 2–6 October

Following the Armistice with Germany demobilisation of 20th (L) Division began in January 1919 and the division and its formations ceased to exist on 28 May 1919.

=== Insignia ===
Top row, left to right, top row: 6th 12th King's, 7th SLI, 7th DCLI, 7th KOYLI; bottom row: brigade HQ, 61st MG Co and 61st TM Bty.

The formation sign of 20th (L) Division was a white circle bearing a black cross with a red bull's-eye at the centre. In the summer of 1917 the division adopted a comprehensive scheme for battalion identification signs worn on both sleeves. These were black geometric shapes, with 61st Bde using squares. Underneath, one, two, three or four bars indicated the battalion's seniority. Before the adoption of the divisional scheme the 7th SLI wore a Rifle green horizontal rectangle on the right sleeve.

=== Commanders ===
The following officers commanded the brigade during the war:

- 18 September 1914: Brig.-Gen. O'Donnel Colley Grattan
- 6 July 1915: Brig.-Gen. Charles Ross
- 13 November 1915: Brig.-Gen. William Frederick Sweny (wounded, 2 June 1916)
- 3 June 1916: Lt.-Col. Clarence John Hobkirk (acting)
- 19 July 1916: Brig.-Gen. W. F. Sweny (sick, 24 July 1916)
- 27 July 1916: Brig.-Gen. Walter Edward Banbury
- 12 March 1918 – 27 March 1919: Brig.-Gen. James Kilvington Cochrane

=== Recipients of the Victoria Cross ===
- Private Wilfred Edwards, 7th KOYLI
- Serjeant David Jones, 12th King's Regiment

== Second World War ==
The brigade was reactivated in Italy during the Second World War, composed of three motor battalions of the Rifle Brigade, the 2nd, 7th and 10th, the former being of the Regular Army and the latter two of the Territorial Army (TA). Formed on 21 May 1944 as 'M' Brigade under Eighth Army, it was renamed the 61st Infantry Brigade on 29 May when it joined 6th Armoured Division. On 20 March 1945 it was renamed 61st (Lorried) Infantry Brigade and the motor battalions were reorganised as lorried infantry.

=== Order of battle ===
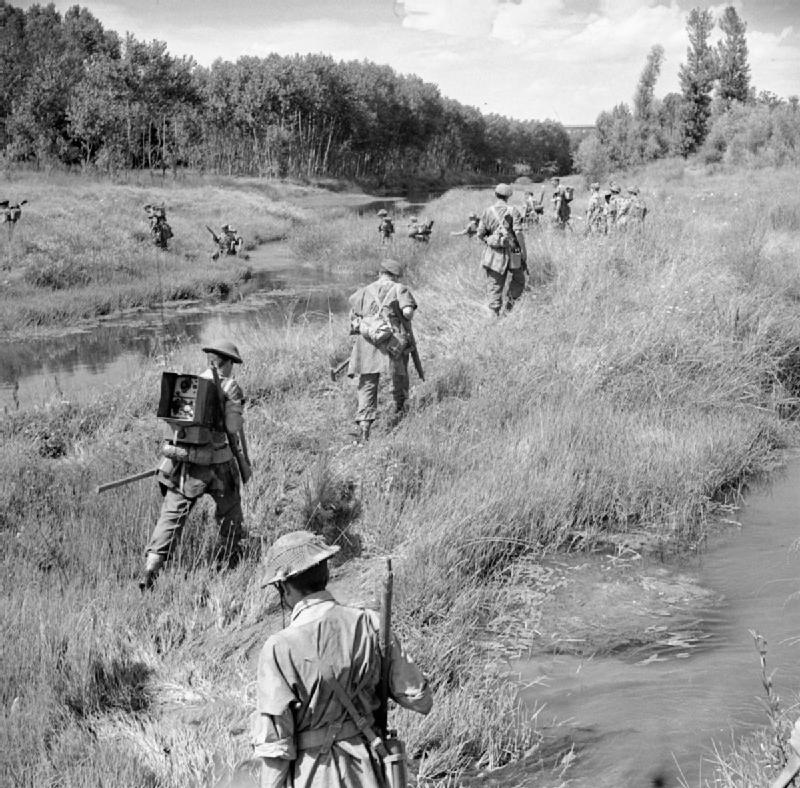
A patrol comprising 'C' Company of 10th Rifle Brigade sets off in the Arno valley, Italy, 17 July 1944.

The brigade was constituted as follows during the war:

- 2nd Battalion, Rifle Brigade (left 8 August 1945)
- 7th Battalion, Rifle Brigade (London Rifle Brigade) (left 22 July 1945)
- 10th Battalion, Rifle Brigade (Tower Hamlets Rifles) (disbanded 22 March 1945)
- 1st Battalion, King's Royal Rifle Corps (from 8 March to 22 July 1945)
- 1st Battalion, Welch Regiment (from 29 June 1945)
- 2nd Battalion, Queen's Own Cameron Highlanders (from 19 July 1945)
- 1st Battalion, Royal Sussex Regiment (from 19 July 1945)

=== Actions ===
The brigade participated in the following actions:

- Liri Valley 18–30 May 1944
- Arezzo 4–17 July 1944
- Advance to Florence 17 July – 10 August 1944
- Gothic Line 25 August – 22 September 1944
- Argenta Gap 13–21 April 1945

=== Commanders ===
The following officers commanded the brigade during the war:

- 21–25 May 1944: Lt. Col. D. Darling (acting)
- 25 May 1944 – 27 July 1945: Brig. Clements Gore
- 11 January – 5 February 1945: Lt. Col. Richard Fyffe (acting)
