= 26th Armoured Brigade =

The 26th Armoured Brigade was part of the British Army during the Second World War.

== History ==
This brigade was converted from the British 1st Motor Machine Gun Brigade on 12 October 1940. It served with British 6th Armoured Division during the North African Campaign and then through the Italian Campaign. During this time it was briefly attached to the British 4th Infantry Division and the British 78th Infantry Division.

=== Commanders ===
- Brigadier Charles Anderson Lane Dunphie 1942−1943
- Brigadier Philip George Bradley Roberts March−June 1943
- Brigadier Richard Amyatt Hull June−December 1943
- Brigadier Francis Mitchell January 1944−July 1945
- Brigadier David Dawnay August 1945−1946

== Units ==
- 16th/5th Lancers
- 17th/21st Lancers
- 2nd Lothians and Border Horse
- 4th Queen's Own Hussars
- 10th Battalion, Rifle Brigade (Tower Hamlets Rifles)
- 1st Battalion The King's Royal Rifle Corps
- 165th Light Field Ambulance
- B/72 Anti Tank Regiment
- 8 Field Squadron Royal Engineers
- C Squadron 1 Derby Yeomanry
- 1 Guards Brigade
- 153 Light Anti-Aircraft Battery

== See also ==
- British Armoured formations of World War II
- List of British brigades of the Second World War
