= Ralph Stewart-Wilson =

Colonel Ralph Stewart-Wilson (26 January 1923 – 2 February 2015) was a Scottish landowner and soldier of the 7th Battalion of the Rifle Brigade who won the Military Cross in Italy in 1944.

Born in Perthshire, he began life as Ralph Stewart Hood Wilson, the elder son of Aubyn Harold Raymond Wilson and his wife Muriel Athelstan Hood Stewart of Balnakeilly, of Moncreiffe House, Dunbarny, Perthshire. The young Stewart-Wilson was educated at Eton College.

His brother Blair Aubyn Wilson was born in 1929. In May 1934, their father died while living in Australia.

In 1941, he left Eton and was commissioned into the Rifle Brigade. On 5 December 1944, he was awarded the Military Cross for his reconnaissance work under heavy fire during the advance on Aquino.

Stewart-Wilson saw further active service in Kenya and Malaya in the 1950s. He retired from the Army in 1971, with the rank of Colonel.

Following the death of his mother in 1982, he was laird of Balnakeilly, near Pitlochry, in Perthshire, and died there on 2 February 2015.
