= Salerno mutiny =

1943 British soldiers' rebellion

Coordinates: 40°40′N 14°46′E

The Salerno mutiny occurred during the Second World War and involved about 200 British soldiers who, on 16 September 1943, refused assignment to new units as replacements during the initial stages of the Allied invasion of Italy.

About 1,500 men from the 50th (Northumbrian) and 51st (Highland) Infantry Divisions sailed from Tripoli, on the understanding that they were to join the rest of their units, at the time based in Sicily and soon to return to the United Kingdom in preparation for Operation Overlord, the Allied invasion of Normandy. Both of these divisions had served as part of General Sir Bernard Montgomery's British Eighth Army, and were veterans of the North African campaign.

Once aboard ship, the men were told that they were being taken to Salerno, Italy, to join the British 46th Infantry Division (Major-General John Hawkesworth) and 56th (London) Infantry Division (Major-General Douglas Graham), which had both suffered heavy losses. Both divisions were serving as part of Lieutenant-General Richard McCreery's British X Corps, which itself was fighting as part of Lieutenant General Mark Clark's U.S. Fifth Army. Many of the soldiers felt they had been deliberately misled.

Matters were made worse by the complete lack of organisation when they reached Salerno, leaving them angry and frustrated. About one thousand of the men, who were fresh recruits, were taken off to join new units, leaving 500 veterans, 300 of whom were billeted in a nearby field. They were still there by 20 September, refusing postings to unfamiliar units. They were addressed by Lieutenant-General McCreery, the General Officer Commanding (GOC) of the British X Corps, who admitted that a mistake had been made, and promised that they would rejoin their old units once Salerno was secure. The men were also warned of the consequences of mutiny in wartime.

Of the three hundred men in the field, 108 decided to follow orders, leaving a hard core of 192. They were all charged with mutiny under the Army Act. This was the largest number of men accused of mutiny at any one time in all of British military history. The accused were shipped to French Algeria, where the courts-martial opened towards the end of October. All were found guilty, and three sergeants were sentenced to death. The sentences were subsequently commuted to 12 years of forced labour and eventually suspended. In the House of Commons debate held in March 2000 an official pardon was requested by Aberdeen South MP Anne Begg claiming that those indicted were not refusing to fight but merely requesting the fulfilment of a promise by higher command. However John Spellar, the Minister for the Armed Forces, denied this request by indicating that however unfair the order to proceed to combat in other units seemed, the refusal to do so in wartime constituted a grave crime, not to be pardoned.

== Bibliography ==
- David, Saul (2005). Mutiny at Salerno: An Injustice Exposed. London: Conway Maritime Press. pp. 240 pages. ISBN 978-1-84486-019-7.
