= Manley James =

British Army officer & recipient of the Victoria Cross

Brigadier Manley James VC DSO MBE MC DL
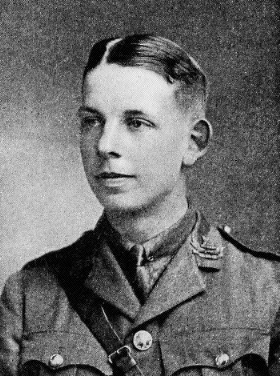
- Born: 12 July 1896; Odiham, Hampshire, England
- Died: 23 September 1975 (aged 79); Westbury-on-Trym, Bristol, England
- Burial place: Canford Cemetery and Crematorium, Westbury-on-Trym, Bristol, England
- Military career
- Allegiance: United Kingdom
- Branch: British Army
- Service years: 1914–1951
- Rank: Brigadier
- Service number: 9531
- Units: Gloucestershire Regiment; Royal Sussex Regiment
- Commands: Director of Ground Defence, Air Ministry (1948–1950); 140th Infantry Brigade (1945); 128th Infantry Brigade (1941–1943); 2nd Battalion, Royal Sussex Regiment (1939–1940)
- Conflicts: First World War; Arab revolt in Palestine; Second World War
- Awards: Victoria Cross; Distinguished Service Order; Member of the Order of the British Empire; Military Cross; Mentioned in Despatches (3)

Brigadier Manley Angell James, VC, DSO, MBE, MC, DL (12 July 1896 – 23 September 1975) was a British Army officer and an English recipient of the Victoria Cross, the highest award for gallantry in the face of the enemy that can be awarded to British and Commonwealth forces.

== Early years ==
Manley Angell James was born in Odiham, Hampshire, on 12 July 1896, the son of Dr. John Angell James and Emily Cormel James, and the second of four children. The family later moved to Bristol, where Manley was educated at Bristol Grammar School in 1906 and joined the Officers' Training Corps (OTC), where he rose to the rank of sergeant.

== First World War ==
Although intending to follow his father into the medical profession, having already entered a medical course at Bristol University in the autumn, the outbreak of the First World War in August 1914, shortly after his eighteenth birthday, saw James, along with many others of his generation, volunteer for service with the British Army instead. As a result, on 1 December 1914, James was gazetted as an officer, with the rank of temporary second lieutenant (see temporary gentlemen), into the 8th (Service) Battalion of the Gloucestershire Regiment, a line infantry regiment of the British Army with a distinguished history.

The battalion, a Kitchener's Army unit raised from civilian volunteers in September, formed part of the 57th Brigade of the 19th (Western) Division (nicknamed "The Butterfly Division" due to its divisional insignia) and, after many months of training, departed for service on the Western Front in July 1915, arriving in France on 18 July as part of the British Expeditionary Force (BEF). The battalion was to remain on the Western Front for the rest of the war. By this time James, promoted to temporary lieutenant on 28 June 1915, was in command of the battalion's lewis gun detachment.

With most of the rest of 1915 spent learning about the basics of trench warfare, July 1916 saw the battalion – then commanded by Lieutenant Colonel Adrian Carton de Wiart – engaged in the Battle of the Somme, specifically in the capture of La Boisselle. James was "severely injured in the thigh" in this action and evacuated to England for treatment. He was mentioned in despatches for his handling of the battalion's Lewis guns, and returned to France in December as a member of the 57th Brigade HQ staff, which was not to his liking. He rejoined his battalion soon afterwards and was promoted to the temporary rank of captain on 22 February 1917, he was given command of 'A' Company and was again wounded, this time by shrapnel, and in April he was again mentioned in despatches. Returning again to the front, he fought in the Battle of Messines in June 1917, where he was slightly wounded and awarded the Military Cross (MC) for his part in capturing a position called Druid's Farm. James's company was singled out for praise by the 19th Division's general officer commanding (GOC), Major General Tom Bridges, who issued a special order, awarding a badge of Honour to 'A' Company, enabling the badge to be worn on the right sleeve of every member of James's company. The citation for his MC reads:

For conspicuous gallantry and devotion to duty. Previous to our attack, he took up a forward position under heavy hostile barrage in order to obtain accurate information as to the progress of our advance. He afterwards went forward and assisted to consolidate, as well as in the capture of a strong point, and having rallied the supports when they were disorganised by hostile fire he led them to their position. He then made a very daring personal reconnaissance of the whole line under heavy shelling and rifle fire that he might send back a report to his battalion commander, and his total disregard of danger and brilliant initiative throughout the action were largely responsible for its success.

The German Army launched its Spring Offensive in March 1918 with the aim of cutting off the BEF, deployed mainly in northern Belgium, from the French Army in the south. The German intention was to force a victory on the Western Front before the United States (which had entered the war in April 1917) were able to deploy significant numbers of troops on the Western Front, thereby making victory for Germany all but impossible against the overwhelming resources of the United States.

=== Victoria Cross action ===
On 21 March 1918, near Velu Wood, France, James led his company forward, capturing 27 prisoners and two machine-guns. Although wounded, he refused to leave his company and repulsed three enemy assaults over the next day. Two days later, the enemy having broken through, he made a determined stand. His company inflicted heavy losses and gained valuable time for the withdrawal of the guns. After holding out to the last to enable the brigade to be extricated, he led his company forward in a local counter-attack, being again wounded in the process. He was last seen working a machine-gun single-handed, was wounded a third time and eventually taken prisoner.

James's company sustained seventy-five percent casualties in the offensive and many believed James himself to have been killed in action. In May, from a prisoner of war camp, he managed to send a postcard to his father, "informing him that he had been wounded in the neck, shoulder, jaw and stomach". He was released soon after the Armistice with Germany in November and arrived in England on 25 December 1918.

== Between the wars ==
James was invested with his VC by King George V at Buckingham Palace on 22 February 1919. He was later discharged from the army, and played for Clifton Rugby Football Club for a few years before receiving a permanent Regular Army commission as a lieutenant in the Gloucestershire Regiment on 10 December 1920 (with seniority backdated to 1 July 1917). James was one of only two Glosters' officers who had received a wartime commission to be granted a commission in the Regular Army.

On 27 May 1925 James was promoted to captain and later served as adjutant of the 1st Battalion, Glosters from 12 December 1925 until 14 December 1928. In 1926 he became engaged to Miss Noreen Cooper, marrying her two years later, and had their only child, a son, Peter, born in December 1930. James served with the battalion in Egypt between 1928 and 1930 before returning to the regimental depot in Bristol and, from 1930 to 1931, he attended the Staff College, Camberley, where his many fellow students included Miles Dempsey, James Steele, George Symes, George Hopkinson, William Gott, John Nichols and Maurice Chilton, all of whom were to achieve general officer rank in the next war.

James returned to the 1st Battalion, Glosters as a company commander in 1933 and from November 1934 to December 1936 he was a General Staff Officer (GSO) with Western Command. Promoted to major on 25 December 1936, he succeeded John Nichols, his fellow student at Camberley, as a brigade major with the 13th Infantry Brigade, The brigade was then commanded by Brigadier John Priestman until succeeded in September 1938 by Brigadier Reade Godwin-Austen. The brigade was serving in Palestine during the Arab revolt, before returning to England where it became part of the 5th Infantry Division, then serving under Northern Command. James held this post until January 1939. Promoted to brevet lieutenant colonel on 1 July 1938, on 10 January 1939 he transferred from the Gloucestershire Regiment to the Royal Sussex Regiment and receiving promotion in that regiment to lieutenant colonel, and, on the same date, became commanding officer (CO) of the 2nd Battalion, Royal Sussex. The battalion was then serving in Belfast, Northern Ireland, on internal security duties.

== Second World War ==
At the start of the Second World War in September 1939 his battalion was sent to England where it became part of the 133rd Infantry Brigade of the 44th (Home Counties) Infantry Division, a Territorial Army (TA) formation, then preparing for overseas service in France.

On 21 March 1940 he relinquished command of the battalion and, promoted to acting colonel the following day, became a GSO1 of the 54th (East Anglian) Infantry Division, another TA formation, then commanded by Major General John Priestman, who had commanded the 13th Brigade years before when James had been brigade major. On 19 July 1940, shortly after the Dunkirk evacuation, James was promoted to the acting rank of brigadier, and served on the staff of the newly created VIII Corps. The corps was commanded by Lieutenant General Harold Franklyn, who James knew as the commander of the 5th Division in the late 1930s. He was not there long, however, as in February 1941 he succeeded Brigadier Frederick Browning as CO of the 128th Infantry Brigade, then serving in Kent as part of the 43rd (Wessex) Infantry Division, then commanded by Major General Charles Allfrey, and comprising three TA battalions of the Hampshire Regiment (later the Royal Hampshire Regiment). On 12 December 1941 James's rank of colonel was made permanent (with seniority backdated to 1 July 1941). In August 1942 the 43rd Division, now commanded by Major General Ivor Thomas, was reorganised as a 'mixed' division and the 128th Brigade transferred to Major General Harold Freeman-Attwood's 46th Infantry Division.

After months spent training in desert warfare, James led the brigade overseas to North Africa in mid-January 1943, where it fought throughout the Tunisian campaign until its end in mid-May with distinction, earning James a Distinguished Service Order (DSO). The campaign came to an end in mid-May 1943, with the surrender of thousands of Axis soldiers. James was described as, "Personally as brave as a lion, he was at the same time careful and solicitous about how he committed his troops." After initially being held in reserve for the Allied invasion of Sicily, the brigade then settled down for training before taking part in the Allied invasion of Italy in September where his brigade, along with the rest of the division, now commanded by Major-General John Hawkesworth, sustained very heavy casualties, including James himself, being badly wounded in the leg on 20 September and reluctantly allowed himself to be evacuated via hospital ship to Egypt.

In 1944, after recovering from his injuries, he was assigned to the General Staff of Middle East Command, and was transferred to the General Staff for Training Home Forces. Finally, in 1945, he became the CO for the 140th Infantry Brigade, a training formation.

== Post-war ==
Between 1948 and 1951 he was the Director of Ground Defence for the Air Ministry. He was promoted to the permanent rank of brigadier on 1 July 1948 and on 1 March 1951 he retired from the military. He died in Westbury-on-Trym at the age of 79 on 23 September 1975, and was cremated at Canford Cemetery.

His VC is on display in the Lord Ashcroft Gallery at the Imperial War Museum, London.

== Bibliography ==
- Ashcroft, Michael (2007) [2006]. Victoria Cross Heroes. London: Headline Review. ISBN 978-0-7553-1633-5.
- Buzzell, Nora, ed. (1997). The Register of the Victoria Cross. Cheltenham, Gloucestershire: This England Alma House. ISBN 0-906324-27-0.
- Gliddon, Gerald (2013) [2004]. Spring Offensive 1918. VCs of the First World War. Stroud, Gloucestershire: The History Press. ISBN 978-0-7524-8730-4.
