= General Ransom =

General Ransom may refer to:

- Matt Whitaker Ransom (1826–1904), Confederate States Army brigadier general
- Robert Ransom Jr. (1828–1892), Confederate States Army major general
- Thomas E. G. Ransom (1834–1864), Union Army brigadier general
- Truman B. Ransom (1802–1847), Vermont Militia major general

== See also ==
- Algernon Ransome (1883–1969), British Army major general
- Enitan Ransome-Kuti (born 1964), Nigerian Army brigadier general
