= Stephen Weir =

New Zealand diplomat

Major-General Sir Stephen Weir KBE CB DSO & Bar
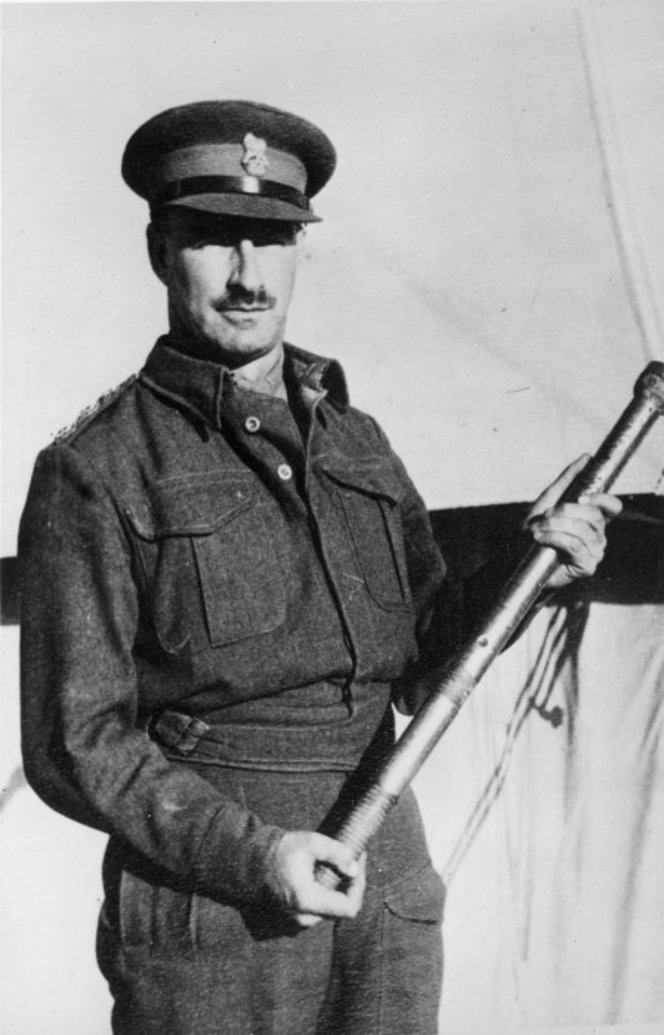
- Weir holding an artillery rammer, late 1941/early 1942
- Born: 5 October 1904; Dunedin, New Zealand
- Died: 24 September 1969 (aged 64); Tauranga, New Zealand
- Military career
- Allegiance: New Zealand
- Branch: New Zealand Military Forces
- Service years: 1923–61
- Rank: Major-General
- Service number: 1523
- Commands: Chief of the General Staff (1955–60); Southern Military District (1948–50); British 46th Infantry Division (1944–46); 2nd New Zealand Division (1944); 6th Field Regiment (1940–41)
- Conflicts: Second World War; Battle of Greece; Battle of Crete; Operation Crusader; Italian campaign
- Awards: Knight Commander of the Order of the British Empire; Companion of the Order of the Bath; Distinguished Service Order & Bar; Mentioned in Despatches (4); Commander of the Legion of Merit (United States); Cross of Valour (Greece)

Major-General Sir Stephen Cyril Ettrick Weir, KBE, CB, DSO & Bar (5 October 1904 – 24 September 1969) was a New Zealand military leader and diplomat.

Born in Otago, Weir became a professional soldier in 1927. He served in a number of postings around the country until the outbreak of the Second World War. Seconded to the Second New Zealand Expeditionary Force, he commanded a field regiment during the campaign in Greece and Operation Crusader. He was Commander, Royal Artillery of the 2nd New Zealand Division for two years, and in the absence of its nominal commanding officer, Major-General Bernard Freyberg, led the division for a period in 1944. Late that year, he was appointed commander of the British 46th Infantry Division. After the war he was Quartermaster General of the New Zealand Military Forces before starting a five-yeam term as Chief of the General Staff. He retired from the military to become ambassador to Thailand in 1961. He ceased his diplomatic career in 1967 and died in Tauranga two years later.

== Early life ==
Cyril Ettrick Weir, born in Otago, New Zealand on 5 October 1904, was the son of a farmer and his wife. Although his given name was Cyril, he was known from his early childhood as Steve. He was educated at Otago Boys' High School, where he was part of the school's cadet group. He graduated in 1921 and the following year moved to Wellington where he was employed at the Stamp Duties Department. He was interested in a career in the military but no opportunities were available for officer cadets in the New Zealand Military Forces at the time. Instead, soon after his move to Wellington, he joined the Territorial Force and served with the 6th Mounted Rifles.

== Military career ==
In 1925, the New Zealand government arranged for a cadetship for a New Zealand student at the Royal Military Academy in England. Weir was the successful applicant, with his experience as a school cadet and as a territorial a factor in the decision by the military authorities to award him the cadetship. He completed his studies and was commissioned as a second lieutenant in the New Zealand Artillery in 1927. He was seconded to Royal Artillery units while in England and returned to New Zealand the following year. For the next few years he served in a number of posts around the country working with Territorial units. In 1931, now a lieutenant, he was among the military personnel dispatched to Napier to assist the local populace after the earthquake there. Two years later he was posted to Auckland where he became adjutant of the 1st Field Artillery Brigade. He received a promotion to captain in 1935 and married the next year.

=== Second World War ===
Following the outbreak of the Second World War in September 1939, Weir was seconded to the Second New Zealand Expeditionary Force (2NZEF) which was formed for service overseas. He helped with the formation of various artillery units before being promoted to major and appointed commander, with the rank of acting lieutenant-colonel of the 6th Field Regiment of the New Zealand Artillery. He departed New Zealand with his command and a large contingent of the 2NZEF in early 1940. During the transit to North Africa, Weir was commander of troops aboard the transport ship HMT Ormonde. He had to deal with a near mutiny by some of the soldiers aboard when the ship stopped at Bombay, due to the poor quality food being loaded there. He took the men's concerns seriously and did his best to resolve them, antagonising port officials. The manner in which he dealt with the situation was appreciated by the men under his command.

Once in North Africa, the bulk of the 2NZEF formed the 2nd New Zealand Division, under the command of Major-General Bernard Freyberg. It was soon sent to Greece to counter the expected German invasion there. He performed well during the Battle of Greece in April 1941 and was recognised with the Distinguished Service Order (DSO).

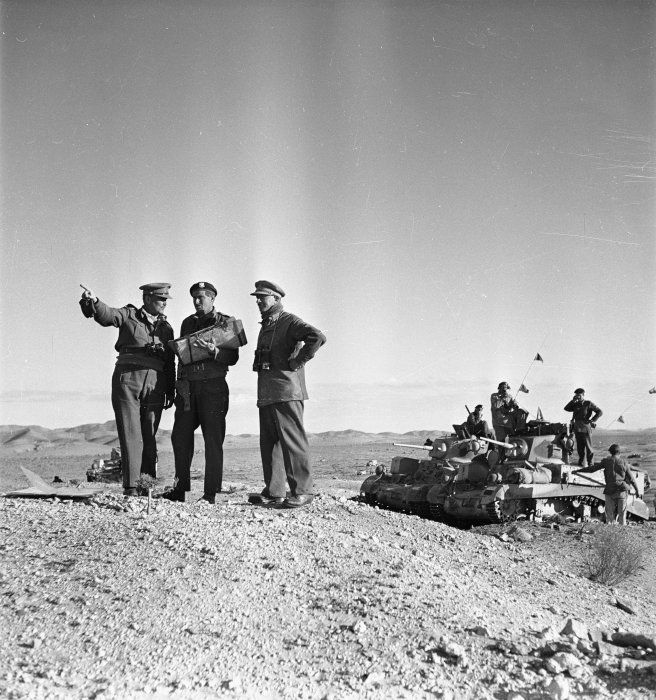
Major-General Freyberg, commander of the 2nd New Zealand Division, confers with Weir (on right) during the advance on Tripoli, January 1943.

Weir became commander of the divisional artillery (CRA) in November 1941, after the previous CRA, Brigadier Reginald Miles, was captured. He had himself narrowly avoided being captured while supervising the retreat of the 6th Field Regiment during the Battle of Sidi Rezegh, the same action that saw Miles made a prisoner of war. Promoted to brigadier shortly after assuming command, he built on the work of Miles and implemented measures to concentrate fire of the divisional artillery. This was used to good effect at Minqar Quaim, during the Battle of Mersa Matruh in June 1942. Later that year, his work in co-ordinating the artillery efforts during the Second Battle of El Alamein earned him a Bar to his DSO. The division was soon transferred to the Italian Front as part of the British Eighth Army, with Weir continuing as CRA. In June 1944, he commanded the artillery of X Corps during the later stages of the Battle of Monte Cassino. In September, he was acting commander of the 2nd New Zealand Division while Freyberg recovered from injuries sustained in an aircraft crash. Weir ably led the division during the battles of Rimini, Bellaria and Rubicone. He relinquished command on Freyberg's return to the division in October 1944.

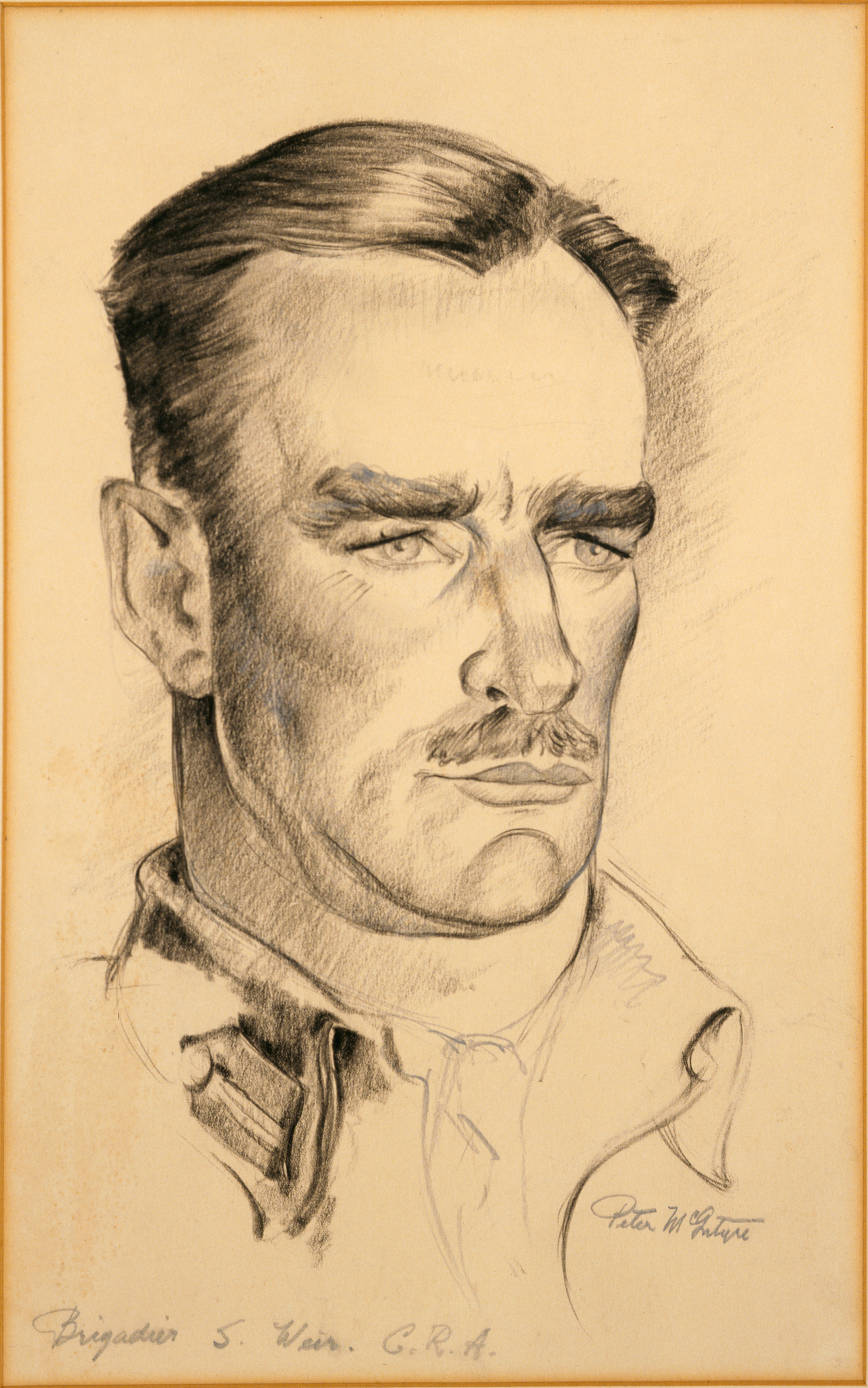
A sketch of Weir by the official war artist for the 2NZEF, Peter McIntyre

In November 1944 Weir was promoted to temporary major-general and given command of the British 46th Infantry Division, the only officer of a Dominion army to lead a British division during the Second World War. He led his new command during its crossing of the Lamone River and at the end of the year was made a Commander of the Order of the British Empire for his work in Italy. In early 1945, his division was transferred to Greece, which was being contested by left- and right-wing Greek guerrillas after its abandonment by the Germans. The 46th Division supervised the disarmament of guerrilla forces in Greece, work which was personally recognised with Weir receiving the Greek Cross of Valour. The division returned to the Italian front in April 1945 and then, on the cessation of hostilities, moved into Austria on occupation duties. During the war he had been mentioned in despatches on four occasions and before the year was out he was appointed a Companion of the Order of the Bath. He also received the United States Legion of Merit.

=== Postwar ===
Weir relinquished command of 46th Division in September 1946, and returned to his nominal rank of brigadier. He sought a transfer to the British Army but was thwarted by logistic constraints. His return to New Zealand was delayed due to serious health issues but he eventually took up command of the Southern Military District in 1948. Two years later he attended the Imperial Defence College after which he served in the War Office in London.

In 1952, Weir was appointed quartermaster general of the New Zealand Army (newly formed from the New Zealand Military Forces as a result of the New Zealand Army Act 1950). The following year he was awarded the Queen Elizabeth II Coronation Medal. His appointment as quartermaster general was followed by a term as chief of the General Staff (CGS), from 1955 to 1960. During this time he oversaw the abolition of compulsory military training, a government policy which he personally disagreed with but carried out to the best of his ability. He also worked to improve relations with the military of the United States. Formally adding Stephen as a forename by deed poll in 1960, he was knighted following the completion of his CGS term. He became a military consultant to the New Zealand Government, working in the Prime Minister's Department and advising the Prime Minister, Walter Nash, on military matters affecting foreign affairs.

== Later life ==
Weir retired from the military after his appointment as ambassador to Thailand in 1961. His remit also included representation in Laos and the Republic of Vietnam (South Vietnam) and he was influential in New Zealand governmental policy towards the developing Vietnam War. While in Thailand, he represented New Zealand on the Council of the South East Asian Treaty Organisation (SEATO). He retired in 1967 and returned to New Zealand to settle in Tauranga.

He died on 24 September 1969 and was survived by his wife of 33 years, Betty née Winthrop, and three sons. He is buried at Purewa Cemetery in Auckland, New Zealand.

== Notes ==
Military offices
| Preceded by John Hawkesworth | GOC 46th Infantry Division; 1944–1946 | Succeeded by John Combe |
| Preceded by William Gentry | Chief of the General Staff; 1955–1960 | Succeeded by Leonard Thornton |
