= 46th Infantry Division (United Kingdom) =

British 2nd Line Territorial Army formation

- Formation sign of the 46th Infantry Division
- Active: 1939–1947
- Branch: Territorial Army
- Type: Infantry
- Role: Infantry
- Size: War establishment strength: 13,863–18,347 men (Note: This is the war establishment, the on-paper strength. The war establishment of an infantry division during 1939–1941 was 13,863 men; following 1941, it increased to 17,298 men; for the final two years of the war, it was 18,347 men.)
- Nickname: Oak Tree Division
- Engagements: St Omer-La Bassée; El Kouriza; Tunis; Italian Campaign: *Salerno landings *Naples; *Volturno Line; *Monte Camino; *Gothic Line; **Coriano; **Rimini Line; **Lamone Crossing

Commanders
- Notable commanders: Henry Curtis; Harold Freeman-Attwood; John Hawkesworth; Stephen Weir

The 46th Infantry Division was a British Army infantry division formed during the Second World War that fought during the Battle of France, the Tunisian Campaign, and the Italian Campaign. In March 1939, after Germany re-emerged as a significant military power and occupied Czechoslovakia, the British Army increased the number of divisions in the Territorial Army (TA) by duplicating existing units. The 46th Infantry Division was formed in October 1939, as a second-line duplicate of the 49th (West Riding) Infantry Division. The division's battalions were drawn largely from men living in the English North Midlands.

It was intended that the division would remain in the United Kingdom to complete training and preparation, before being deployed to France within twelve months of war breaking out. However, in April 1940, the division was sent to join the British Expeditionary Force (BEF) in France, leaving behind most of its administration, logistical units, heavy weapons, and artillery. The men were assigned to labouring duties. Following the German invasion of France, the division, only partly trained and ill-equipped, was ordered to the frontline. It was mauled in a series of engagements, before it was evacuated from France during the Dunkirk evacuation and in the subsequent evacuation codenamed Operation Aerial. Back in the United Kingdom, the division was rebuilt and trained extensively.

In December 1942, it departed for North Africa and fought in the campaign in Tunisia. In 1943, it landed at Salerno and fought in Italy through 1943 and into 1944. The division was then given a three-month respite in Africa and the Middle East before it returned to fight in Italy during the campaign to break through the Gothic Line. At the end of 1944, the division was dispatched to Greece after the second stage of the country's civil war broke out. It fought several skirmishes with communist partisans and assisted the Greek Government in restoring order. In 1945, the division returned to Italy just after the Spring 1945 offensive in Italy began. The division did not arrive at the forward area until after the campaign, and the war in Europe had ended. It then marched into Austria to form part of the occupation force. There, the division took part in Operation Keelhaul, which included the forced repatriation of Cossacks to the Soviet Union, some of whom were later executed. The division was disbanded in Austria in 1947 as part of Britain's post-war demobilisation.

== Background ==
During the 1930s, tensions increased between Germany and the United Kingdom and its allies. In late 1937 and throughout 1938, German demands for the annexation of the Sudetenland in Czechoslovakia led to an international crisis. To avoid war, the British prime minister Neville Chamberlain met with German chancellor Adolf Hitler in September and brokered the Munich Agreement. It averted a war and allowed Germany to annex the Sudetenland. Although Chamberlain had intended the agreement to lead to further peaceful resolution of issues, relations between the two countries soon deteriorated. On 15 March 1939, Germany breached the terms of the agreement by invading and occupying the remnants of the Czech state.

On 29 March, Leslie Hore-Belisha, the secretary of state for war, announced Britain's plans to increase the Territorial Army (TA) from 130,000 to 340,000 men and double the number of TA divisions. (Note: The TA was a reserve of the British regular army made up of part-time volunteers. By 1939, its intended role was to be the sole method of expanding the size of the British armed forces (comparable to the creation of Kitchener's Army during the First World War). First-line territorial formations would create a second-line division using a cadre of trained personnel, and a third division would also be created if needed. All TA recruits were required to take the general service obligation, meaning that territorial soldiers could be sent overseas. (This avoided the complications experienced with the First World War Territorial Force, whose members had to volunteer for overseas service.)) The plan was for existing TA divisions, referred to as the first-line, to recruit over their establishments (aided by an increase in pay for Territorials, the removal of restrictions on promotion which had hindered recruiting, construction of better-quality barracks, and an increase in supper rations) and then form a new division, known as the second-line, from cadres around which the new divisions could be expanded. This process was dubbed "duplicating". The 49th (West Riding) Infantry Division provided cadres to create a second-line "duplicate" formation, which became the 46th Infantry Division. Despite the intention for the army to grow, a lack of central guidance on the expansion and duplication process, and a lack of facilities, equipment, and instructors complicated the programme. In April 1939, 34,500 men, all aged 20, were conscripted into the regular army, initially to be trained for six months before being deployed to the forming second-line units. The War Office had envisioned that the duplication process, and recruiting the required numbers of men, would take no more than six months. The process varied widely between the TA divisions. Some were ready in weeks while others had made little progress by the time the Second World War began on 1 September.

== History ==
=== Formation ===
On 2 October 1939, the 46th Infantry Division became active. The division took control of the 137th, the 138th, and the 139th Infantry Brigades, in addition to supporting divisional units, which had been administered by the 49th (West Riding) Infantry Division. Major-General Algernon Ransome, who was called out of retirement and had previously commanded a brigade in the British Indian Army during the mid-1930s, was made the general officer commanding (GOC). The 137th Brigade had been created as the second-line duplicate of the 147th Infantry Brigade, and comprised the 2/5th Battalion, West Yorkshire Regiment; the 2/6th Battalion, Duke of Wellington's Regiment (2/6DWR); and the 2/7DWR. The 138th Brigade was raised as the duplicate of the 146th Infantry Brigade and consisted of the 6th Battalion, Lincolnshire Regiment; the 2/4th Battalion, King's Own Yorkshire Light Infantry (2/4KOYLI); and the 6th Battalion, York and Lancaster Regiment. The 139th Infantry Brigade was the second-line duplicate of the 148th Infantry Brigade, and on formation comprised the 2/5th Battalion, Leicestershire Regiment (2/5LR); the 2/5th Battalion, Sherwood Foresters; and the 9th Battalion, Sherwood Foresters.

Because of the lack of official guidance, the newly formed units were at liberty to choose numbers, styles, and titles. The division adopted the number of their First World War counterpart, the 46th (North Midland) Division, but did not include a county within the name of the division. (Note: The Imperial War Museum refers to the division as the 46th (North Midland and West Riding) Division. However, H. F. Joslen's official history is compiled from official records, and does not include any county title for the division.) The division's battalions were drawn largely from the English North Midlands. To denote the association of the division with this area, a Sherwood Forest oak tree was chosen as the divisional insignia. The Imperial War Museum wrote that, "in addition, the oak was seen as an emblem of strength and reliability".

=== Initial service and transfer to France ===
The war deployment plan for the TA envisioned its divisions being sent overseas, as equipment became available, to reinforce the British Expeditionary Force (BEF) that had been already dispatched to Europe. The TA would join regular army divisions in waves as its divisions completed their training, the final divisions deploying a year after the war began. However, there was a need for men to guard strategically important locations, known as vulnerable points, and the division was primarily assigned to this duty until December 1939. This impacted training and spread the division out over a wide geographical area. While the division was ill-equipped and lacked transportation, it was assigned to anti-invasion duties in Yorkshire after the end of its guard-duty detail. On 5 December 1939, Major-General Henry Curtis took over command of the division; Curtis had previously commanded an infantry brigade within the BEF. At this point, the division was allocated a role within the defensive anti-invasion plan, codenamed Julius Caesar. (Note: Julius was the codeword to bring troops to a state of readiness within eight hours. The codeword Caesar meant an invasion was imminent, and units were to be readied for immediate action. The plan assumed that the Germans would use 4,000 paratroopers, followed by 15,000 troops landed via civilian aircraft once airfields had been secured (Germany only actually had 6,000 such troops), and at least one division of 15,000 troops to be used in an amphibious assault.) Divisions assigned to this role, were tasked with launching an immediate attack on German parachutists. If that was not possible, the division was to cordon off and immobilise any German invasion effort until relieved by forces capable of launching a major counter-attack to defeat the Germans.

As 1939 turned into 1940, the division became caught up in an effort to address manpower shortages among the BEF's rear-echelon units. (Note: By the end of April, 78,864 men were employed on lines-of-communication duties; 23,545 were allocated to headquarters, hospitals, and other rear-echelon duties; 9,051 were allocated as drafts; 2,515 had not been assigned a role; and 6,859 were supporting the Advanced Air Striking Force. Included in these figures was around 10,000 men who were assigned to railway and other construction tasks in support of the lines of communication.) More men were needed to work along the line of communication, and the army had estimated that by mid-1940 it would need at least 60,000 pioneers. The lack of such men had taxed the Royal Engineers and Auxiliary Military Pioneer Corps, and had also impacted frontline units that had to divert men from training to help construct defensive positions along the Franco-Belgian border. To address this issue, it was decided to deploy untrained territorial units as an unskilled workforce, thereby alleviating the strain on the existing pioneer units and freeing up regular units to complete their training. As a result, the decision was made to deploy the 12th (Eastern), 23rd (Northumbrian), and the 46th Infantry Divisions to France. Each division would leave their heavy equipment and most of their logistical, administrative, and support units behind. In total, the elements of the three divisions transported to France amounted to 18,347 men. The 46th Division was deployed to Brittany. The 137th Brigade was sent to aid in the unloading of supplies at Saint-Nazaire and Nantes, as well as helping construct railway sidings in that area. The other two brigades were deployed to Rennes to assist in railway construction and aid the transportation of ammunition supplies. The intent was that by August their job would be completed and they could return to the United Kingdom to resume training before being redeployed to France as front-line soldiers. The Army believed that this diversion from guard duty would also raise morale. Lionel Ellis, the author of the British official history of the BEF in France, wrote that while the divisions "were neither fully trained nor equipped for fighting ... a balanced programme of training was carried out so far as time permitted". Historian Tim Lynch commented the deployment also had a political dimension, allowing "British politicians to tell their French counterparts that Britain had supplied three more infantry divisions towards the promised nineteen by the end of the year."

General Edmund Ironside, chief of the imperial general staff, was opposed to such a use of these divisions. He reluctantly caved to the political pressure to release the divisions, having been assured by General Lord Gort (commander of the BEF) that the troops would not be used as frontline combat formations. The 46th Division departed Southampton on 28 April and arrived at Cherbourg the following day. Each of the division's nine battalions were equipped with four 2 inches (51 millimetres) mortars, 18 Bren light machine guns, 10 Boys anti-tank rifles and 12 trucks. This placed the division below its establishment of 108 two-inch mortars, 361 anti-tank rifles, and 810 trucks for transporting troops; but over the required establishment of 28 Bren guns.

=== Battle of France ===
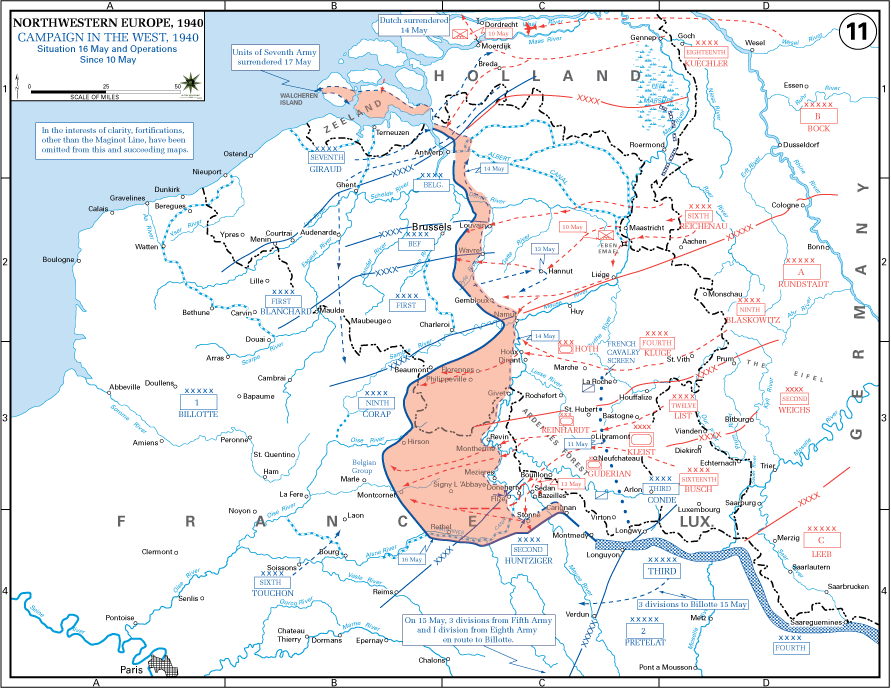
The operating area of the various Belgian, British, and French field armies and army groups are shown in blue. The German field armies and corps are shown in red. The red area denotes the territory captured by Germany between 10 and 16 May 1940.

On 10 May 1940, the Phoney War—the period of inactivity on the Western Front since the start of the conflict—ended as the German military invaded Belgium and the Netherlands. As a result, most of the BEF along with the best French armies and their strategic reserves moved forward to assist the Belgian and Dutch armies. While these forces attempted to stem the tide of the German advance, the main German assault pushed through the Ardennes Forest and crossed the River Meuse. This initiated the Battle of Sedan and threatened to split the Allied armies in two, separating those in Belgium from the rest of the French military along the Franco-German border. The 46th Division was ordered to concentrate on the Belgian border, to act as a reserve to the BEF. As the German threat developed, Gort created an ad hoc force known as Macforce. This force was to protect the BEF's right-rear flank and lines of communication, and prevent the Germans from crossing the River Scarpe. (Note: This force was commanded by Major-General Noel Mason-MacFarlane, who was director of military intelligence for the BEF, and consisted of the 127th Infantry Brigade, artillery, engineers, the 1st Army Tank Brigade, and other supporting units.)

On 15 May, the 138th and the 139th Brigades boarded trains and moved east. The men expected to be assigned to rear-area duties, such as clearing supply lines of refugees. However, once they arrived the next day, they were assigned to Macforce, and ordered to take up defensive positions along the Scarpe. These positions were occupied on 20 May, and the river was found to be less than 3 feet (0.91 metres) deep and not a defensible position. The 137th Brigade and the divisional headquarters arrived in the Seclin area, on the outskirts of Lille, on 20 May. There, the division took command of the 25th Infantry Brigade and other assets assigned by Gort, and were dubbed Polforce (after the town of St Pol where the units were waiting). These two brigades were assigned to defend the La Bassée Canal between Aire and Carvin, a front of 28 miles (45 kilometres), on the flank of Macforce. With insufficient forces to cover the entire area, they had to defend and prepare to destroy 44 bridges. The stream of refugees moving through the area impeded this duty. The water obstacles posed the only natural barrier between the advancing German armour forces and the rear of the BEF, and potential catastrophic defeat.

With assets being moved between Polforce and Macforce, the division was unable to fight as a cohesive entity. The divisional history, written by division staff, stated the brigades fought "confused, independent and one-sided" battles. Most notably, they record the 137th Brigade suffering "grievous casualties" when German forces broke through their positions on the La Bassée Canal. Meanwhile, with the BEF surrounded and the military situation in Flanders having deteriorated, the decision was made to evacuate the BEF from Dunkirk, the only remaining port in British hands. The remnants of the division's brigades retreated north towards the port. On 29 May, the division was assigned to defensive positions along the Canal de Bergues and Nieuwpoort-Dunkirk Canal, on the Dunkirk perimeter. On 1 June, the division faced a major German attack, which involved bitter fighting, artillery barrages and heavy casualties. During the day, the division withdrew into Dunkirk and was subsequently evacuated via the mole or from the beaches. The 2/4KOYLI, the 2/6DWR, and the 2/7DWR had become separated from the division during the move from Rennes and were located on the southern side of the German advance into France. As they were unable to retreat towards or evacuate from Dunkirk, these battalions retreated west across France, with the 2/4KOYLI being heavily engaged in the defence of bridges crossing the Seine at Pont-de-l'Arche. These battalions eventually reached Cherbourg and Saint-Nazaire, and were evacuated as part of Operation Aerial.

=== Home defence ===
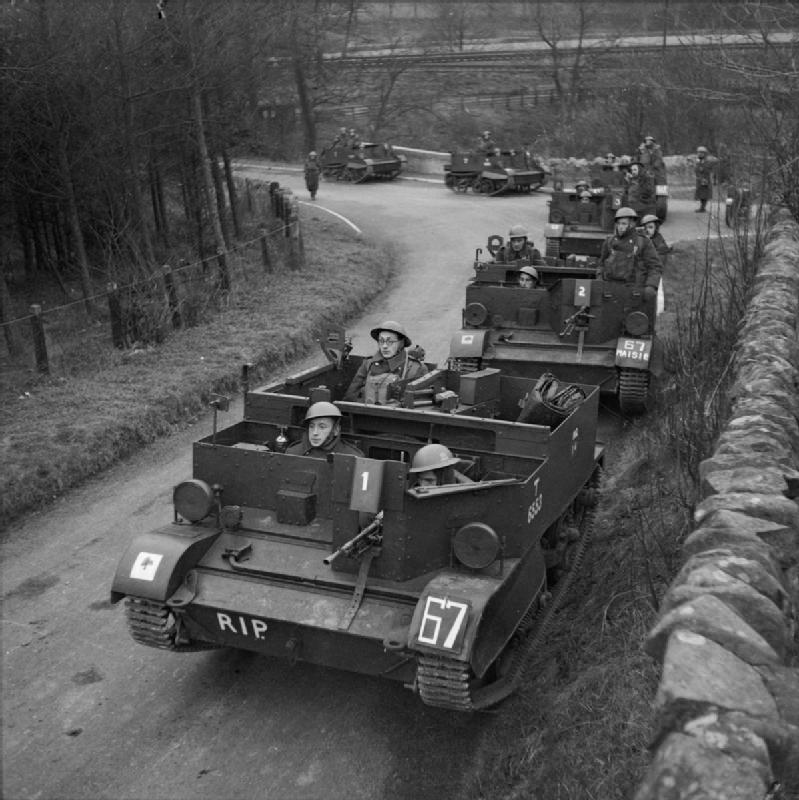
Universal Carriers of the 2/5th Battalion, Leicestershire Regiment in Scotland, 5 December 1940

After returning to the United Kingdom, the division moved to Manchester, and the process of rebuilding it began. Curtis was reassigned to the 49th Division, and replaced by Major-General Desmond Anderson (previously the GOC of the 45th Infantry Division) on 5 July. In late July, the division relocated to Scotland and was placed under the authority of Scottish Command. The Royal Artillery field regiments from the 49th Division were then assigned to the division, replacing those that were detached prior to the 46th Division's departure to France. This was followed by the engineer, signal, and other support units being brought up to full strength. The divisional history claims, "within little more than a month of Dunkirk", the division "was better equipped than it had ever been in the dark days in France". On 27 July, Lieutenant-General Alan Brooke, the commander-in-chief, Home Forces, visited the division. He recorded in his diary that he found the division "in a lamentably backward state of training, barely fit to do platoon training and deficient of officers".

The division was based initially along the Fife coastline, to prevent any potential German landings, before it moved to Dumfries. There the division trained for the remainder of 1940. On 14 December, Anderson was promoted to lieutenant-general and replaced by Major-General Charles Edward Hudson as GOC; Hudson was a distinguished First World War veteran and a recipient of the Victoria Cross (VC), who had previously commanded the 2nd Infantry Brigade during the fighting in France. In January 1941, the division left Scotland and travelled to Cambridgeshire. Subsequently, it moved to Norfolk where it undertook varying duties alongside training; anti-invasion duties that included manning coastal defences, airfield defence, and training Home Guard battalions. The division also conducted field exercises across East Anglia.

On 22 May, Major-General Douglas Wimberley briefly took command of the division, after Hudson was demoted on the grounds of being unfit for command of a division. (Note: Hudson's son, quoting from material left behind by his father, argued that this was the result of personal differences between him and his Corps commander Lieutenant-General Edmund Osborne.) In June, Major-General Miles Dempsey replaced Wimberley, who was reassigned to command the 51st (Highland) Infantry Division. On 24 June, Brooke inspected the division again and noted the improvement in the soldiers' training since his last visit. At the end of October, Dempsey was assigned to the 42nd (East Lancashire) Infantry Division to lead it during its conversion into an armoured division. Dempsey was replaced by Major-General Harold Freeman-Attwood, and the division moved to Kent in November. In Kent, the division established a 'Battle School', and spent the remainder of 1941 and the majority of 1942 training and undertaking exercises. During this period, the division was brought up to full strength. Notably, the division conducted an exercise on Lewes Downs that was watched by Lieutenant General Dwight D. Eisenhower. (Note: The Battle School was a two-week training course, which included observing and practising fieldcraft, undertaking tactical exercises without troops, and engaging in battle drill in realistic conditions. The historian David French wrote, "Its purpose was to offer soldiers some experience of the noise and chaos of battle by giving them the opportunity to train under live-firing conditions.") On 19 July, the 137th Brigade left, temporarily reducing the division to two brigades. The 128th Infantry Brigade replaced it on 15 August. This brigade was composed of the 1/4th Battalion, Hampshire Regiment (1/4HR), the 2/4HR, and the 5HR.

During late 1941 and through into 1942, British military planners considered a landing in French North Africa and subsequent advance into Tunisia. After various inceptions, Operation Torch was crafted and the British First Army formed. On 24 August, the division was assigned to the First Army, but was not allocated to the initial invasion. Instead, the division remained in the United Kingdom. It assembled at Aldershot in December, and was also inspected by King George VI.

=== Tunisia ===
Key locations in Tunisia, in reference to division's actions.

On 24 December 1942, 4,000 men of the 139th Infantry Brigade and supporting forces (Note: The 70th Field Regiment, Royal Artillery (RA); the 229th Anti-Tank Battery, RA; the 379th Light AA Battery, RA; the 270th Field Company, Royal Engineers; the 183rd Field Ambulance, Royal Army Medical Corps; the 139th Brigade Company, Royal Army Service Corps; the 139th Brigade, Royal Electrical and Mechanical Engineers; and C Squadron, 46th Reconnaissance Regiment, Reconnaissance Corps.) departed from Liverpool. The convoy arrived in Algiers, French Algeria, on 3 January 1943, followed by a 500-mile (800 km) road and rail journey to the frontline near Sedjenane, French Tunisia. Meanwhile, on 6 January, the 128th Brigade departed from Gourock, Scotland, and the 138th Brigade departed from Liverpool. They arrived in Algeria on 17 January. While the 138th moved across land, the 128th Brigade re-boarded ships and were transported further down the Algerian coast to Bône. During this move, an Axis air attack resulted in one ship being sunk and the loss of materiel. Both brigades moved up to the front during February.

On 10 January, the 139th Infantry Brigade launched a minor attack upon Italian positions, but an Axis offensive postponed further efforts. The Italian-German forces struck at Allied positions in western Tunisia to gain more favourable defensive positions from which to contend with the expected Allied offensive. This offensive began with the Battle of Sidi Bou Zid, aimed at largely American positions. The Axis offensive expanded with the Battle of Kasserine Pass. In response, the 2/5LR, along with anti-tank guns and artillery pieces from the 139th Brigade, were moved 150 miles (240 km) south to Thala to bolster Allied positions. Once there, they covered the withdrawal of American and British forces, repulsed a German tank attack late on 20 February after heavy fighting that saw German units penetrate their position and aided in the subsequent defence of the town. The fighting cost these units over 400 casualties. To the north, patrols from the 5HR (128th Infantry Brigade) clashed with their German counterparts near Sidi Nsir.

On 26 February, the 5HR became embroiled in the opening moves of Operation Ochsenkopf, another major German attack. Ochsenkopf aimed to capture the town of Béja. After a 24-hour battle, which included three German tanks being disabled, the battalion was reduced to 120 men and forced back. The following day, the Germans attacked towards Hunt's Gap where the reinforced 128th Brigade (including the Churchill tank-equipped North Irish Horse) was concentrated. Fighting raged until 3 March, by which time the brigade had halted the German effort to capture Béja and destroyed at least 11 tanks. At the same time, on 26 February, Axis forces advanced into the Sedjenane valley, held by the 139th Brigade, initiating the Battle of Sedjenane. Notably, on 2 March, the 16th Durham Light Infantry (16DLI) launched a counterattack that failed with heavy casualties. By 4 March, the brigade had been forced to withdraw. During the following two weeks, the brigade launched local counterattacks and engaged in further back-and-forth fighting in isolated company and battalion actions. Starting on 27 March, the division launched larger counterattacks to regain the Sedjenane valley. During this, the division took temporary command of the 1st Parachute and the 38th (Irish) Brigades. They, alongside the 138th Brigade, retook all the territory that had been lost by 1 April, as well around 1,000 prisoners.

On 2 April, the 128th Brigade moved 100 miles (160 km) south to assist in an attack towards Pichon, near Kairouan. This was part of a larger effort to intercept Axis forces retreating north, from the south of Tunisia where they were being chased by the British Eighth Army. The resulting fighting was a success for the brigade who took 150 prisoners, but the overall attack failed to trap Axis forces. They marched north to rejoin the main body of the division on 14 April. The division was next tasked with capturing hills northeast of Bou Arada to open the way for an armoured advance towards Tunis. On 21 April, Axis forces launched a minor spoiling attack that was repelled before the division attacked. Over the next two days, in heavy fighting, the division took its objectives. Further back-and-forth fighting followed as the division was called upon to clear additional Axis positions. Fighting ended on 27 April and so did the division's role in the campaign. On 20 May, elements of the 46th took part in the victory parade in Tunis.

The division was not allocated to the Allied invasion of Sicily and remained in Tunisia. In June, the division took part in Exercise Conqueror, a training exercise, where it opposed an amphibious landing conducted by the United States 1st Infantry Division. This was followed by the 46th conducting amphibious landing training, as it was assigned to Operation Buttress, a proposed landing across the Strait of Messina on mainland Italy. This operation did not occur, and the division was allotted to Operation Avalanche; the Allied invasion of mainland Italy at Salerno. In August, the division undertook Exercise Dryshod as a final rehearsal for this landing. During the exercise, a truck containing land mines exploded, killing 15 men and injuring around 30 more. On 25 August, Major-General John Hawkesworth took command.

=== Italian campaign ===
==== Salerno beachhead ====
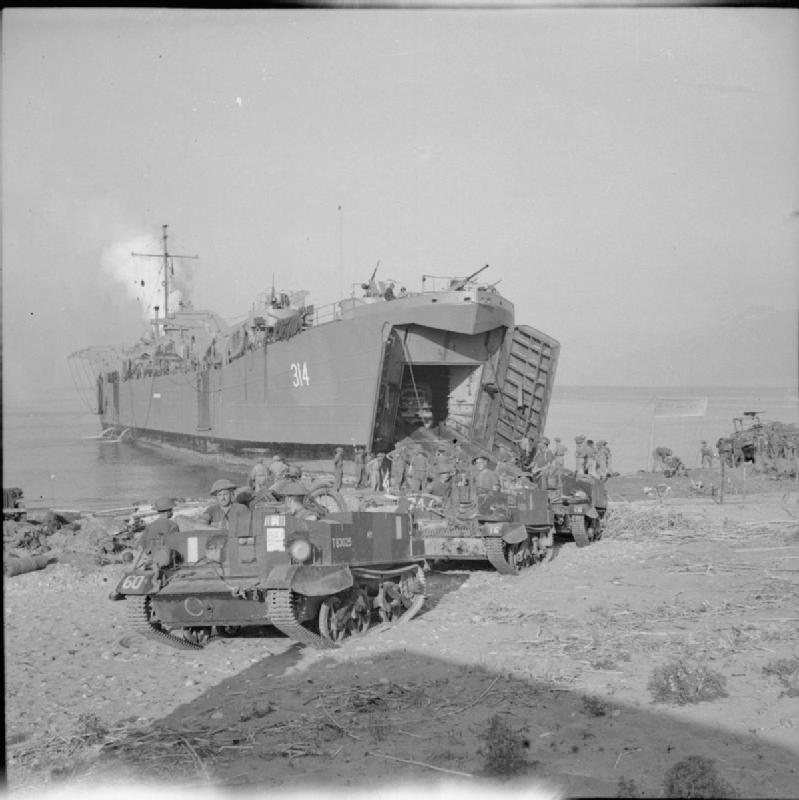
Universal Carriers of the 6th Battalion, Lincolnshire Regiment drive ashore from a Landing Ship, Tank at Salerno, 8 September 1943.

The division embarked and sailed from Africa on 7 September, assigned to the British X Corps, part of the US Fifth Army. The division was to land near Salerno and capture it and then assist in the capture of the port of Naples. En route, the Luftwaffe attacked the convoy, with one ship hit. The next day, the Armistice of Cassibile, the Italian surrender, was announced. As the ships neared shore, they were engaged by German artillery. Supported by a naval bombardment, the division landed under the cover of dark with at least one battalion landed in the wrong area. Mines and German resistance impeded the advance from the beach, and during the day the 16th Panzer Division launched counterattacks with tanks and self-propelled guns. By the end of the day, Salerno had been captured, and the division had suffered 350 casualties. (Note: The divisional history claimed that Italian coastal batteries opened fire after the armistice was announced. The British campaign official history states that there were no fixed coastal batteries in the division's area, and that German artillery fire "may have caused an exaggerated estimate of their nature, number, and effect".) Over the next two weeks, fierce fighting occurred as the Germans launched a major counterattack by six divisions against the various Allied landing zones. In the 46th Division's sector, the counterattack was conducted by the Hermann Göring Panzer Division, the 3rd Panzergrenadier Division, and the 15th Panzergrenadier Division. The fighting saw ongoing artillery fire on the 46th's landing zone and support ships, Royal Navy shell fire against German positions, tank attacks, back-and-forth fighting, hand-to-hand combat and bayonet charges. In places, the division was forced back, but Salerno was held throughout. By 13 September, the ongoing heavy fighting made the Allied commanders consider withdrawing the landed troops. Particularly heavy fighting occurred for a hill near Salerno dubbed White Cross Hill. A German attack forced the division off the hill, which was followed by repeated failed counterattacks. Having only been retaken once, the Germans withdrew. Other major attacks were launched upon the division and repulsed. By 16 September, the German counterattack ended and their forces began to withdraw.

==== Volturno Line to the Winter Line ====
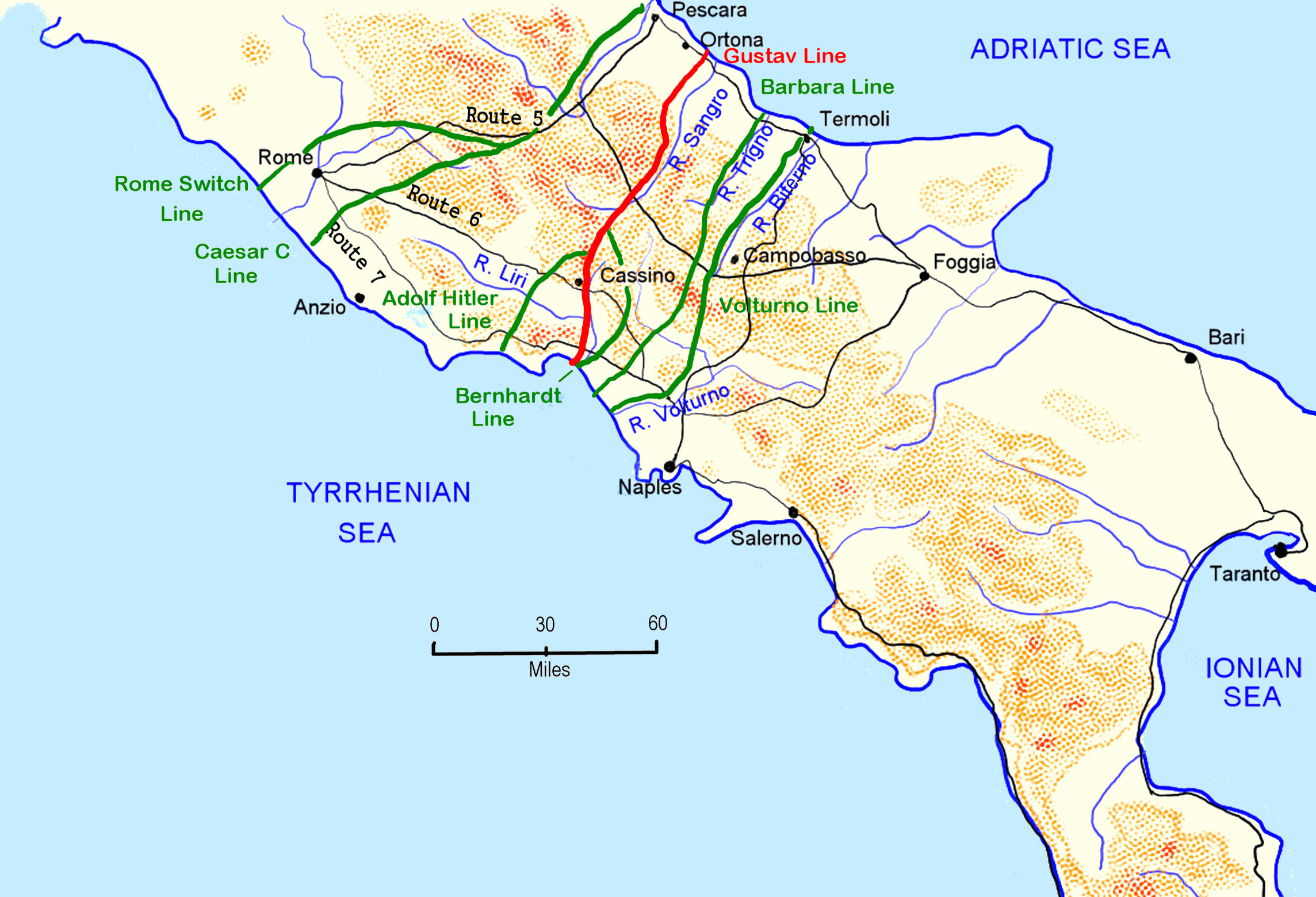
Map of Italy showing the various German defensive lines that were created to impede the Allied advance north

On 22 September, the division advanced north, and captured several villages and hills after overcoming German resistance. This helped clear the way for the 7th Armoured Division to be employed. They began their advance on 28 September and entered Naples on 1 October. During September, drafts were brought in to replace the 46th Division's casualties. Some of these drafts mutinied, in what became known as the Salerno mutiny, because they were not being reassigned to their former units.

In October, the division attacked the German Volturno Line, based along the River Volturno. An initial bridgehead was captured on 6 October, but the main attack did not occur for another six days. Hugging the coastline, the division seized additional crossings. By 15 October, it had advanced 4 miles (6.4 km) beyond the river to a series of canals that formed the main defensive position of the 15th Panzergrenadier Division. This obstacle was overcome by 18 October, and bridges were constructed. Due to the success achieved by the 56th (London) Infantry Division, near Capua, the 46th Division was moved further inland. They launched new attacks on 29 October, which breached the Barbara Line. Sessa was taken on 1 November, and they reached the Garigliano River the next day. On 1 December, the division launched its first attack on the Bernhardt Line. This attack was diversionary, to assist the 56th Division in their main effort, and involved a failed attempt to take the village of Calabritto. German troops, dug-in around the village, repulsed the division, and it was not until the 56th Division cleared the nearby high ground that the 46th was able to capture the village on 6 December.

The next series of battles were efforts to breach the Winter Line and became part of the opening phase of the Battle of Monte Cassino. On 19 January 1944, the division made three attempts to cross the Garigliano, at the confluence of the rivers Liri and Gari. The swift current and German resistance defeated these efforts. DUKWs, which had been available, had been withdrawn for training exercises to prepare for the upcoming landing at Anzio and were sorely missed. While the division's attack failed, it helped in drawing vital German reinforcements towards it and away from the Anzio area. The failed attack potentially hindered an American attack that occurred the next day, during the Battle of Rapido River, as the 46th had not captured vital terrain on the American southern flank. The 56th (London) Infantry Division, to the 46th's south, had secured a bridgehead across the Garigliano and the 46th Division crossed the river. On the night of 26/27 January, the division launched an attack into the Aurunci Mountains near Castelforte. The fighting continued until 10 February, by which point the division had captured a series of hilltops and helped push back the German 94th Infantry Division.

On 16 March, the division left Italy and arrived six days later in Egypt. At the end of the month, the division moved to Palestine, where it remained until June. During this time, the division refitted, rested, trained and took on almost 3,000 replacements, replacing the casualties it had suffered.

==== Gothic Line ====
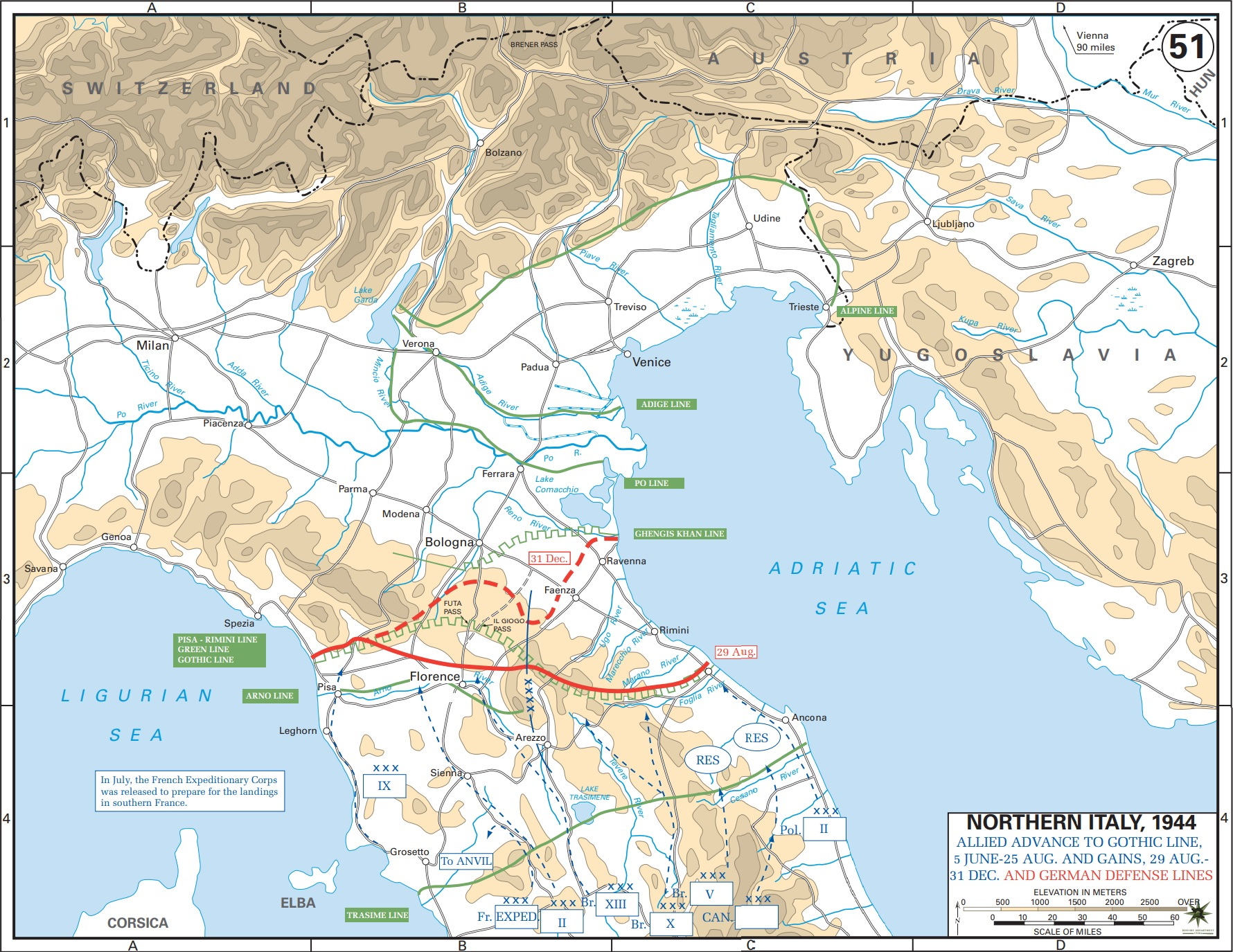
Map of Italy, depicting the Gothic Line and the Allied advances

The division left Palestine on 17 June 1944 and returned to Egypt to board ships for Italy. The division landed in Italy on 3 July and was assigned to the V Corps of the British Eighth Army. It then took up position near Bevagna. In August, the Eighth Army developed Operation Olive, which called for the army to break through the Gothic Line and enter the Po Valley.

On 25 August, the division (along with the majority of the Eighth Army) attacked. After steady progress, the division captured a series of villages and hills around Montegridolfo on 31 August. On the final day of the fighting, Lieutenant Gerard Norton eliminated two German positions by himself and was subsequently awarded the VC. On 2 September, the division repulsed a German armoured counterattack. Over the following days, the division mopped up the area and fended off further German counterattacks. By 4 September, the division had advanced and seized bridgeheads and nearby high ground across the River Conca. This allowed other elements of V Corps to advance forward, and division was allowed a period of rest.

On 10 September, the division attacked to clear the high ground on the Eighth Army's western flank. This fighting included a two-day battle for Gemmano, which changed hands several times. Monte Colombo was captured soon after. On 15 September, the division made at least three assaults on Montescudo, with the village falling only after the Germans withdrew. Over the following days, the division pushed forward and cleared various ridges and villages held by German forces. They then brushed passed the border of the Republic of San Marino and captured Verucchio on 21 September. During the rest of September, the division continued its advance and fought a heavily contested battle to seize a ridge beyond the River Marecchia. Weather then impeded progress, causing a one day delay in the crossing a river on 29 September, and then a six-day delay in the crossing of the Fiumicino. Throughout October, the division fought a series of river-crossing actions that also required the ridges and hills beyond to be captured. During this period, the division was opposed by the 114th Jäger Division. On 20 October, Cesena was captured, and the division linked up with the Italian resistance movement. The division was then rested. After an advance of 60 miles (97 km) since 25 August, the division had crossed ten rivers and had taken 2,000 prisoners.

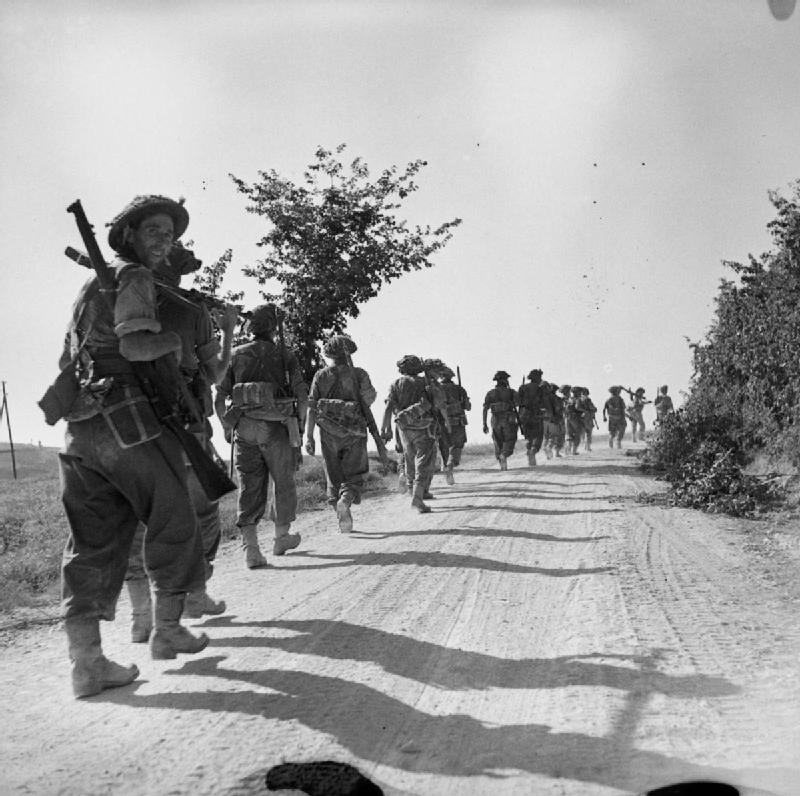
Elements of the 2nd Hampshire Regiment, 27 August 1944.

On 6 November 1944, Major-General Stephen Weir, a New Zealand Military Forces officer who had commanded the 2nd New Zealand Division previously, became GOC. (Note: Weir held the distinction of being the only soldier, from the Commonwealth of Nations, to command a British division during the war.) The division returned to action the next day and helped clear the outskirts of Forlì. Faced by the 26th Panzer and the 356th Infantry Divisions, the 46th fought another series of river-crossing actions through 20 November. On 3 December, after several days of preparation, the division advanced across the River Lamone and battled with the German 305th Infantry Division over the following four days. Under the cover of dark, on 9 December, the German 90th Panzergrenadier Division launched a counterattack. Heavy fighting would rage through to the next day before the German attack was repulsed. During this counterattack, Captain John Brunt conducted an aggressive defence during two actions and helped retrieve wounded men who had been stranded between the lines. These actions resulted in him posthumously earning the VC, as he was killed the following day. From the landing at Salerno to the end of the campaign against the Gothic Line, the division suffered a total of 9,880 casualties. This included 1,447 killed, 6,476 wounded, and 1,957 missing. Between the two campaigns, the division captured 4,507 German soldiers.

=== Greece ===
At the end of August 1944, the majority of German military units in Greece began withdrawing because of the Soviet Union's offensive into Romania and the latter changing sides. This was followed shortly after by Bulgaria entering the war against Germany and the Yugoslav Partisans attacking German lines of communication. With German formations remaining only on a handful of Greek islands, the British moved forward with their plan to reoccupy the country. On 18 October, supported by British forces, the Greek government-in-exile returned to Athens; this was part of a larger geopolitical move to install a British-friendly, non-communist government in Greece. During the occupation, Britain had provided military support to the National Liberation Front (EAM), a combination of five socialist and communist parties, which controlled the large Greek People's Liberation Army (ELAS). In early 1944, the Greek Civil War broke out between the EAM's forces and the non-communist partisan movements, such as the National Republican Greek League (EDES). After the re-establishment of the Government of Greece, tensions rose, culminating with the EAM attempting to seize power in December and the British military becoming involved within the second phase of the Greek Civil War.

On 28 November, the 46th Division's 139th Brigade was pulled off the frontline in Italy, and dispatched to Greece to replace the 2nd Parachute Brigade that was due to move to Italy. The Brigade landed at Piraeus on 4 December and immediately secured the town's police stations. Over the following days, as the rest of the brigade landed, it secured the area and contended with snipers, small skirmishes, house-to-house searches, and a prolonged battle to secure the railway station. On 2 December, the 139th Brigade's 5th Battalion, Sherwood Foresters was airlifted to Sedes Air Base. They entered Salonika and guarded vulnerable points, including Red Cross supply depots; no fighting occurred. As fighting increased in Athens, Lieutenant-General Ronald Scobie, commander of British forces in Greece, requested the rest of the 46th Division be dispatched to help restore order. The 139th Brigade was transported to Patras and landed on 10 January 1945. The ELAS forces in the city were ordered to withdraw, which they did, allowing the 139th Brigade to secure the area without bloodshed. Two days later, the brigade secured nearby Araxos airfield after an artillery demonstration against lingering ELAS forces. On 15 January, a ceasefire was announced that ended the second phase of fighting.

On 6 January, the remainder of the 46th Division arrived at Taranto, Italy. Over the next eight weeks, the division was transported piecemeal to Greece. On 18 January, the divisional reconnaissance regiment, supported by engineers and two infantry companies from the 128th Brigade, moved to Corinth and then on to Argos and Nauplion. The rest of the brigade arrived in the eastern Peloponnese towards the end of January and were made responsible for the Argolis and Corinthia Prefecture. At the end of January, the 138th Brigade arrived in Patras to relieve the 139th Brigade, who moved to the outskirts of Athens. On 8 February, the Foresters moved from Salonika to Athens. In addition to guard and security duties, the division seized weapons from ELAS caches, assisted in transporting disbanded ELAS troops home, and trained. In March, the division expanded its operations into the rest of the Peloponnese peninsula, Ithaca, and Epirus. Most of the division's activities during this period were peaceful, with a notable exception being a skirmish at Corinth, when ELAS members were found attempting to smuggle weapons towards Athens. On 5 April, the division was relieved by the 23rd Armoured Brigade and began the return to Italy on 7 April although it took to the middle of the month until the entire division was available.

=== Post War ===
By the time the division arrived, the Allied Spring 1945 offensive in Italy had already begun. The division was not expected to be ready for action until 13 May. On 2 May, Axis forces in Italy surrendered. Six days later, the war in Europe ended. The division then moved into Austria as part of the Allied occupation force. One of the division's first duties, during May and June, was to assist in the repatriation of Yugoslav nationals who had served in the German military to Yugoslavia to be tried. The division was then assigned to the province of Styria and arrived in July following the withdrawal of Soviet forces. Some elements of the division, such as the 16DLI, advanced into the Austrian capital of Vienna. In the coming months, elements of the division were disbanded. For example, the 16DLI was stood down over January and February 1946.

During 1946, the division took part in Operation Keelhaul, which included the forced repatriation of Cossacks to the Soviet Union. The author Ian Mitchell wrote the division was ordered, on 26 May, "to provide 'static picquets' along the route the Cossacks were to travel". Mitchell stated the 138th Brigade was informed that "the return of the Cossacks to Russia is part of an international agreement", many were wanted for war crimes, and "any Cossack who escapes will be a menace to British troops stationed in the area". The men of the division were ordered "to capture or shoot any Cossack" who attempted escape, but were to avoid any potential mass shootings. The historian and writer Giles MacDonogh wrote the division, along with the 78th, were engaged in "some ugly scenes" once the Cossacks and their families realised what was happening; "Tommies used rifles, bayonets and pickaxe handles to convince them to board the lorries that would take them to the frontier." These efforts resulted in 900 German officers being turned over to the Soviets, among them Helmuth von Pannwitz who was later executed for the many war crimes committed by the Cossacks under his command.

In 1947, the division was disbanded as part of the demobilisation of the British army. The TA was reformed that year, on a much smaller scale of nine divisions, which did not include the 46th Infantry Division. (Note: The 16th Airborne Division, the 49th (West Riding) and the 56th (London) Armoured Divisions, as well as the 42nd (Lancashire), the 43rd (Wessex), the 44th (Home Counties), the 50th (Northumbrian), the 51st/52nd (Scottish), and the 53rd (Welsh) infantry divisions.)

== General officers commanding ==
The division had the following GOCs during the Second World War:

Appointed	General officer commanding
2 October 1939	Major-General Algernon Ransome
5 December 1939	Major-General Henry O. Curtis
5 June 1940	Brigadier John Gawthorpe (Acting)
5 July 1940	Major-General Desmond Anderson
14 December 1940	Major-General Charles Edward Hudson
22 May 1941	Major-General Douglas Wimberley
15 June 1941	Major-General Miles Dempsey
28 October 1941	Brigadier Thomas Daly (Acting)
3 November 1941	Major-General Harold Freeman-Attwood
25 August 1943	Major-General John Hawkesworth
28 April 1944	Brigadier Geoffrey Harding (Acting)
29 May 1944	Major-General John Hawkesworth
6 November 1944	Major-General Stephen Weir
7 September 1946	Unknown interim acting GOC
8 October 1946	Major-General John Frederick Boyce Combe

== Order of battle ==
46th Infantry Division (1939–1945)

137th Infantry Brigade (until 19 July 1942)

- 2/5th Battalion, West Yorkshire Regiment
- 2/6th Battalion, Duke of Wellington's Regiment
- 2/7th Battalion, Duke of Wellington's Regiment
- 137th Infantry Brigade Anti-Tank Company (formed 12 July 1940, until 28 November 1941)

138th Infantry Brigade

- 6th Battalion, Lincolnshire Regiment
- 2/4th Battalion, King's Own Yorkshire Light Infantry
- 6th Battalion, York and Lancaster Regiment
- 138th Infantry Brigade Anti-Tank Company (formed 22 July 1940, until 10 July 1941)

139th Infantry Brigade

- 2/5th Battalion, Leicestershire Regiment
- 2/5th Battalion, Sherwood Foresters (renamed 5th Battalion, Sherwood Foresters effective 1 March 1943)
- 9th Battalion, Sherwood Foresters (until 28 December 1940)
- 139th Infantry Brigade Anti-Tank Company (formed 17 August 1940, until 10 July 1941)
- 16th Battalion, Durham Light Infantry (from 28 December 1940)

128th Infantry Brigade (from 15 August 1942)

- 1/4th Battalion, Hampshire Regiment
- 2/4th Battalion, Hampshire Regiment (left 9 May 1943)
- 5th Battalion, Hampshire Regiment
- 2nd Battalion Hampshire Regiment (from 10 May 1943)

Divisional Troops

- 46th Divisional artillery, Royal Artillery
  - 121st (West Riding) Field Regiment (left 12 July 1940)
  - 122nd (West Riding) Field Regiment (left 12 July 1940)
  - 123rd (West Riding) Field Regiment (left 12 July 1940)
  - 70th (West Riding) Field Regiment (from 30 July 1940)
  - 71st (West Riding) Field Regiment (from 30 July 1940)
  - 51st (Westmorland and Cumberland) Field Regiment (from 30 July 1940, left 16 September 1940)
  - 151st (Ayrshire Yeomanry) Field Regiment (from 16 September 1940, left 10 May 1942)
  - 172nd Field Regiment (from 11 May 1942)
  - 68th Anti-Tank Regiment (until 30 June 1940)
  - 58th (The Duke of Wellington's) Anti-Tank Regiment (from 30 July 1940)
  - 115th (East Yorks) Light Anti-Aircraft Regiment (from 24 February 1942 until 8 November 1944)
- 46th Divisional engineers, Royal Engineers
  - 270th Field Company
  - 271st Field Company
  - 272nd Field Company
  - 273rd Field Park Company
  - 201st Bridging Platoon (from 4 April 1944)
- 46th Divisional Signals, Royal Corps of Signals
- 46th Battalion, Reconnaissance Corps (formed 11 July 1941, redesignated 46th Regiment, Reconnaissance Corps on 6 June 1942, left 31 December 1943) (Note: In June 1942, the Reconnaissance Corps universally adopted cavalry nomenclature. As a result, all battalions were redesignated as regiments.)
- 46th Regiment, Royal Armoured Corps (from 1 January 1944)
- 2/7th Battalion, Middlesex Regiment (Divisional machine gun battalion; from 11 November 1941, left 1 October 1942)
- 2nd Battalion, Royal Northumberland Fusiliers (Divisional support battalion; from 3 July 1943, until 10 March 1944)
- 9th Battalion, Manchester Regiment (Divisional machine gun battalion; from 15 July 1944)

== See also ==
- British Army during the Second World War
- List of British divisions in World War II
- British Army Order of Battle (September 1939)

== Notes ==
Footnotes

Citations
