= Desmond Anderson =

British Army general (1885–1967)

Lieutenant-General Sir Desmond Anderson KBE CB CMG DSO
- Anderson in 1941
- Born: 5 July 1885
- Died: 29 January 1967 (aged 81)
- Military career
- Allegiance: United Kingdom
- Branch: British Army
- Service years: 1905–1944
- Rank: Lieutenant-General
- Service number: 8403
- Units: Devonshire Regiment; East Yorkshire Regiment
- Commands: II Corps (1943–1944); III Corps (1940–1943); 46th Infantry Division (1940); 45th Infantry Division (1940); 1st Battalion, East Yorkshire Regiment (1927–1931)
- Conflicts: First World War; Second World War
- Awards: Knight Commander of the Order of the British Empire; Companion of the Order of the Bath; Companion of the Order of St Michael and St George; Companion of the Distinguished Service Order; Mentioned in Despatches (4); Legion of Honour (France); Order of Saint Stanislaus (Russia)
- Other work: Colonel, The East Yorkshire Regiment (The Duke of York's Own) (1940–1948); Trustee of the Imperial War Museum (1945–1956)

Lieutenant-General Sir Desmond Francis Anderson, KBE, CB, CMG, DSO (5 July 1885 – 29 January 1967) was a senior British Army officer in both the First and the Second World Wars.

== Early life and First World War ==
Anderson was born in Dunham Massey and attended Rugby College before entering the Royal Military College, Sandhurst, where he was commissioned as a second lieutenant into the Devonshire Regiment in 1905. He transferred to the East Yorkshire Regiment in 1910. He served as the adjutant of the 1st Battalion, East Yorkshire Regiment from 1912.

Following the outbreak of the First World War, Anderson went with the battalion to the Western Front in 1914, where he served until July 1917 in a number of combat and staff roles, including as a GSO3 in May 1915, during which time he was wounded and appointed a Companion of the Distinguished Service Order in February 1915. A captain in 1916, he fought in the Battle of the Somme as a company commander of Company 'C', he was mentioned in despatches four times and in 1920 received the French Legion of Honour for his wartime service. On 10 March 1918 he was appointed as a GSO2.

== Between the wars ==
After attending staff college, Anderson was appointed a GSO2 with London District. He was appointed CO of the 1st Battalion East Yorkshire Regiment in 1927, Assistant Quartermaster General at Aldershot Command in June 1932 and General Staff Officer Grade 1 at 5th Division in 1933. He went on to be Deputy Director of Military Operations & Intelligence at the War Office in 1934, Deputy Director of Military Intelligence at the War Office in 1936, an appointment he relinquished on 12 January 1938 when he was placed on half-pay. He was then Major-General in charge of Administration for Eastern Command in 1938.

== Second World War ==
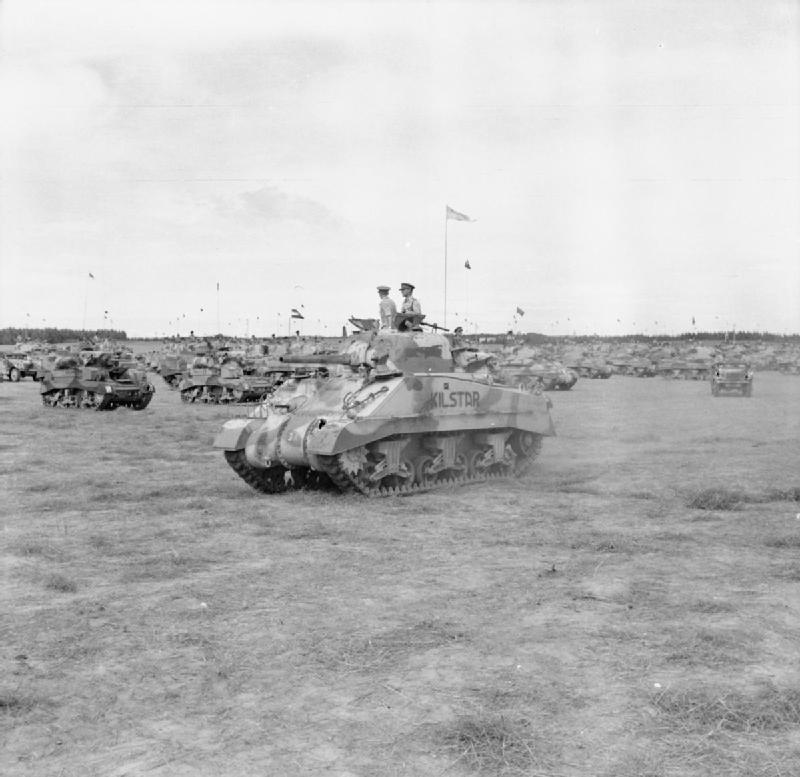
Sherman tanks of the 9th Armoured Brigade on parade at Hadeira in Palestine, 30 October 1943. Anderson, GOC III Corps, took the salute from the Sherman tank in the foreground.

At the outbreak of the Second World War, Anderson was major-general on the General Staff for the Home Forces. He became General Officer Commanding 45th Infantry Division in early 1940 and then spent a few months as Assistant Chief of the Imperial General Staff at the War Office before becoming General Officer Commanding 46th Division in June 1940.

Anderson was promoted to command III Corps in December 1940. During 1942 he went to Baghdad, where III Corps were part of Persia and Iraq Command's Tenth Army. In 1943 he transferred to command II Corps and he retired from the army in 1944.

== See also ==
- Iraqforce
- Desmond Anderson Primary School

== Bibliography ==
- Smart, Nick (2005). Biographical Dictionary of British Generals of the Second World War. Barnesley: Pen & Sword. ISBN 1844150496.

Military offices
Preceded by Frederick Witts	GOC 45th Infantry Division; February–May 1940	Succeeded by Edmond Schreiber
Preceded by Arthur Percival	Assistant Chief of the Imperial General Staff; May–July 1940	Succeeded by Gordon Macready
Preceded by Henry Curtis	GOC 46th Infantry Division; July–December 1940	Succeeded by Charles Hudson
Preceded by James Marshall-Cornwall	GOC III Corps; 1940–1943	Succeeded by Ronald Scobie
Preceded by Herbert Lumsden	GOC II Corps; 1943–1944	Post disbanded
Honorary titles
Preceded by John Louis Justice Clarke	Colonel of the East Yorkshire Regiment (The Duke of York's Own); 1940–1948	Succeeded by Robert John Springhall
