= Henry Curtis (British Army officer) =

British Army general (1888–1964)

Major-General Henry Curtis CB DSO MC DL
- Born: 18 November 1888
- Died: 28 January 1964 (aged 75)
- Burial place: Lytchett Minster Parish Churchyard, Purbeck District, Dorset, England
- Spouse: Jean Mackenzie Low
- Relatives: Daniel Sargent Curtis (grandfather); Ralph Wormeley Curtis (uncle)
- Military career
- Allegiance: United Kingdom
- Branch: British Army
- Service years: 1908–1946
- Rank: Major-General
- Nickname: "Squeak"
- Service number: 4309
- Unit: King's Royal Rifle Corps
- Commands: Aldershot Command (1944–1945); Salisbury Plain District (1943–1944); 49th (West Riding) Infantry Division (1940–1943); 46th Infantry Division (1939–1940); 3rd Infantry Brigade (1938–1939); 1st Battalion, King's Royal Rifle Corps (1931–1934); 4th Battalion, King's Royal Rifle Corps (c. 1918–1919)
- Conflicts: First World War; Second World War
- Awards: Companion of the Order of the Bath; Distinguished Service Order; Military Cross; Mentioned in Despatches (3); Army Distinguished Service Medal (United States)

Major-General Henry Osborne Curtis, CB, DSO, MC, DL (18 November 1888 – 28 January 1964) was a British Army officer who saw service in both the First and the Second World Wars. During the latter, he commanded the 46th Infantry Division during the Battle of France in 1940, and later the 49th (West Riding) Infantry Division during the Occupation of Iceland from 1940 to 1942.

== Early life ==
Curtis was born 18 November 1888. He was the son of Osborne Sargent Curtis, an American-born graduate of Trinity College, Cambridge, and Frances Henrietta Gandy. His paternal uncle was the artist Ralph Wormeley Curtis (1854–1922) and his grandfather was the American lawyer and banker, Daniel Sargent Curtis (1825–1908).

== Military career ==
After being educated at Eton College, Curtis attended the Royal Military College, Sandhurst, from where he was commissioned in the King's Royal Rifle Corps (KRRC) in 1908. He saw service during the First World War in France, Salonika and in Palestine. He was mentioned in despatches three times and wounded three times; he was awarded the Military Cross in 1917, and the Distinguished Service Order in 1919, and ended the conflict as a battalion commander, commanding the 4th Battalion, KRRC.

Soon afterwards, in 1920, Curtis attended the Staff College, Quetta, and served from 1922 to 1926 with the headquarters of Middle East Command, before returning to the United Kingdom to serve on the directing staff at the Staff College, Camberley. He returned to regimental duty when he was assigned as commanding officer of the 1st Battalion, KRRC, a post he held from 1931 to 1934. From 1934 until 1936 he commanded British troops in Palestine before again returning to the United Kingdom and the Staff College, Camberley, again as an instructor. In 1938 he assumed command of the 3rd Infantry Brigade.

Curtis commanded the brigade, part of Major General Sir Harold Alexander's 1st Infantry Division, from 1938 to 1939. Handing over the brigade to Brigadier Thomas Wilson, a fellow KRRC officer, he was sent home from France in December 1939 and promoted to acting major general on 21 December (with seniority backdated to 18 July 1938), to assume command of the 46th Division. Curtis rejoined the British Expeditionary Force with his division in April 1940. Evacuated from Dunkirk, he was appointed to command the 49th (West Riding) Infantry Division in June 1940, which, at a reduced establishment, was detailed to occupy Iceland. Curtis spent the next two years in charge of his division from his office in Reykjavík. Made commander of Salisbury Plain District in 1943, he was appointed commander of the Hampshire District in 1944 and the Dorset District in 1945. He retired from the army in 1946.

The family donated his medals to the Royal Green Jackets Museum but, at some point, some of the original medals have been substituted and were found for sale on the open market.

== Personal life ==
Curtis was married to Jean Mackenzie Low (1894–1977), the daughter of John L. Low of Butterstone, Perthshire. He was the father of four sons, two of whom were killed in action, Richard Osborne Curtis (d. 1944) and Philip Evelyn Curtis (d. 1943).

== Bibliography ==
- Smart, Nick (2005). Biographical Dictionary of British Generals of the Second World War. Barnesley: Pen & Sword. ISBN 1844150496.

Military offices
| Preceded by Algernon Ransome | GOC 46th Infantry Division; 1939–1940 | Succeeded by Desmond Anderson |
| Preceded by Pierse Mackesy | GOC 49th (West Riding) Infantry Division; 1940–1943 | Succeeded by Evelyn Barker |
| Preceded by Charles Norman | GOC Aldershot District; 1944–1945 | Succeeded by Robert Ross |
