= Harold Freeman-Attwood =

British Army general (1897–1963)

Major-General Harold Freeman-Attwood DSO OBE MC
- Born: 30 December 1897
- Died: 22 September 1963 (aged 65)
- Military career
- Allegiance: United Kingdom
- Branch: British Army
- Service years: 1915–1943
- Rank: Major-General
- Service number: 13564
- Unit: Royal Welch Fusiliers
- Commands: 46th Infantry Division (1941–43); 141st (London) Infantry Brigade (1940–41); 5th London Brigade (1940)
- Conflicts: First World War; North-West Frontier; Second World War
- Awards: Distinguished Service Order; Officer of the Order of the British Empire; Military Cross

Major-General Harold Augustus Freeman-Attwood, DSO, OBE, MC (30 December 1897 – 22 September 1963) was a British Army officer who fought in both of the world wars.

== Early life and military career ==
Born Harold Freeman on 30 December 1897, he was the eldest son of Edward Freeman, a British Army officer, and Katherine Margaret. Freeman was educated at Summer Fields School, Marlborough College and, during the First World War, attended the Royal Military College, Sandhurst, where he graduated on 13 July 1915 and was subsequently commissioned as a second lieutenant into his father's regiment, the Royal Welch Fusiliers. He served with the 1st Battalion, Royal Welch Fusiliers, part of the 22nd Brigade of the 7th Division, a Regular Army unit, on the Western Front, where he was awarded the Military Cross (MC) during the Battle of Passchendaele in August 1917, the citation for which reads:

For conspicuous gallantry and devotion during three attacks, the third of which, mainly owing to his personal courage and resource, was successful. He set a magnificent example to all ranks.

Together with his battalion, he was sent to the Italian Front later in the year, where it remained until the end of the war in November 1918.

== Between the wars ==
Remaining in the army between the wars, Freeman married Jessie Job on 10 September 1921 and together they had three children; Harold Warren Freeman, born in 1923; Edward Augustus Carson, born in 1930; and Alice Avalon, born in 1932. He served with his regiment throughout the interwar period, mainly with the 1st Battalion, in operations in Wazaristan in the early 1920s before returning to the United Kingdom where he became adjutant to a Territorial Army (TA) battalion of his regiment from 1924 to 1928. He attended the Staff College, Camberley from 1928 to 1929. (Note: Fellow students at the Staff College included several future general officers, such as George Erskine, Hugh Stable, Herbert Lumsden, Ivor Hughes, Neil McKicking, Neil Ritchie, James Elliott, Harold Redman, Reginald Denning, Kenneth Crawford, Kenneth Strong, Temple Gurdon, Philip Balfour, Hugh Russell, John Edwards, Bernard Campbell Fletcher, John Winterton and Henry Vulliamy.) He later served in Cyprus, where he was appointed an Officer of the Order of the British Empire for suppressing a Greek Cypriot rebellion between 1931 and 1932.

== Second World War ==
At the outbreak of the Second World War in September 1939, Freeman-Attwood (having added Attwood to his name in 1937) by now a lieutenant colonel, was serving as a General Staff Officer (GSO) with the 50th (Northumbrian) Motor Division, a TA formation. He was sent with the division to France in January 1940 where it became part of the British Expeditionary Force (BEF). He served with the division throughout the Battle of France in May 1940 and took part in the Dunkirk evacuation, and, in late July, was promoted to brigadier and assumed command of the 5th London Brigade, another TA unit, part of the 2nd London Division (both redesignated in November 1940 as the 141st (London) Infantry Brigade and 47th (London) Infantry Division). In November 1941 he was promoted to major general and became General Officer Commanding (GOC) of the 46th Infantry Division, another TA unit, in succession to Major General Miles Dempsey.

The division, recruiting from the North Midlands and the West Riding of Yorkshire, was composed of the 137th, 138th and 139th Infantry Brigades and divisional troops. In January 1943, Freeman-Attwood led the division overseas to French North Africa, where, upon its arrival in Tunisia, came under command of V Corps, (Lieutenant General Charles Allfrey), First Army (Lieutenant General Kenneth Anderson). The division fought in the Tunisian campaign, most notably in the final stages of the Battle of Kasserine Pass and in Operation Ochsenkopf, until the campaign came to an end in May 1943, with Freeman-Attwood being awarded the Distinguished Service Order (DSO) for his division's actions at Djebel Abiod.

== Retirement and later years ==
In August, as the division was preparing to take part in the Allied invasion of Italy, Freeman-Attwood was relieved of his command and retired from the army in October, after being court-martialled for writing home in a letter to his wife expressing a wish to be drinking champagne in Italy on their wedding anniversary and disclosing details of future military operations. Returning to civilian life, he joined the Imperial Chemical Industries and, by 1949, was Staff Manager.

Freeman-Attwood divorced in 1945, and remarried to Marion Louise the following year, he retired to Nottinghamshire where he was involved in politics and active for the Conservative Party.

== Bibliography ==
- Smart, Nick (2005). Biographical Dictionary of British Generals of the Second World War. Barnsley, South Yorkshire: Pen and Sword Books. ISBN 1844150496.

Military offices
Preceded by Miles Dempsey	GOC 46th Infantry Division; 1941–1943	Succeeded by John Hawkesworth
