= Algernon Ransome =

British Army general

Major-General Algernon Ransome CB DSO* MC
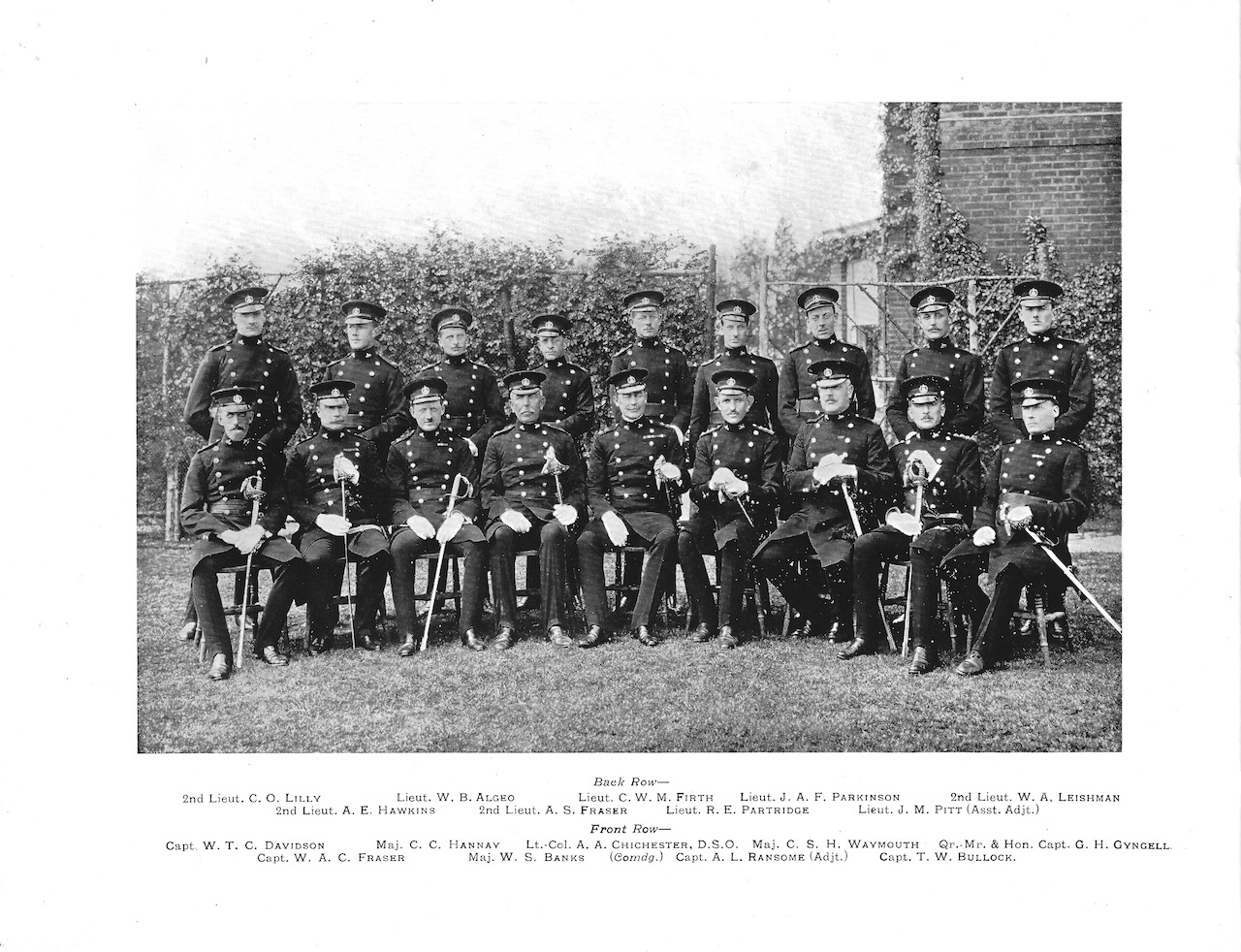
- Officers of the 1st Battalion, Dorset Regiment, May 1912; Ransome is sat fourth on the right in the front row
- Born: 29 August 1883; United States
- Died: 1969 (aged 85–86)
- Military career
- Allegiance: United Kingdom
- Branch: British Army
- Service years: 1903–1939
- Rank: Major-General
- Service number: 12623
- Unit: Dorsetshire Regiment
- Commands: 46th Infantry Division (1939); 2nd Indian Infantry Brigade (1934–1935); 170th (2/1st North Lancashire) Brigade (1918–1919); 7th (Service) Battalion, Buffs (East Kent Regiment) (1916–1918)
- Conflicts: First World War; Second World War
- Awards: Companion of the Order of the Bath; Distinguished Service Order & Bar; Military Cross; Mentioned in Despatches (6)

Major-General Algernon Lee Ransome, CB, DSO & Bar, MC (29 August 1883 – 1969) was a British Army officer.

== Military career ==
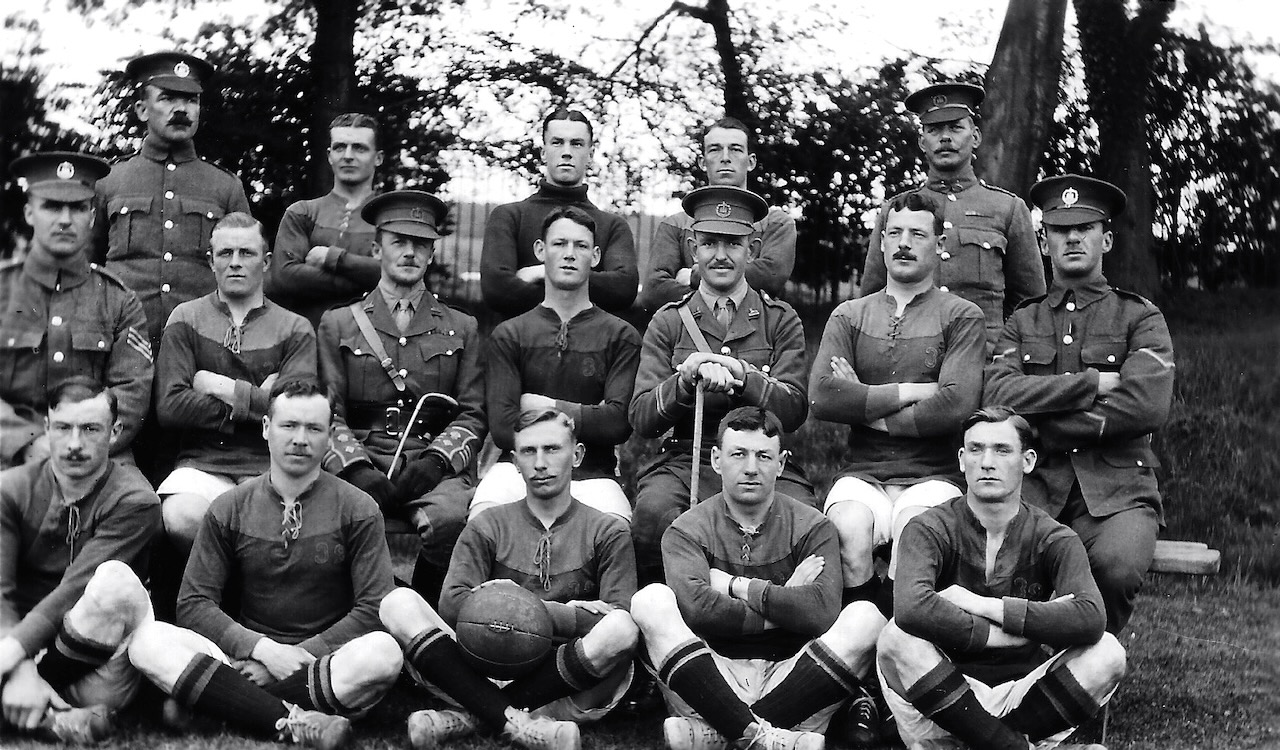
Group photo of the 1st Battalion, Dorset Regiment Football XI, with several officers. Belfast 1913/14. Middle row, third from left is Lieutenant Colonel Louis Bols; third from right, middle row is Captain Ransome, the battalion's adjutant.

Algernon Lee Ransome was born in the United States and was privately educated before going to the United Kingdom where, after attending and later graduating from the Royal Military College, Sandhurst, he was commissioned into the Dorsetshire Regiment on 19 December 1903. He spent the first few years of his military career serving his regiment's first battalion.

Ransome served with distinction during the First World War. He became commanding officer of the 7th (Service) Battalion, Buffs (Royal East Kent Regiment) in 1916 and commanded it during the German spring offensive in March 1918. He went on succeed Gerald Boyd in command of the 170th (2/1st North Lancashire) Brigade and was granted the temporary rank of brigadier general whilst employed in this role from 5 September 1918 until the Armistice of 11 November 1918, which ended the war. During the war he was awarded the Distinguished Service Order (DSO) with Bar and, in 1915, the Military Cross. He was also mentioned in despatches six times, and rose from the rank of captain to brigadier general.

As a Regular Army officer, Ransome remained in the army during the interwar period, attending the Staff College, Camberley in the first post-war course in 1919. He then served as a staff officer with Aldershot Command and then at the War Office from 1920 to 1925. After marrying in 1927 he served in Australia at the Royal Military College, Duntroon as an instructor from 1927 to 1928 before returning to England and Aldershot Command, this time as an Assistant Adjutant General, holding this post from 1931 until 1933.

After that, he became commander of the 2nd Indian Infantry Brigade in 1933. He was promoted to major general on 1 June 1935 and retired from the army in 1938.

He was recalled to service to become general officer commanding (GOC) of the newly raised 46th Infantry Division, a Territorial Army (TA) formation, in October 1939, a month after the beginning of the Second World War, before retiring again in December.

He later commanded the 10th (Romsey) Battalion of the Hampshire Home Guard from 1942 to 1944. Romsey was where he spent his final years.

== Bibliography ==
- Smart, Nick (2005). Biographical Dictionary of British Generals of the Second World War. Barnesley: Pen & Sword. ISBN 1844150496.

Military offices
New command	GOC 46th Infantry Division; October–December 1939	Succeeded by Henry Curtis
