= Herbert Lumsden =

British Army general

Lieutenant-General Herbert Lumsden CB DSO* MC
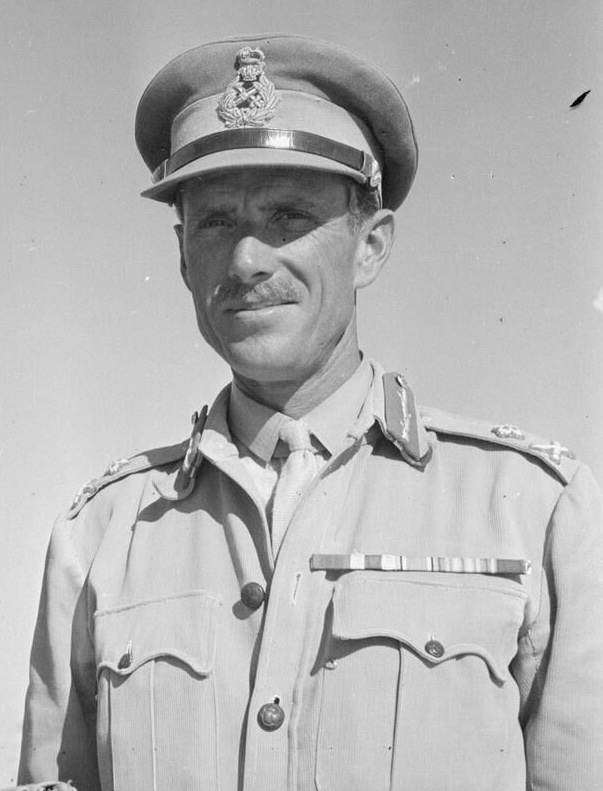
- Lumsden after his promotion to lieutenant-general, 6 September 1942
- Born: 8 April 1897; Santiago, Chile
- Died: 6 January 1945 (aged 47); Lingayen Gulf, Philippines
- Military career
- Allegiance: United Kingdom
- Branch: British Army
- Service years: 1916–1945
- Rank: Lieutenant-General
- Service number: 11523
- Units: Royal Horse Artillery; 12th Royal Lancers
- Commands: II Corps (1943); VIII Corps (1943); X Corps (1942); 1st Armoured Division (1941–1942); 6th Armoured Division (1941); 28th Armoured Brigade (1940–1941); 3rd Motor Machine Gun Brigade (1940); 12th Royal Lancers (1938–1940)
- Conflicts: First World War; Second World War: Battle of France; Battle of Dunkirk; North African campaign; Western Desert campaign; Second Battle of El Alamein; Battle of Miteiriya Ridge; Pacific War; Philippines campaign; Battle of Lingayen Gulf †
- Awards: Companion of the Order of the Bath; Distinguished Service Order & Bar; Military Cross; Mentioned in Despatches (2)

Lieutenant-General Herbert William Lumsden, CB, DSO & Bar, MC (8 April 1897 – 6 January 1945) was a senior British Army officer who fought in both the First and Second World Wars. He commanded the 1st Armoured Division in the Western Desert campaign, and later commanded X Corps at the Second Battle of El Alamein, before being relieved by his superior, Lieutenant General Bernard Montgomery. He was killed in action by the Japanese in early 1945, becoming the most senior combat casualty of the British Army of the Second World War.

== Early life ==
Herbert Lumsden was born in Santiago, Chile, on 8 April 1897, the son of John and Anna Lumsden, née Dimalow. He was sent to England and was educated at The Leys School.

== First World War ==
At the outbreak of the First World War, in August 1914, he was only 17 years old. He served in the ranks with the Territorial Force (TF) for ten months before passing into the Royal Military Academy, Woolwich, from where he was commissioned into the Royal Horse Artillery on 13 August 1916. On 26 July 1918 Lumsden was awarded the Military Cross. The citation read:

For conspicuous gallantry and devotion to duty during 13 days of continuous fighting in charge of a forward section. He invariably showed the greatest coolness and courage in the face of danger, keeping his section in action, and always volunteering for any officer's patrol work. As FOO he was consistently shelled whenever he moved his OP, and, although finally wounded, he continued to work and observe for his battery.

== Between wars ==
On 19 April 1923, Lumsden married Alice Mary Roddick in Northaw. They had two sons, Jack and Peter. Lumsden continued to serve in the Royal Artillery until 24 June 1925, when he transferred to the cavalry regiment 12th Royal Lancers. In August, he was promoted from lieutenant to captain after almost eight years in the former rank. He was an ardent horseman, despite his 6 ft height, and participated in a number of Grand Nationals. In 1926, he won the Grand Military Gold Cup at Sandown riding Foxtrot.

In 1929, Lumsden attended and passed the Staff College, Camberley course. Promoted to major in 1931, he held staff appointments in the cavalry for the next four years, being GSO3 of Aldershot Command and then brigade major of the 1st Cavalry Brigade. After a period of not being employed he became GSO2 at the Staff College, Camberley before being given command, in 1938, of his old regiment, the 12th Royal Lancers in succession to Colonel Richard McCreery. He was still in command of the regiment, now converted to armoured cars, at the outbreak of the Second World War.

== Second World War ==
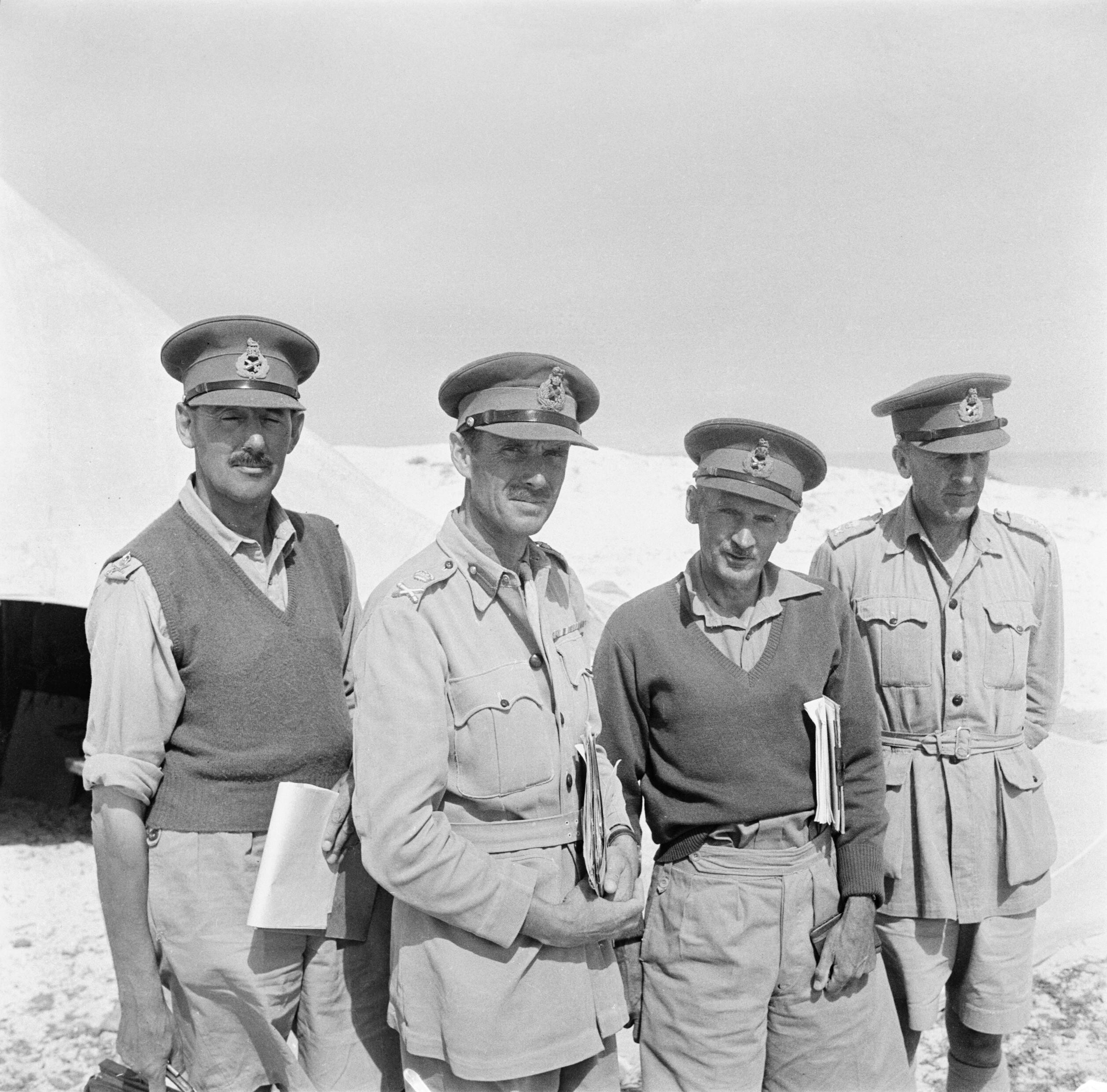
Lieutenant-General Bernard Montgomery with his three corps commanders in late 1942: Lieutenant-Generals Herbert Lumsden, Sir Oliver Leese and Brian Horrocks

Lumsden was widely praised for his command of his regiment during the retreat to Dunkirk in 1940 as part of the British Expeditionary Force (BEF). His regiment, the reconnaissance regiment of BEF General Headquarters (GHQ), was the first unit to cross the border from France into Belgium, occurring at roughly 13:00 on 10 May, the day of the German assault in the West. Amongst other actions he held off German attacks on Bernard Montgomery's 3rd Division's exposed left flank and was awarded the Distinguished Service Order (DSO). Montgomery felt upstaged by the lower ranked Lumsden, who had acted without orders and the relationship between the two men deteriorated from this point on.

After returning to the United Kingdom Lumsden was promoted and commanded a tank brigade before being appointed General Officer Commanding (GOC) of the 6th Armoured Division in Home Forces in October 1941, taking over from Major-General John Crocker.

His period in command was very brief, however, as on 5 November Lumsden was given command of the 1st Armoured Division, which was then just beginning to arrive in Egypt. It was in this role that he first saw service in the North African campaign. A forceful personality, he was wounded twice in 1942 (having to hand over his command to Frank Messervy from January to March), received a Bar to his DSO and on his return to service and the 1st Armoured Division, survived Lieutenant-General Bernard Montgomery's cull of Eighth Army commanders. Montgomery had been keen to sack Lumsden whom he still resented following the incident at Dunkirk but he was overruled by his Commander-in-Chief General Sir Harold Alexander.

Lumsden was appointed commander of X Corps for the Second Battle of El Alamein upon the recommendation of Lieutenant-General Brian Horrocks, who turned the command down in his favour.

=== The Miteiriya Ridge controversy ===
During the night of 24/25 October 1942, after the Second Battle of El Alamein had begun, the British assault of infantry and engineers over the Miteiriya Ridge during the Second Battle of El Alamein failed. Despite having agreed to Montgomery's battle plan, Lumsden believed it was impossible for his X Corps armour to fight its way into the open without incurring appalling casualties from uncleared minefields and anti-tank fire. He wanted to pull his tanks back and send them into battle once the assault of infantry and engineers had taken place as originally planned.

In the early hours of 25 October, Lumsden and Montgomery argued fiercely. The relationship between the two men was worse than ever, and Lumsden demanded that his armour should be pulled back whilst Montgomery insisted the attack continue. Lumsden asked one of his tank commanders, Major-General Alexander Gatehouse, commanding the 10th Armoured Division, to back him up. In a heated telephone conversation with Montgomery, Gatehouse said that he concurred with Lumsden and that to advance through uncharted and uncleared minefields, covered by strong batteries of anti-tank guns, with the noise from the tanks making surprise impossible, would be disastrous. Montgomery modified the scope of the attack from six armoured regiments to one: the Staffordshire Yeomanry. It lost all but fifteen of its tanks and the operation ended where it had begun, on the wrong side of the Miteiriya Ridge having failed to break through with the armour.

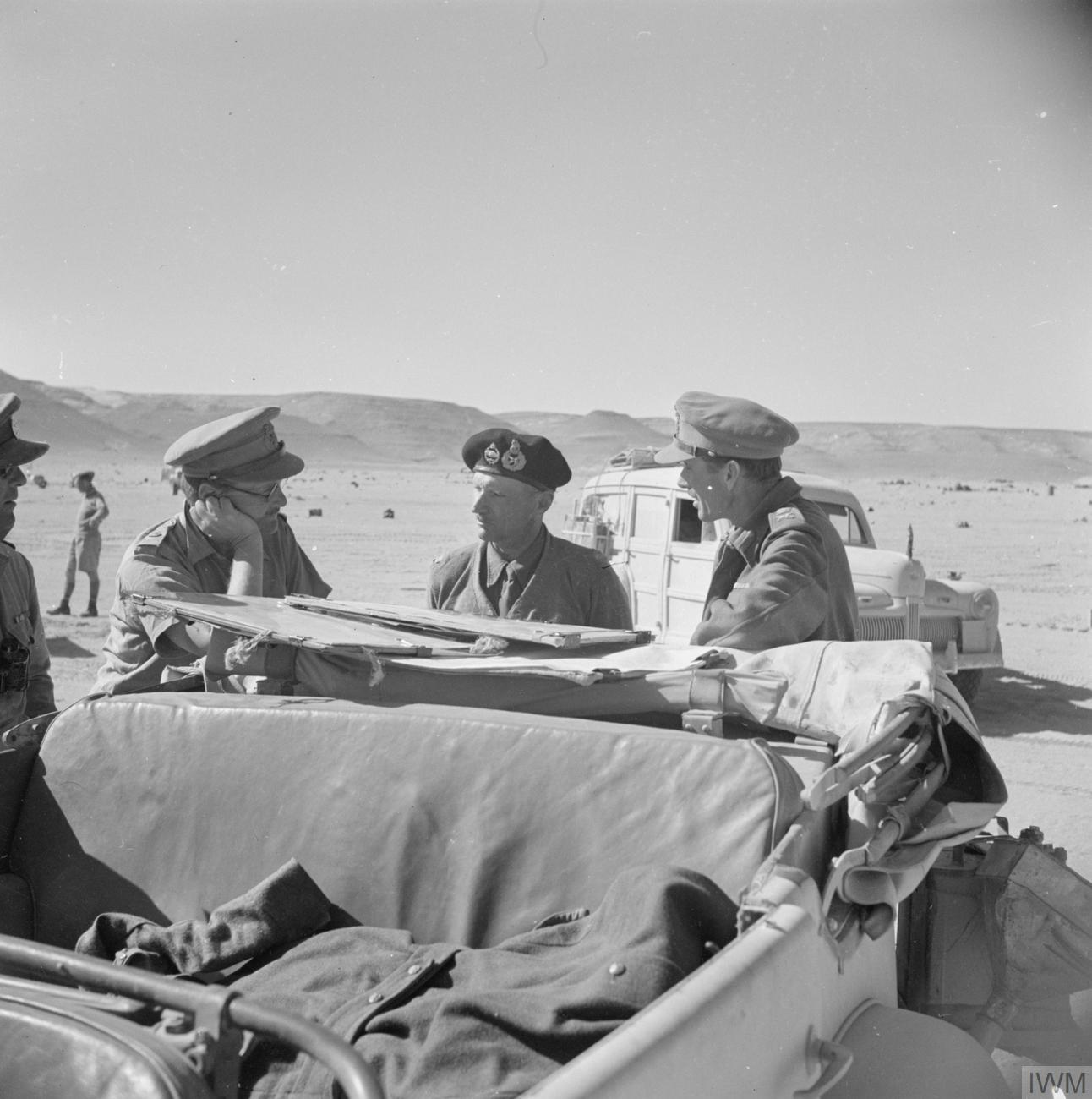
A conference between Lieutenant-General Bernard Montgomery, Lieutenant-General Sir Bernard Freyberg and Lieutenant-General Lumsden, near Halfaya Pass before the army commander passed into Cyrenacia, 24 November 1942.

The Allies were victorious at El Alamein but for Lumsden, his confrontation with Montgomery in the heat of battle proved ruinous. Lumsden was replaced by Horrocks, who had previously recommended Lumsden to Montgomery, while Gatehouse was also removed from command. On his return to London, on entering his club Lumsden was heard to comment, "I've just been sacked because there isn't room in the desert for two cads like Monty and me." After Lumsden's death in 1945 Montgomery, notoriously sensitive to criticism of his generalship, unjustly blamed the near failure of his attack on 24/25 October 1942 on Lumsden.

Lumsden was liked and respected by Winston Churchill. After his dismissal by Montgomery he was given command of VIII Corps in Britain in January 1943 and command of II Corps in July, before being sent to the Pacific as Winston Churchill's special military representative to United States Army General Douglas MacArthur.

=== Death in action ===
In January 1945 Lumsden was with the American naval forces transporting MacArthur's 6th Army to Lingayen Gulf, site of the upcoming landing on Luzon, the Philippines' most populous island. On 4 January 1945, Japanese kamikaze began a week-long assault on this force. On 6 January, a kamikaze hit the bridge of the battleship USS New Mexico and Lumsden was killed, becoming the most senior British Army combat casualty of the Second World War. Lumsden was the subject of obituaries in Time magazine and in The Times.

== Bibliography ==
- Blaxland, Gregory (1977). The Plain Cook and the Great Showman: The First and Eighth Armies in North Africa. Kimber. ISBN 0-7183-0185-4.
- Callahan, Raymond (2007). Churchill and His Generals. University Press of Kansas. ISBN 978-070061512-4.
- Jackson, G. S. (2006) [1945]. 8 Corps: Normandy to the Baltic. MLRS Books. ISBN 978-1-905696-25-3.
- Mead, Richard (2007). Churchill's Lions: a biographical guide to the key British generals of World War II. Stroud: Spellmount. ISBN 978-1-86227-431-0.
- Smart, Nick (2005). Biographical Dictionary of British Generals of the Second World War. Barnsley: Pen & Sword. ISBN 1844150496.

Military offices
Preceded by John Crocker	GOC 6th Armoured Division; October 1941	Succeeded by Charles Gairdner
Preceded by Willoughby Norrie	GOC 1st Armoured Division; 1941–1942	Succeeded by Frank Messervy
Preceded by Frank Messervy	GOC 1st Armoured Division; March–August 1942	Succeeded by Raymond Briggs
Preceded by William Holmes	GOC X Corps; August–December 1942	Succeeded by Brian Horrocks
Preceded by Edward Grasett	GOC VIII Corps; January–July 1943	Succeeded by Sir Richard McCreery
Preceded by Gerald Templer	GOC II Corps; July–October 1943	Succeeded by Sir Desmond Anderson
