= John Hawkesworth (British Army officer) =

British Army general

Lieutenant-General Sir John Hawkesworth KBE CB DSO*
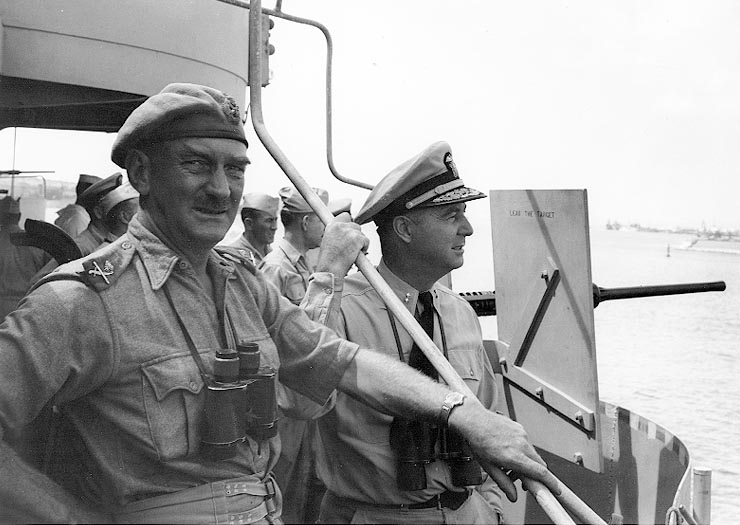
- Rear Admiral Richard L. Conolly of the U.S. Navy, pictured here on the right, alongside Major-General John Hawkesworth aboard USS Biscayne, 6 September 1943.
- Born: 19 February 1893; St Bees, Cumberland, England
- Died: 3 June 1945 (aged 52); Gibraltar
- Burial place: North Front Cemetery, Gibraltar
- Relatives: John Hawkesworth (son)
- Military career
- Allegiance: United Kingdom
- Branch: British Army
- Service years: 1914–1945
- Rank: Lieutenant-General
- Nickname: "Ginger"
- Service number: 22835
- Unit: East Yorkshire Regiment
- Commands: Military Command Athens (1944–1945); X Corps (1944); 46th Infantry Division (1943–1944); 4th Infantry Division (1942–1943); 12th Infantry Brigade (1939–1940); 2nd Battalion, East Yorkshire Regiment (1937–1939)
- Conflicts: First World War; Arab revolt in Palestine; Second World War
- Awards: Knight Commander of the Order of the British Empire; Companion of the Order of the Bath; Distinguished Service Order & Bar; Mentioned in Despatches (3); Croix de guerre (France); Croix de guerre (Belgium); Commander of the Legion of Merit (United States)

Lieutenant-General Sir John Ledlie Inglis Hawkesworth, KBE, CB, DSO & Bar (19 February 1893 – 3 June 1945) was a senior British Army officer who served during both World Wars. During the Second World War he commanded the 4th Division during the Tunisian Campaign in early 1943, later commanding the 46th Division throughout most of the Italian Campaign and, finally, X Corps in Greece, before suffering from a fatal heart attack in June 1945.

== Early life and First World War ==
Hawkesworth was born on 19 February 1893 and was educated at St Bees School, Cumberland from 1907 to 1912, where he excelled at rugby, playing in the School XV in 1911–1912. One of his teammates was G. A. West, later the Bishop of Rangoon. He then went up to The Queen's College, Oxford to read Modern History.

He joined the unattached list of the Territorial Reserve of the British Army on 23 January 1914, before being gazetted as a second lieutenant into the East Yorkshire Regiment on 15 August 1914, eleven days after Britain entered the First World War. He served on the Western Front during the war, mainly with the 1st Battalion of his regiment, part of the 18th Brigade of the 6th Division (later transferred to the 64th Brigade of the 21st Division), and was wounded three times, ending the war as a captain. On the first day of the Battle of the Somme, on 1 July 1916, he was one of few officers not to be killed or wounded as his battalion sustained 460 casualties. In 1921 was awarded the French Croix de guerre.

== Between the wars ==
He remained in the British Army during the interwar period, holding various junior regimental and staff postings until attending the Staff College, Camberley between 1927 and 1928.

He served as brigade major of the 15th Infantry Brigade from 1930 to 1932, before becoming deputy assistant adjutant-general on the staff of Northern Command until 1934. He was on the directing staff of the Staff College, Camberley as a general staff officer, Grade 3 (GSO3) from 1934 to 1937 and was promoted to lieutenant colonel, becoming a GSO1 in 1937. On promotion he commanded the 2nd Battalion, East Yorkshire Regiment and was mentioned in despatches for service in Palestine during the Arab revolt.

== Second World War ==
In October 1939, a month after the outbreak of the Second World War, Hawkesworth was given command of the 12th Infantry Brigade, taking over from Brigadier George Clark. The brigade was one of three which formed part of the 4th Infantry Division, under Major-General Dudley Johnson, and was then serving with the British Expeditionary Force (BEF) in France. However, unlike in the First World War, there was no immediate action and, in late 1939, the brigade moved to the Maginot Line near Metz, where it gained experience engaging the enemy in patrolling actions. He commanded the brigade throughout the Battle of France, finally being forced to retreat to Dunkirk where his brigade was evacuated to England at the end of May 1940, leaving France himself on 1 June.

Hawkesworth handed over command of the 12th Brigade on 18 June to Brigadier Daniel Beak, who had commanded a battalion in the brigade, and, in August, he was made a Commander of the Order of the British Empire (CBE) and was also mentioned in despatches for his service in France and Belgium. On 9 December 1940 Hawkesworth was promoted to the acting rank of major-general and was appointed Director of Military Training (DMT) at the War Office. In this role he was responsible for general military training for other ranks at a time when the British Army was undergoing a rapid expansion. His rank of major-general was made temporary on 9 December 1941, and, on 25 December 1941, his rank was made permanent.

In March 1942 Hawkesworth handed over to Major-General John Whitaker and returned to the 4th Infantry Division and was appointed as its General Officer Commanding (GOC), succeeding Major-General John Swayne. Shortly after he assumed command a tank brigade (the 21st) was substituted for one of the three infantry brigades (the 11th) to create a "mixed" division and training began for overseas service. In the New Years honours list of 1943 Hawkesworth was appointed Companion of the Order of the Bath (CB).

Hawkesworth landed with his division in Algeria in French North Africa in late March 1943, and soon moved to Tunisia, where it came under the command of Lieutenant-General Charles Allfrey's V Corps, part of Lieutenant-General Kenneth Anderson's British First Army. The division, transferring to Lieutenant-General Brian Horrocks's IX Corps, took part in the final stages of the Tunisian campaign until the fighting ended on 13 May, with the surrender of nearly 250,000 Axis soldiers who subsequently became prisoners of war (POWs), although heavy casualties were sustained by Hawkesworth's division. For his services in Tunisia Hawkesworth was awarded the Distinguished Service Order (DSO).

The 4th Division, after suffering heavy losses in Tunisia, was rested for the Sicilian campaign but in late August Hawkesworth was ordered to hand over his division to Major-General Hayman Hayman-Joyce, and received new orders to take over as GOC of the 46th Infantry Division, a Territorial Army (TA) formation that had seen service in Tunisia alongside his 4th Division, after the division's former GOC, Major-General Harold Freeman-Attwood, was relieved of his command and arrested for a security violation.

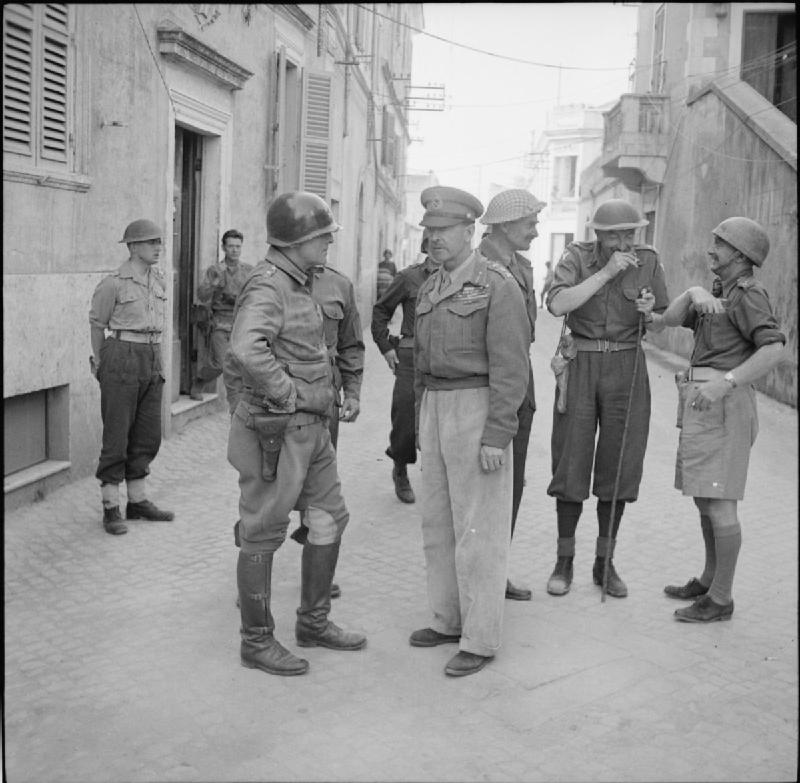
General Sir Harold Alexander with Major General Lucian Truscott and other senior Allied commanders at Anzio, Italy, 5 May 1944. Hawkesworth is pictured on the far right wearing a Parachutist Helmet, and to the left of him is Major-General Philip Gregson-Ellis.

The 46th Division took part in the Allied invasion of Italy on 9 September as part of the British X Corps, under Lieutenant-General Sir Richard McCreery, then serving under Lieutenant General Mark W. Clark's US Fifth Army and, repelling numerous fierce counterattacks, suffered very heavy casualties (including Hawkesworth's senior brigade commander, Brigadier Manley James of the 128th (Hampshire) Brigade). After the capture of Naples in early October the division crossed the Volturno Line, with X Corps forming the left flank of the Fifth Army's advance to the Winter Line (also known as the Gustav Line). During the First Battle of Monte Cassino in January 1944 the division made an assault crossing of the Garigliano river. Lack of assault boats and heavy German resistance condemned it to failure, with heavy losses, mainly to the 128th (Hampshire) Brigade. The 46th Division's failure was to have serious repercussions for the US 36th (Texas) Division, to the right of the 46th, when it attempted to cross the Rapido River a few days later. After holding the line for the next few weeks, in March the division was relieved by Hawkesworth's old command, the 4th Division, and withdrawn to Egypt and Palestine to rest and refit, having sustained more than 5,000 casualties since landing at Salerno some six months prior.

In early May 1944, Hawkesworth spent a month in temporary command of the British 1st Infantry Division in the Anzio beachhead when its GOC, Major General Ronald Penney, fell ill. Hawkesworth returned to the 46th Division in early June. By July the 46th was back in Italy, now up to strength (largely from anti-aircraft gunners who had been retrained as infantrymen), as part of Lieutenant-General Sir Oliver Leese's British Eighth Army's V Corps, under Lieutenant-General Charles Keightley, on the Adriatic coast. The division was involved in heavy fighting during Operation Olive, the Eighth Army's major assault on the Gothic Line defences in September and October.

On 6 November 1944 Hawkesworth was promoted to the acting rank of lieutenant-general and became GOC of X Corps in place of McCreery, who was moved up to take command of the Eighth Army. After the Axis forces withdrew from Greece in October, British troops under Lieutenant-General Ronald Scobie were sent there to maintain internal stability. In late 1944, Hawkesworth and his X Corps HQ were sent to help calm the "December events" that preluded the Greek Civil War and to assume control of military operations so that Scobie could concentrate more on the highly complex and sensitive political aspects of the British involvement.

By March 1945 Hawkesworth and his HQ had returned to Italy. X Corps was in a reserve role and not involved in the final offensive in April 1945, which led to the surrender of Axis forces in Italy in early May and the end of the war in Europe. By this time, however, it had become apparent that Hawkesworth was suffering from a serious heart condition. He died on the way home to Britain, when he suffered a heart attack while on board his troopship which lay at Gibraltar, on 3 June 1945 at the age of fifty-two. He was appointed a Knight Commander of the Order of the British Empire on 2 June 1945.

For his services in Italy he was awarded a bar to his DSO and the United States Legion of Merit, Degree of Commander. He had also been mentioned in despatches in August 1944 for his services in the Italian theatre.

== End note ==
He left his wife, Helen Jane, and an only son, also named John, who at the time was also serving with the 4th Battalion, Grenadier Guards in the North-West Europe Campaign. On 10 August, General Mark W. Clark, commander of the Allied 15th Army Group, sent a tribute from his headquarters in Vienna mourning the "loss of a most highly-valued friendship to his many comrades-in-arms in the Mediterranean theatre…We shall not forget General Hawkesworth, and England has our eternal gratitude for producing men of his staunch integrity and character." The post-war British Army had been deprived of a popular and able commander.

== Bibliography ==
- Blaxland, Gregory (1977). The Plain Cook and the Great Showman: The First and Eighth Armies in North Africa. Kimber. ISBN 0-7183-0185-4.
- Blaxland, Gregory (1979). Alexander's Generals (the Italian Campaign 1944–1945). London: William Kimber & Co. ISBN 0-7183-0386-5.
- Mead, Richard (2007). Churchill's Lions: A Biographical Guide to the Key British Generals of World War II. Stroud, Gloucestershire: Spellmount. ISBN 978-1-86227-431-0.
- Smart, Nick (2005). Biographical Dictionary of British Generals of the Second World War. Barnsley, South Yorkshire: Pen and Sword Books. ISBN 1844150496.

Military offices
Preceded by John Swayne	GOC 4th Infantry Division; 1942–1943	Succeeded by Hayman Hayman-Joyce
Preceded by Harold Freeman-Attwood	GOC 46th Infantry Division; 1943–1944	Succeeded by Stephen Weir
Preceded by Sir Richard McCreery	GOC X Corps; 1944–1945	Succeeded by Post disbanded
