= Operations Vulcan and Strike =

Operations Vulcan and Strike refers to:

- Operation Vulcan (22 April – 1 May 1943)
- Operation Strike (6–13 May 1943)
