= X Corps (United Kingdom) =

Military unit

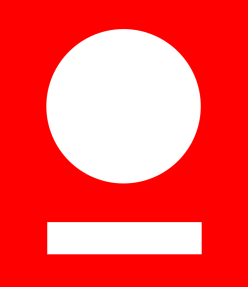
- Formation sign of X Corps during the Second World War (second pattern).
- Active: 1915–1919; 1940–1945
- Country: United Kingdom
- Branch: British Army
- Type: Corps
- Engagements: World War I; Battle of the Somme; Battle of Messines; Third Battle of Ypres; Fifth Battle of Ypres; World War II; North African campaign; Second Battle of El Alamein; Allied invasion of Italy; Operation Avalanche

Commanders
- Notable commanders: Thomas Morland; William Peyton; Reginald Stephens; William Holmes; Herbert Lumsden; Brian Horrocks; Richard McCreery

Insignia
- Corps formation sign during the early part of the Second World War (first pattern).

- Corps formation sign during the First World War (an unaltered corps flag).

X Corps was a corps of the British Army that served in the First World War on the Western Front before being disbanded in 1919. The corps was re-formed in 1942 during the Second World War and saw service in the North African Campaign and the Italian Campaign where it came under command of the US Fifth Army and the British Eighth Army.

== First World War ==
X Corps was formed in France in July 1915 under Thomas Morland. In the autumn of 1916, the corps took part in the Battle of the Somme where its 36th (Ulster) Division captured Schwaben Redoubt and held it for a short time. In 1917, X Corps, formed a part of the Second Army and included the 29th and 30th Divisions followed by others, as the Second Army was reinforced for the Flanders operations after the Battle of Arras. In June 1917 it took part in the Battle of Messines. The corps then participated in the Third Battle of Ypres. In May and June 1918, it was commanded by William Peyton. Later in 1918 it came under the command of Reginald Stephens.

=== Order of battle on 11 November 1918 ===
At the armistice, the division was on the Second Army's right.

- 30th Division (Major-General Williams)
- 29th Division (Major-General Cayley)
- Corps Troops
  - V/X Heavy Trench Mortar Battery
  - 10th Cyclist Battalion
  - X Corps Signal Company

== Second World War ==
=== Home Defence ===
X Corps was reformed in June 1940 as part of Home Forces in the United Kingdom, commanded by Major-General William Holmes, formerly the commander of the 42nd (East Lancashire) Infantry Division, and aided by Francis Davidson as his Brigadier General Staff (BGS). It was based as Scotch Corner near Darlington within Northern Command.

Order of Battle Autumn 1940

- 54th (East Anglian) Infantry Division
- 59th (Staffordshire) Infantry Division
- Royal Artillery
  - 121st (West Riding) Army Field Regiment
  - 1st Medium Regiment

=== North Africa ===
X Corps first went on active service in Syria under the command of Major-General William Holmes. In the summer of 1942, Lieutenant-General Bernard Montgomery, the new British Eighth Army commander, decided it should join the Eighth Army in Egypt to become a mobile corps to exploit infantry breakthroughs in North Africa. It then comprised two armoured divisions (1st and 10th) with parts of the 8th Armoured Division divided between them, and the 2nd New Zealand Division. Holmes was replaced by Lieutenant General Herbert Lumsden, who was not Montgomery's preferred choice and was sacked because of a perceived reluctance to pursue the retreating Afrika Korps and replaced by Lieutenant-General Brian Horrocks.

X Corps fought the Second Battle of El Alamein. The original plan was to be simultaneous attacks by XXX Corps and XIII Corps, to clear corridors for the X Corps armour to exploit. Events affected the plan and on 5 October, it was decided to attack simultaneously with XXX and X Corps. The New Zealanders rapidly captured Miteirya Ridge and XIII Corps pressed forward, X Corps was to strike north-westwards to distract and defeat Generalfeldmarschall Erwin Rommel and the Italo-German army. By 4 November, X Corps was in pursuit but heavy rain bogged the armour down and Rommel escaped. The corps was active through the remainder of the Tunisian Campaign with the Eighth Army until the Axis forces surrender in Tunisia in May 1943.

=== Italy and Greece ===
The Corps was not involved in the Sicily campaign but became part of Lieutenant General Mark W. Clark's US Fifth Army to take part in the landings at Salerno, Italy on 9 September 1943, where it had under command the 46th Infantry Division, 56th (London) Infantry Division and later 7th Armoured Division. Here it was commanded by Lieutenant-General Richard McCreery. After Salerno it continued to fight on the Fifth Army's left wing, breaching the Volturno Line and including taking part in the first Battle of Monte Cassino in January 1944.

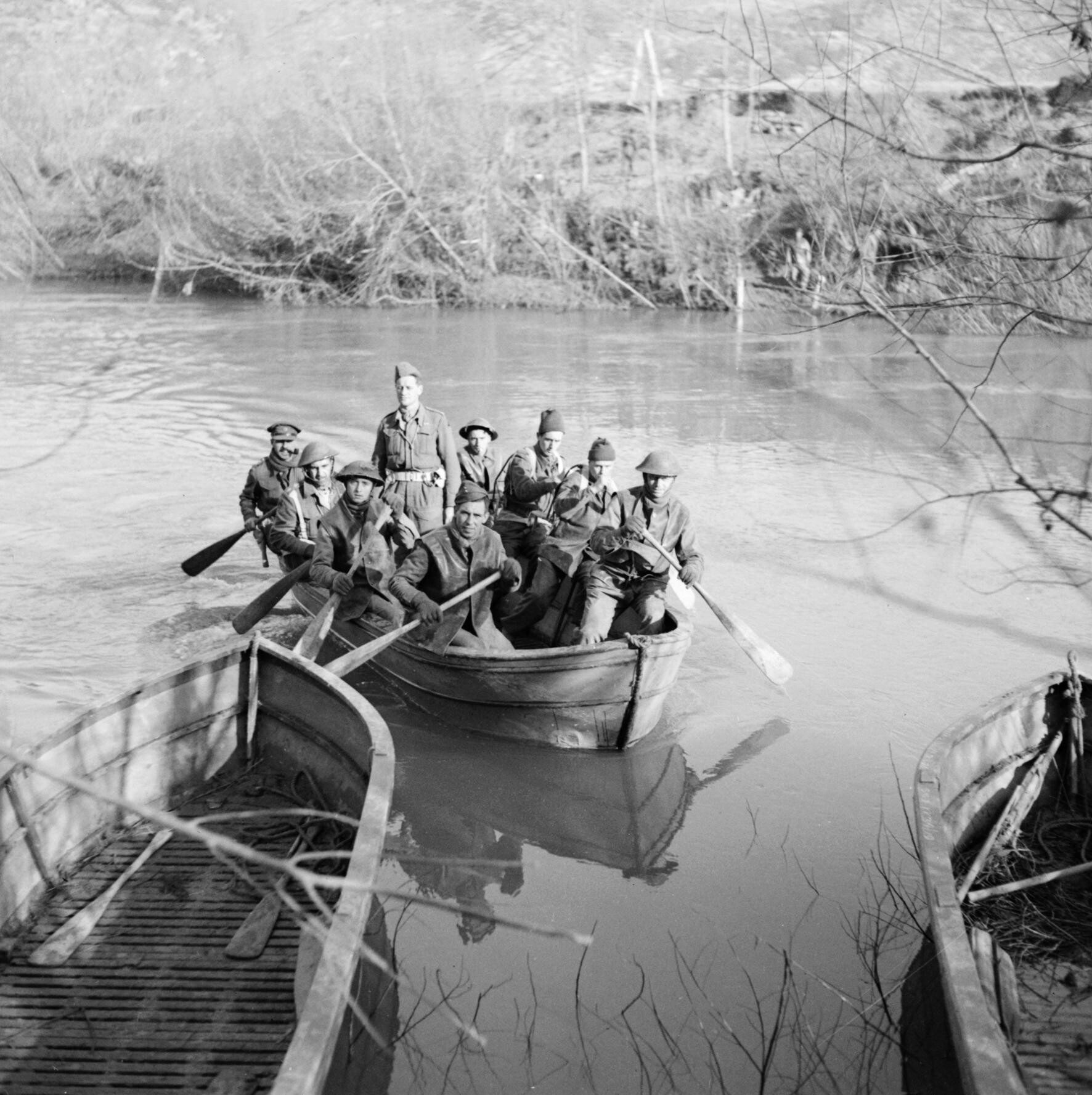
British infantry crossing the River Garigliano in assault boats, Italy, 18 January 1944.

In the spring of 1944, the corps was relieved by the French Expeditionary Corps (CEF) and switched back to the Eighth Army, taking position on the right of XIII Corps. The corps had a minor role in the Fourth Battle of Cassino but was involved in the Allied advance north through the summer, to the German Gothic Line defences. In September 1944 the corps played a holding role on the left flank of Eighth Army during Operation Olive, the autumn offensive on the Gothic Line.

In November 1944 command of X Corps was taken by Lieutenant-General John Hawkesworth, when McCreery was promoted to command Eighth Army, in place of Oliver Leese. From October 1944, after the Axis forces withdrew from Greece, British troops under Lieutenant-General Ronald Scobie were sent there to maintain internal stability. In late 1944 Hawkesworth and X Corps HQ were sent to Greece to assume control of military operations so that Scobie could concentrate on the political aspects of the British involvement.

By March 1945 Hawkesworth and his HQ had returned to Italy. X Corps was in reserve and not involved in the Allied Spring 1945 offensive in Italy in April, culminating in the surrender of Axis forces in Italy in early May. By this time it had become apparent that Hawkesworth was suffering from a serious heart condition. He died on the way home to Britain, when he suffered a heart attack while on board his troopship which lay at Gibraltar, on 3 June 1945.

== General Officers Commanding ==
Commanders have included:

- Jul 1915 – Apr 1918 Lieutenant-General Sir Thomas Morland
- Apr – May 1918 Lieutenant-General Sir Walter Congreve (temporary)
- May 1918 – Jul 1918 Lieutenant-General Sir William Peyton
- Jul 1918 – 1919 Lieutenant-General Reginald Stephens
- Jun 1940 – Aug 1942 Lieutenant-General William Holmes
- Aug 1942 – Dec 1942 Lieutenant-General Herbert Lumsden
- Dec 1942 – Apr 1943 Lieutenant-General Brian Horrocks
- Apr 1943 – May 1943 Lieutenant-General Bernard Freyberg
- Aug 1943 – Oct 1944 Lieutenant-General Sir Richard McCreery
- Nov 1944 – May 1945 Lieutenant-General Sir John Hawkesworth

== Sources ==
- Cole, Howard (1973). Formation Badges of World War 2. Britain, Commonwealth and Empire. London: Arms and Armour Press.
- Jones, Simon (2010). Underground Warfare 1914–1918. Pen & Sword Military. ISBN 978-1-84415-962-8.
- Keegan, John (1991). Churchill's Generals. London: Cassell. pp. 153–155. ISBN 0-304-36712-5.
- JPS Cigarette card series, Army, Corps and Divisional Signs 1914–1918, John Player and sons, 1920s.
- Mead, Richard (2007). Churchill's Lions: A Biographical Guide to the Key British Generals of World War II. Stroud: Spellmount. ISBN 978-1-86227-431-0.
- Newbold, David John (1988). "British planning and preparations to resist invasion on land, September 1939 – September 1940" (pdf). London: King's College, University of London. OCLC 556820697. uk.bl.ethos.241932. Archived from the original on 14 March 2021.
