= Bedwell =

Bedwell may refer to:

== People ==
- Frederick Bedwell (1796–1853), Lieutenant Commander in the Royal Navy
- H. Guy Bedwell, horse trainer
- Simon Bedwell (b. 1963), English artist
- Stephanie Bedwell-Grime, Canadian author
- Thomas Bedwell, Storekeeper of the Ordnance 1589-1595
- William Bedwell (1561–1632), English priest and scholar

== Fictional characters ==
- Matthew Bedwell, a character in Philip Pullman's novel The Ruby in the Smoke
- Nicholas Bedwell, a character in Philip Pullman's novel The Ruby in the Smoke

== Places ==
Australia

- Bedwell Island, Western Australia

Canada

- Bedwell Bay, British Columbia
- Bedwell Harbour, British Columbia
  - Bedwell Harbour Water Aerodrome
- The Bedwell island group, Northumberland Islands, named after Edward Parker Bedwell
- Bedwell Sound, named after Edward Parker Bedwell, north of Meares Island, near Tofino, British Columbia
  - Bedwell River, originally named Oinimitis, and also known as the Bear River, named in association with Bedwell S

United Kingdom

- Bedwell, Hertfordshire
- Bedwell, Wrexham, a hamlet in Sesswick community

United States

- Bedwell Springs, Tennessee
- Marion T. Bedwell School, Bernardsville, New Jersey

== See also ==
- Bidwell (disambiguation)
- Bidwill (disambiguation)
