= Bidwell =

Bidwell may refer to:

== People ==
- Bidwell (surname)

== Places ==
- Bidwell, Bedfordshire
- Bidwell, Missouri
- Bidwell, Ohio
- Bidwell, Ontario
- Bidwell Bar Bridge, two suspension bridges in Oroville, California
- Bidwell Mansion State Historic Park, Chico, California
- Bidwell Park, municipal park in Chico, California
- Bidwell-Sacramento River State Park, Butte County, California
- Bidwell's Bar, California, gold-mining camp
- Fort Bidwell, California

== Companies ==
- The Bidwell Bean Thresher Company, a manufacturer of bean threshing machines

== See also ==
- Bidhawal, an Australian Aboriginal tribe
- Bidwill (disambiguation)
- Bedwell (disambiguation)
