= Brian Horrocks =

British Army general (1895–1985)

Lieutenant-General Sir Brian Horrocks KCB KBE DSO MC
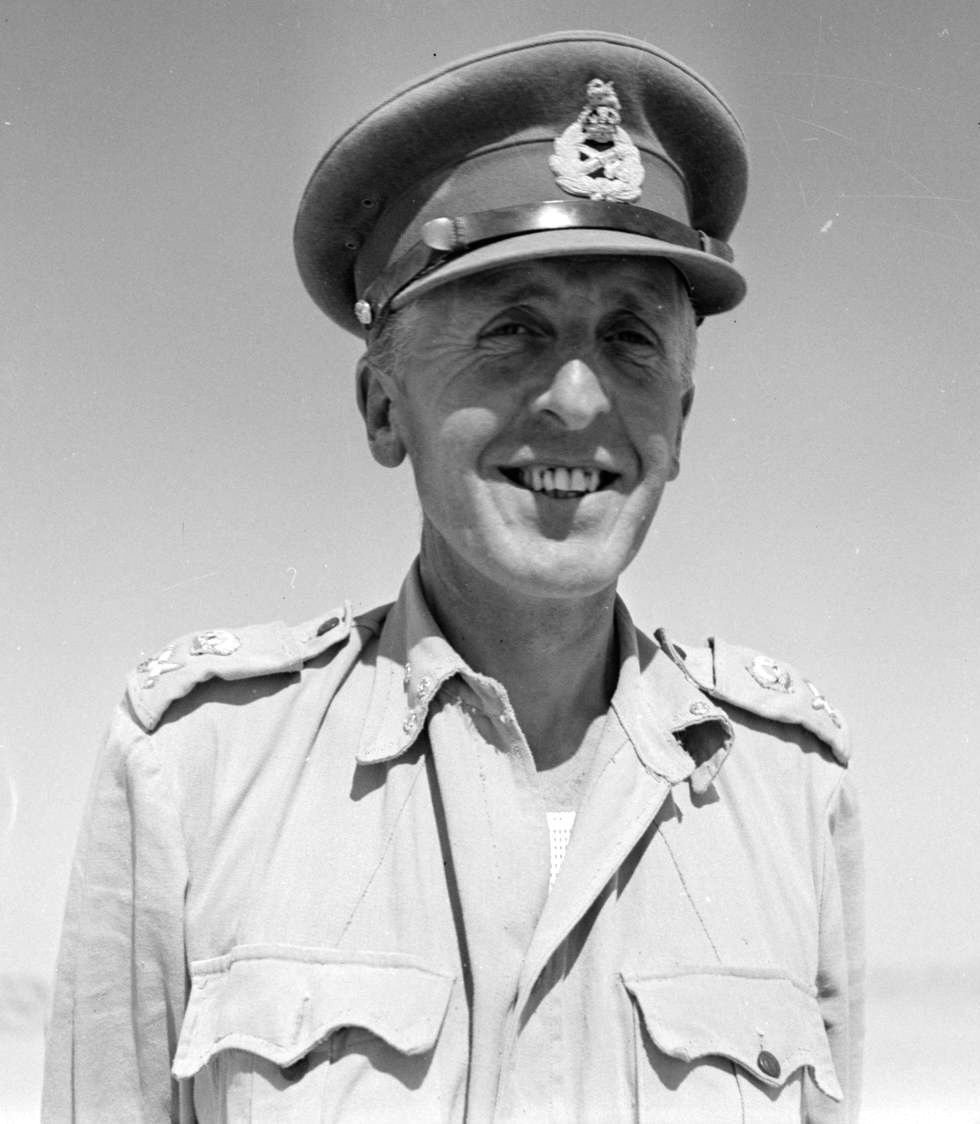
- Horrocks while commanding XIII Corps in North Africa, 1942
- Born: 7 September 1895; Ranikhet, India
- Died: 4 January 1985 (aged 89); Fishbourne, West Sussex, England
- Military career
- Allegiance: United Kingdom
- Branch: British Army
- Service years: 1913–1949
- Rank: Lieutenant-General
- Nickname: "Jorrocks" (Note: The nickname is a reference to R. S. Surtees' comic equestrian character.)
- Service number: 5821
- Unit: Middlesex Regiment
- Commands: British Army of the Rhine (1948); Western Command (1946–1948); XXX Corps (1944–1945); IX Corps (1943); X Corps (1942–1943); XIII Corps (1942); 9th Armoured Division (1942); 44th (Home Counties) Infantry Division (1941–1942); 9th Infantry Brigade (1940–1941); 2nd Battalion, Middlesex Regiment (1940)
- Conflicts: First World War; Russian Civil War; Anglo Irish War; Second World War
- Awards: Knight Commander of the Order of the Bath; Knight Commander of the Order of the British Empire; Distinguished Service Order; Military Cross; Mentioned in Despatches (3); Commander of the Order of George I (Greece); Knight Grand Officer of the Order of Orange-Nassau (Netherlands); Grand Officer of the Order of the Crown with Palm (Belgium); Croix de Guerre (Belgium); Commandeur of the Legion of Honour (France); Croix de Guerre (France); Commander of the Legion of Merit (United States)
- Other work: Black Rod; Television presenter Author

Lieutenant-General Sir Brian Gwynne Horrocks, KCB, KBE, DSO, MC (7 September 1895 – 4 January 1985) was a British Army officer, chiefly remembered as the commander of XXX Corps in Operation Market Garden and other operations during the Second World War. He also served in the First World War and the Russian Civil War, was taken prisoner twice, and competed in the modern pentathlon at the 1924 Paris Olympics. Later he was a television presenter, wrote books on military history, and was Black Rod in the House of Lords for 14 years.

In 1940 Horrocks commanded a battalion during the Battle of France, the first time he served under Bernard Montgomery, the most prominent British commander of the war. Montgomery later identified Horrocks as one of his most able officers, appointing him to corps commands in both North Africa and Europe. In 1943, Horrocks was seriously wounded and took more than a year to recover before returning to command a corps in Europe. It is likely that this period out of action meant he missed out on promotion; his contemporary corps commanders in North Africa, Oliver Leese and Miles Dempsey, went on to command at army level and above. Horrocks' wound continued to impair his health and led to his early retirement from the army after the war.

Since 1945, Horrocks has been regarded by some as one of the most successful British generals of the war, "a man who really led, a general who talked to everyone, down to the simplest private soldier" and the "beau ideal of a corps commander".

General Dwight D. Eisenhower, the Supreme Allied Commander in Western Europe, called him "the outstanding British general under Montgomery".

== Early life ==
Brian Gwynne Horrocks was the only son of Colonel Sir William Horrocks, a Lancashire born doctor in the Royal Army Medical Corps (RAMC), and his wife, Minna Horrocks, "who had all the gaiety and charm of the Irish". Born in Ranikhet in British India on 7 September 1895, young Brian—after having had "particularly happy memories of the four years spent at Gibraltar when my father was working on the causes of Malta fever"—returned to Britain, where he was educated at Bow School, Durham, then later Uppingham School, Rutland, an English public school, "where I gravitated automatically into the army class. There was never any question of my entering a profession other than the army." Of his childhood, he claimed to have had "an extremely happy childhood". Horrocks later wrote that, as his life was devoted almost entirely to sport, he had very little aptitude for hard work.

He entered the Royal Military College, Sandhurst, in October 1912, "bottom but one". Horrocks's time at Sandhurst was, by his own admission, not very distinguished. "Let me be quite honest about it; I was idle, careless about my turnout—in army parlance, scruffy—and, due to the fact that I am inclined to roll when I walk, very unsmart on parade". His score was sixth-lowest of the 167 successful applicants for cadetships—even after the addition of 200 bonus points for an Officer Training Corps (OTC) certificate, which not all the other candidates had. An unpromising student, he might not have received a commission at all but for the outbreak of the First World War in August 1914.

== First World War ==
Horrocks was commissioned as a second lieutenant into the Middlesex Regiment, a line infantry regiment of the British Army, on 8 August 1914. Horrocks, in charge of a ninety-five-man draft of replacements, joined the 1st Battalion of his regiment as part of the British Expeditionary Force (BEF) during the BEF's retreat following its baptism of fire at the Battle of Mons. By the time he and his men had got to Southampton his ninety-five-man draft had increased to ninety-eight, with three others, in their keenness to get into the war, having sneaked in. He described the feeling at the time:

This was, I should think, the last time there was any romance attached to war. It is impossible now after the bitter experience of two world wars to recapture the spirit of this country in August, 1914. As I marched through those cheering crowds I felt like a king among men. It was all going to be over by Christmas and our one anxiety was whether we would get over there in time. And all ranks felt the same.

Arriving in France, Horrocks was assigned to No. 16 Platoon of the 1st Battalion of the Middlesex Regiment, with Captain Edward Stephen Gibbons (who was killed in 1918) as his company commander. The battalion was part of the 19th Independent Brigade, which was not assigned to a division. Horrocks wrote that his "chief memory of those days, and the memory retained by all platoon commanders, was of marching—endless and exhausting marches. I had never realised before that it was possible to go to sleep while the legs continued automatically to function." He found comfort in "that priceless Cockney sense of humour. A small private soldier in the rank in front of me looked up at his neighbour, who was blessed with a long lugubrious face, and said, Why don't you give your face a holiday, chum? Try a smile." He also came to greatly admire Captain Gibbons, along with his platoon sergeant, Sergeant Whinney. Once, while it was pouring with rain, the officers of the battalion were offered billets in a comfortable farmhouse, while the other ranks slept in a field covered with manure which had recently been departed by some cows; Captain Gibbons was furious, insisting that the officers should share in the misery of their subordinates. "My heart sank but I knew instinctively that he was right", Horrocks later wrote. Douglas Delaney writes that the "willingness of soldiers to follow was constructed on gestures like this. It is interesting how some events, though seemingly insignificant in the bigger scheme of things, become embedded in memory, making lifelong memories of themselves." Horrocks was not to last much longer in battle, as on 21 October, at the Battle of Armentières, his platoon was surrounded, and Horrocks, while defending the town of Maisnil against a German attack, received a bullet wound through the lower abdomen and upper thigh, and was taken prisoner. "The war for me was over and my active military career had stopped for four years."

Incarcerated in a military hospital, he was repeatedly interrogated by his German captors, who believed that the British were using expanding bullets in contravention of the 1899 Hague Convention. Horrocks' captors refused to change his clothes or sheets, and denied him and a fellow officer basic amenities. Both had temporarily lost the use of their legs, and were forced to crawl to the toilet, which caused Horrocks' wounds to become infected. Conditions improved after his discharge and transfer to a prisoner of war camp. On his way to the camp, Horrocks befriended his German escort—he attributed their rapport to the mutual respect that front line troops share. He was promoted to lieutenant on 18 December 1914, despite being in enemy hands, and often tried to escape, once coming within 500 yards (460 m) of the Dutch border before being recaptured. He was eventually placed in a compound for Russian officers, in the hope that the language barrier would hinder his escape attempts; Horrocks used the time to learn the Russian language. Years later, working in the House of Commons, he startled Nikita Khrushchev and Nikolai Bulganin by greeting them in their native tongue. In the latter part of the war he was held in Holzminden prisoner-of-war camp. His resistance in captivity would earn him the Military Cross (MC), awarded in 1920 and backdated to 5 May 1919.

Repatriated at the end of the war, Horrocks had difficulty adapting to a peacetime routine. He went on sprees in London, spending four years of accumulated back-pay in six weeks.

== Between the wars ==
=== Russia ===
In 1919 Horrocks was posted to Russia as part of the Allied intervention in the Russian Civil War. After landing at Vladivostok on 19 April, he was briefed at British headquarters. The White Army under Admiral Kolchak, with the help of released Czechoslovak Legion prisoners, had driven the Red Army out of Siberia. Kolchak's Czech troops were returning home, and the British military contingent was urgently trying to replace them with Russians. To accomplish this, the British had only two infantry battalions and two small administrative missions, one charged with training and arming the Russians with British war-surplus equipment, and the other with improving the White Army's communications.

Horrocks' first task, along with a party of 13 British officers and 30 other ranks, was to guard a train delivering 27 carriages of shells to the White Army in Omsk, 3,000 miles (4,800 km) away on the Trans-Siberian Railway. The journey took more than a month, and as the only party member fluent in Russian, Horrocks had to deal with many of the difficulties encountered. At every station, he had to ward off station masters intent on acquiring the carriages. While stopped in Manzhouli, the British officers' presence provoked a duel between two Cossack officers. Horrocks accepted an invitation to act as a second, but the pair were arrested before the duel could take place. He managed to defuse the situation before it came to trial, by claiming his faulty Russian had been the cause of the misunderstanding.

His next assignment was in Yekaterinburg in the Urals, where he was appointed second in command of a training school for non-commissioned officers attached to the Anglo-Russian Brigade. He found this post frustrating, having to dismiss nearly a third of his initial cadre on medical grounds, and struggling to get supplies and support from the White Army authorities. Despite this, he developed a rapport with his men and an admiration for the Russian soldier.

Although British forces were ordered home shortly afterwards, Horrocks and another officer, George Hayes, remained to advise the First Siberian Army. The White Army was in retreat, and Horrocks joined them as they fell back to Vladivostok, 3,000 miles (4,800 km) away. He was captured by the Red Army on 7 January 1920, in the town of Krasnoyarsk, and spent 10 months as a prisoner, narrowly surviving severe typhus. The British government negotiated a prisoner release, and Horrocks left Russia on 29 October, returning home on the Royal Navy cruiser HMS Delhi.

=== Back home ===
Horrocks rejoined the 1st Battalion of his regiment, based in Germany with the British Army of the Rhine. His time was enjoyable for him, later writing:

For us in the occupation forces life in Cologne was very pleasant, because, owing to the chronic inflation of the German mark, we always had plenty of money, a most unusual experience for me.

He then followed the battalion back to the United Kingdom during the 1921 coal strike, then to Ireland, which was then embroiled in the Anglo-Irish War. His duties included searching for arms and dealing with ambushes and roadblocks, which he called "a most unpleasant form of warfare". This was followed by a short period in Silesia to deal with tensions between the Polish and German populations.

On his return to Britain, Horrocks took up the modern pentathlon. He competed successfully in army tournaments, and was picked for the British Olympic team for the 1924 Paris Olympics, where he finished 19th out of 38. Horrocks spent the remainder of the inter-war years in postings that included adjutant for the 9th Battalion, Middlesex Regiment of the Territorial Army (1926–1930); student at the Staff College, Camberley (1931–32); Staff Captain at the War Office (1934–36); brigade major with the 5th Infantry Brigade (1936–38); and instructor at the Staff College. The Territorial Army posting, which Horrocks considered to be among his happiest periods, provided experience in dealing with citizen soldiers, "those truly remarkable people, the British territorials", which would prove highly valuable during the Second World War. He received a brevet majority in 1935, and was promoted to substantive major in 1936, and brevet lieutenant colonel in 1937.

In 1928, Horrocks married Nancy Kitchin, daughter of an architect for the Local Government Board. They had one child, a daughter named Gillian, who drowned in 1979 while swimming in the River Thames, with "the shock and loss" being "almost insupportable".

== Second World War ==
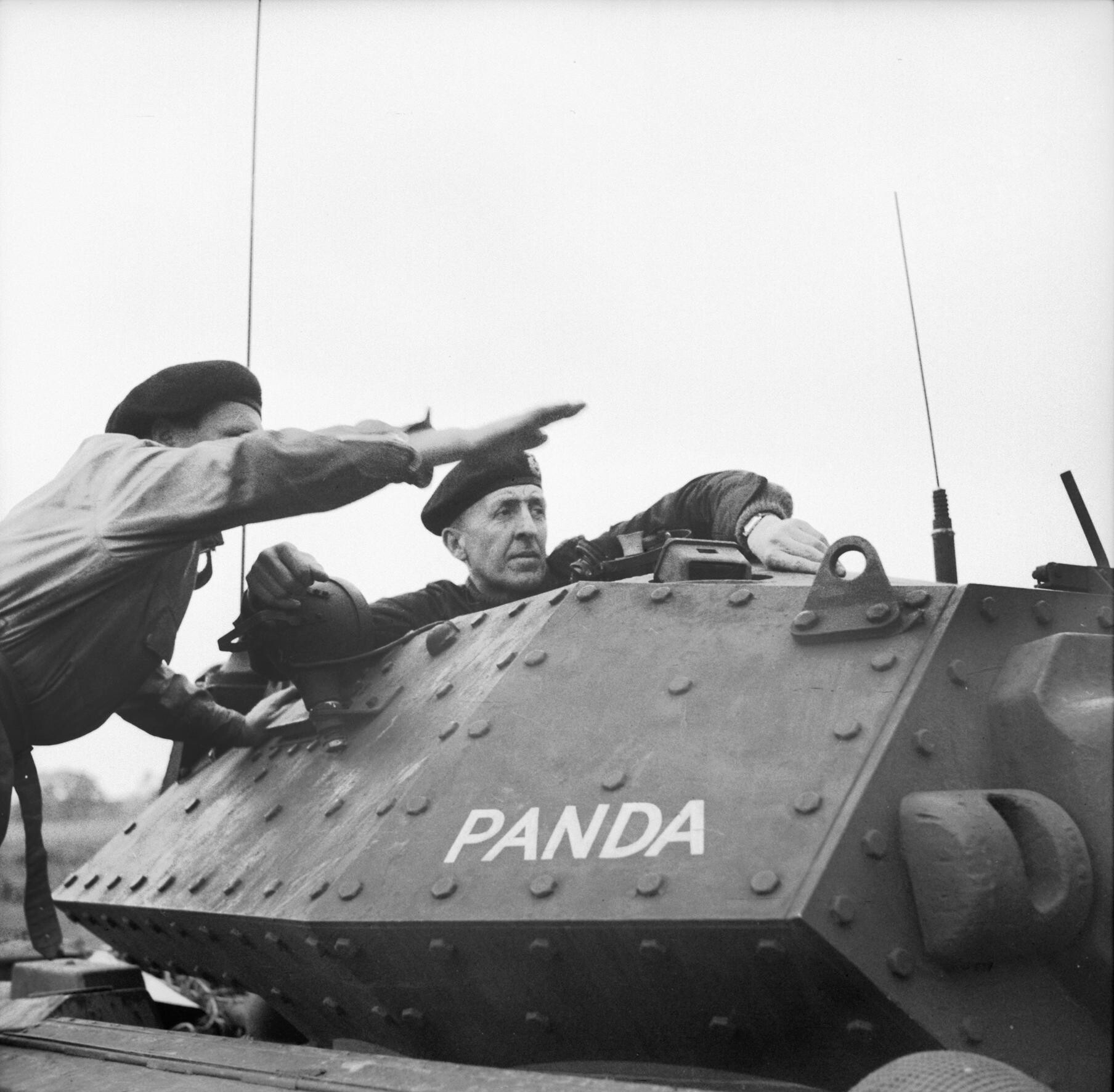
Major General Brian Horrocks, then General Officer Commanding (GOC) 9th Armoured Division, in his Covenanter command tank during an exercise, 18 July 1942

=== Belgium and France ===
At the outbreak of the Second World War, Horrocks was working as an instructor at the Staff College, Camberley, where he had taught since 1938. After helping organise a new, shorter, officer-training course, in December 1939 he was promoted to substantive lieutenant colonel. The following May, he was despatched to France to command the 2nd Battalion, Middlesex Regiment, a machine-gun battalion directly subordinate to the 3rd Division headquarters of Major-General Bernard Montgomery. British doctrine at the time retained heavy machine guns under the direct command of a corps or division, rather than as an organic part of subordinate formations. He joined the battalion during its retreat to Dunkirk, and after only 17 days had impressed his superiors sufficiently to be given the temporary rank of brigadier, and the command of 11th Brigade. The brigade's previous commander, Kenneth Anderson, had been promoted to General Officer Commanding (GOC) 3rd Division during the evacuation, when Lieutenant-General Alan Brooke, commander of II Corps, was recalled to the United Kingdom and Montgomery took over the corps.

=== Home service ===
On Horrocks' return to Britain, he was given command of 9th Brigade and assigned to defend against a possible German invasion. A short stint as Brigadier General Staff of Western Command followed, before promotion to acting major-general and command of the 44th (Home Counties) Infantry Division on 25 June 1941. He was promoted to substantive colonel on 28 May 1941 (with seniority backdated to 1 July 1940). The 44th Division, composed of the 131st (Surrey), 132nd (Kent) and the 133rd (Sussex) Infantry Brigades together with supporting units, was stationed in Kent preparing to repel the expected German invasion of the United Kingdom. The division was responsible for the southern Kent coast east of Folkestone and was serving under the command of XII Corps, commanded by Montgomery, who secured for Horrocks his new command.

In March 1942, Horrocks was given command of the newly formed 9th Armoured Division and gained the temporary rank of major-general on 27 June. Horrocks, an infantry soldier with no experience in dealing with cavalry, was an unusual choice for commander of an armoured division. He trained the division hard, organising exercises to improve the effectiveness of his troops, and to familiarise himself with armoured warfare. Despite never having commanded a division in battle, he was further promoted to acting lieutenant-general and sent to Egypt to command the Eighth Army's XIII Corps, under Montgomery. General Sir Harold Alexander and Lieutenant-General Montgomery had decided to make a "clean sweep" when replacing the dismissed General Sir Claude Auchinleck as Commander-in-Chief (C-in-C) Middle East and Eighth Army commander respectively. Officers perceived to have failed under the old regime were removed, and Montgomery's favoured commanders were brought in. Among these was Horrocks, as Montgomery later explained:

I decided to ask Alexander to get General Horrocks flown out from England at once to command the 13 Corps. Horrocks had been in my 3rd Division as a battalion commander; I had got him a brigade and then a division in my corps in England; I now wanted him to have a corps in my Army. I knew I could not have a better man and so it turned out; he was exactly what was wanted for the job which lay ahead.

=== North Africa ===
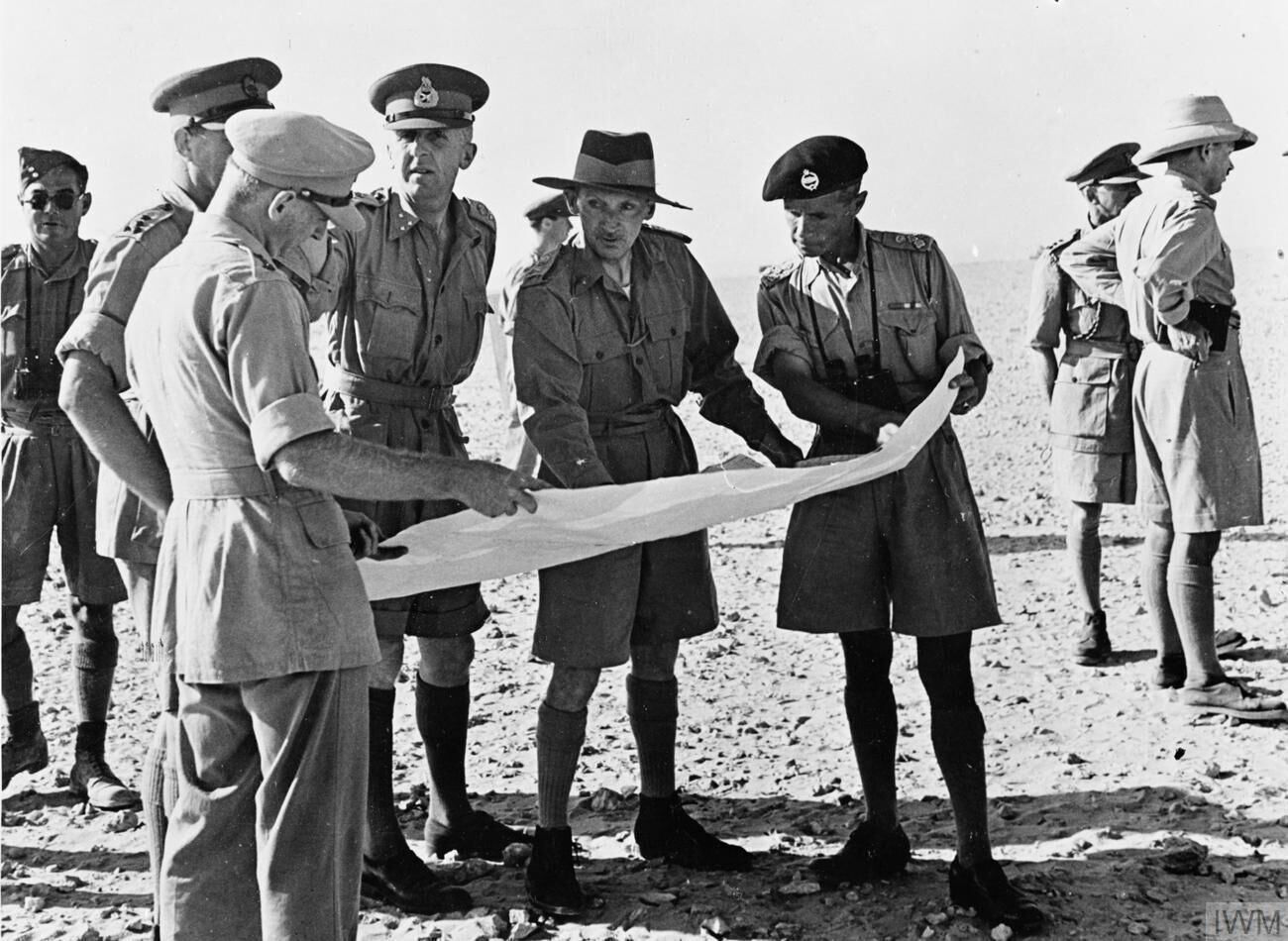
Lieutenant-General Bernard Montgomery, the new commander of the British Eighth Army, and Lieutenant-General Brian Horrocks, the new GOC XIII Corps, discussing troop dispositions at 22nd Armoured Brigade HQ, 20 August 1942. The brigade commander, Brigadier Philip Roberts, wearing beret, is on the right.

On arriving in North Africa, Horrocks' corps was ordered to defend the Alam el Halfa ridge in northwestern Egypt from an expected attack by the Afrika Korps. Concerned that heavy casualties would jeopardise his planned El Alamein offensive, Montgomery instructed Horrocks to repel Erwin Rommel's forces "without getting unduly mauled in the process". Horrocks prepared for a purely defensive battle, with his armour dug in around the ridge. When the Germans attacked on 30 August, they failed to lure the British tanks towards their 88 mm guns—a tactic that had previously been used with great success—and found themselves battered by both artillery and the Desert Air Force (DAF). The battle ended with the Germans in control of Himeihat hill, but at a high cost, and the Allied forces unwilling to try to re-take it after a failed attack by the 2nd New Zealand Division. The army's defensive success raised morale, and Horrocks was praised by his subordinate, Brigadier Philip Roberts, for his "wonderful knack of inspiring confidence and enthusiasm wherever he goes". Montgomery, too, was pleased, saying "he deserves great credit for his action on that day".

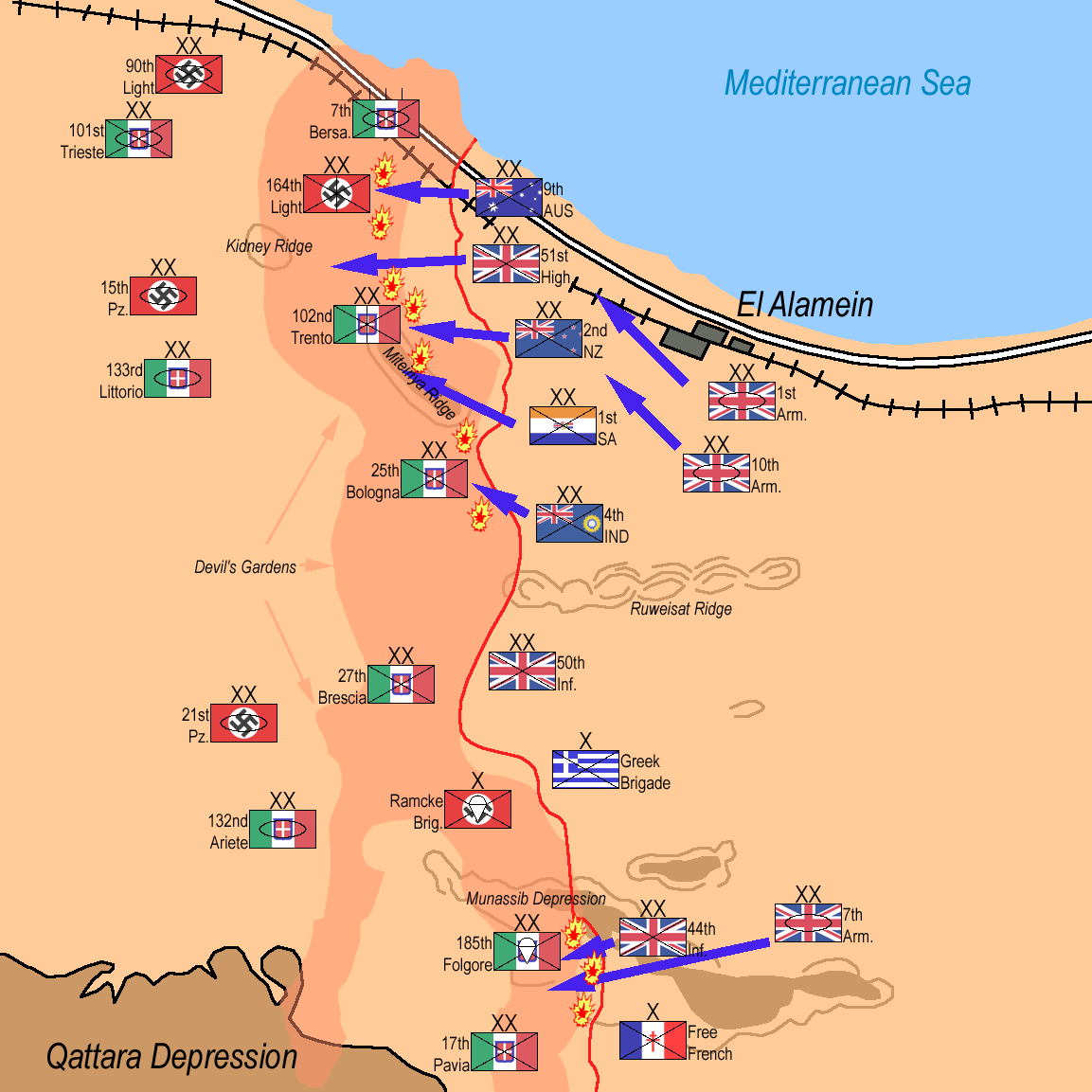
During the attack at El Alamein, 23 October 1942, the 7th Armoured Division, 44th Division and the 1st Free French Brigade of Horrocks' XIII Corps made a feint to the south.

Horrocks was offered the command of X Corps, an armoured corps, in the planned Alamein battle. He refused it, believing that Major-General Herbert Lumsden, a cavalry officer, would be more suited to the role. Instead he retained command of XIII Corps, and was given the task of making a feint to the south to deceive Axis forces, while the main thrust was made by XXX Corps and X Corps to the north. Montgomery told Horrocks that he was not to incur tank losses, so XIII Corps' offensive operations were limited to raids.

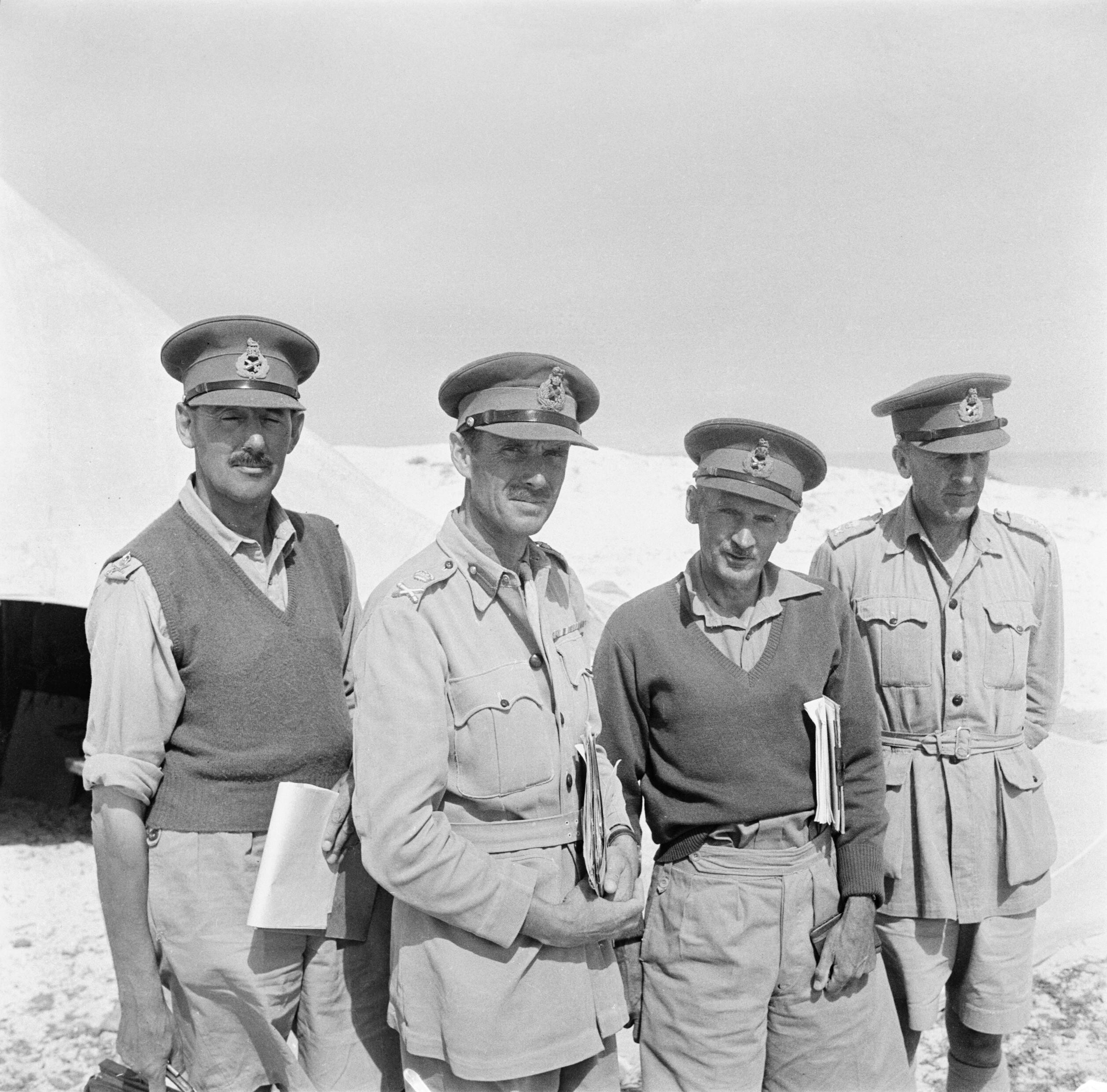
Lieutenant-General Bernard Montgomery in North Africa, late 1942 with his three corps commanders, from left to right: Lieutenant-General Sir Oliver Leese, GOC XXX Corps, Lieutenant-General Herbert Lumsden, GOC X Corps, Lieutenant-General Montgomery, Lieutenant-General Brian Horrocks, GOC XIII Corps

In the aftermath of the landmark British victory that followed, Horrocks' corps was assigned to the reserve and was reduced in size while the rest of the Eighth Army pursued the retreating Axis forces, "while poor old 13 Corps became the 8th Army's Mrs. Mopp, left behind with the unpleasant task of clearing up the battlefield of Alamein". At one point the only formation under his command was a salvage unit clearing the wreckage of the battlefield, which he visited daily. In December, he relinquished command of XIII Corps to Lieutenant General Miles Dempsey and took over command of X Corps, the lead corps in the advance of the Eighth Army, after Lumsden's dismissal for his perceived poor performance during the pursuit. Horrocks was appointed a Companion of the Distinguished Service Order on 31 December 1942 "in recognition of gallant and distinguished services in the Middle East".

Following the fall of Tripoli in January 1943, the remaining Axis forces retreated to defensive positions in Southern Tunisia, in front of the Mareth Line built by France before the war. Here in March, Horrocks carried out one of his most successful actions. His corps, composed of the 1st Armoured Division, a Free French brigade and the attached New Zealand Corps (which included the 2nd New Zealand Division and the British 8th Armoured Brigade), was ordered to attack as part of Operation Supercharge II after XXX Corps failed to breach the line. He carried out a flanking manoeuvre through a pass judged by the Germans to be impenetrable, rendering the Mareth position untenable and forcing the Axis into another retreat. Three Italian divisions were destroyed, and the German 15th and 21st Panzer Divisions and the 164th Division were heavily depleted.

Horrocks continued to command X Corps in the following weeks before being transferred to the First Army to take over IX Corps after its previous commander, Lieutenant-General John Crocker, was wounded in a training accident. Also transferred with him from the Eighth Army to the First Army were the 7th Armoured and 4th Indian Divisions and the 201st Guards Brigade, all highly experienced veterans of the desert. He led this corps in the final Allied offensive in Tunisia during April and May 1943, capturing Tunis and accepting the surrender of the remnants of Rommel's Army Group Africa. He was mentioned in despatches on 24 June, and for his service in Tunisia, was appointed a Companion of the Order of the Bath on 5 August. He was also given the rank of temporary lieutenant-general and war substantive major-general.

In June 1943, after returning to command of X Corps, Horrocks sustained serious injuries during an air raid at Bizerte, while watching an amphibious rehearsal by the 46th Infantry Division for Operation Avalanche, the Salerno landings. Bullets from a strafing German fighter struck his upper chest and carried on through his body, piercing his lungs, stomach and intestines. He underwent five operations and spent fourteen months recovering. He was replaced as GOC of X Corps by Lieutenant-General Sir Richard McCreery.

=== Northwest Europe ===
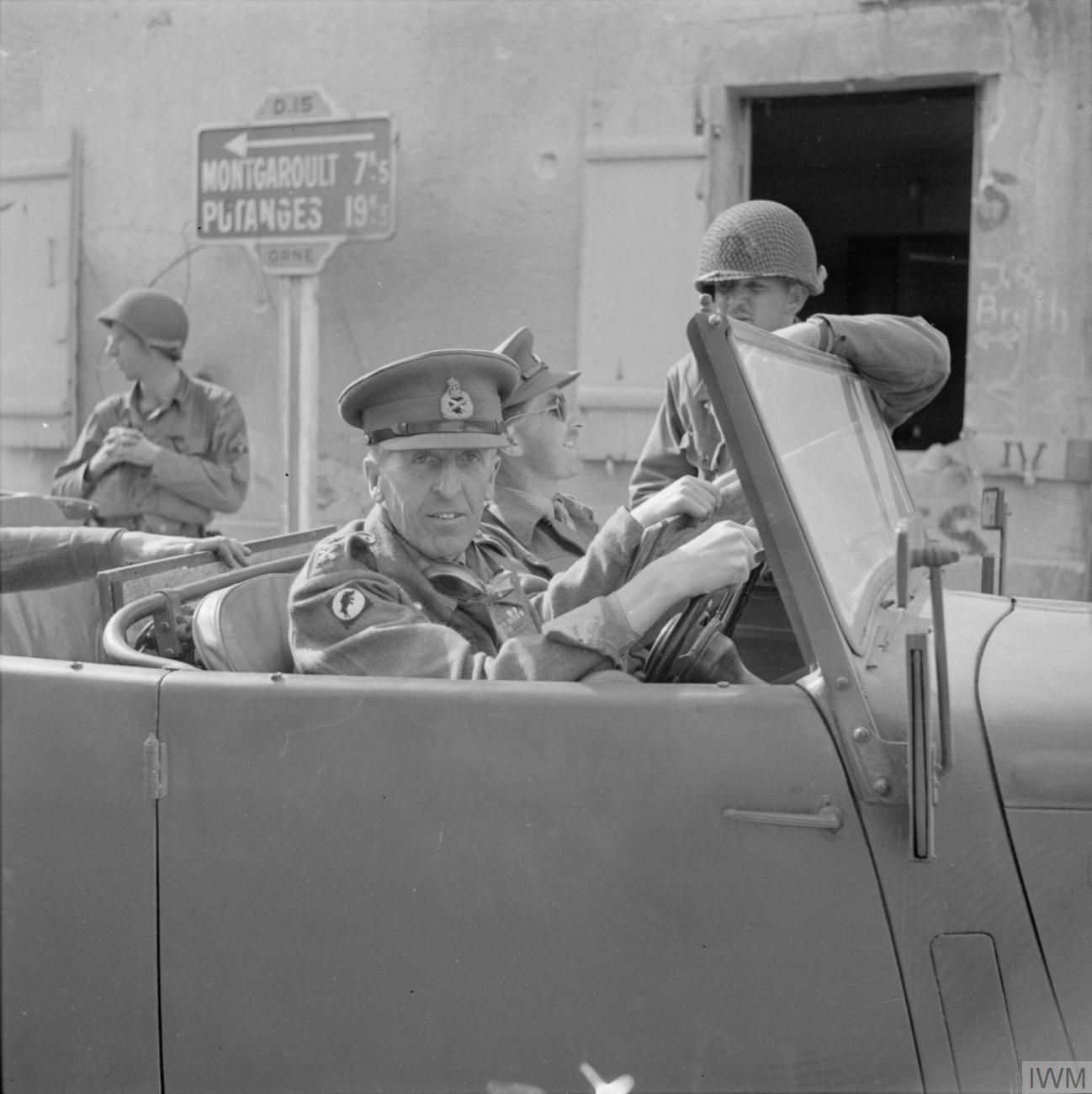
Lieutenant General Brian Horrocks, the newly appointed GOC XXX Corps, in his staff car with American troops in Argentan, 21 August 1944.

It was a year before Horrocks recovered sufficiently to tell Field Marshal Sir Alan Brooke, the Chief of the Imperial General Staff (CIGS), that he was "very anxious to be given another corps". Restored to the acting rank of lieutenant-general in August 1944, he was sent to France to assume command of XXX Corps during the cataclysm engulfing the trapped German 7th Army and 5th Panzer Army in the Falaise Pocket. Montgomery had been dissatisfied with the performance of the corps and its GOC, Gerard Bucknall, a fellow Middlesex Regiment officer, since the landings in Normandy two months earlier. Horrocks retained control of XXX Corps during the advance through Belgium, taking Brussels, and at one point advanced 250 miles (400 km) in only six days. Supplies were a constant concern; the major French deep-water ports were still in German hands, and Allied supply lines stretched back to the Normandy beaches. Montgomery's 21st Army Group was by now operating 300 miles (480 km) from its ports—twice the distance logistical planners had accounted for—so XXX Corps was diverted towards Antwerp to secure its docks and harbour. The city and port fell to the 11th Armoured Division in early September, but Montgomery halted XXX Corps for resupply short of the wide Albert Canal to the north of the city, which consequently remained in enemy hands. Horrocks regretted this after the war believing that his corps might have advanced another 100 miles (160 km) with the fuel available. Although some doubt this could have been achieved without delays, it is now known that XXX Corps was opposed by only one German division, although Allied forces were unaware of this at the time. The pause allowed the Germans to regroup around the Scheldt River, and by the time the Allies resumed their advance, the First Paratroop Army (General Kurt Student) had arrived and set up strong defensive positions along the opposite side of the canal. The task of breaking the strengthened German line, which stretched from Antwerp to the North Sea along the Scheldt River, would fall to the First Canadian Army in the month-long, costly Battle of the Scheldt. By mid-September, XXX Corps had been diverted again, this time to the east.

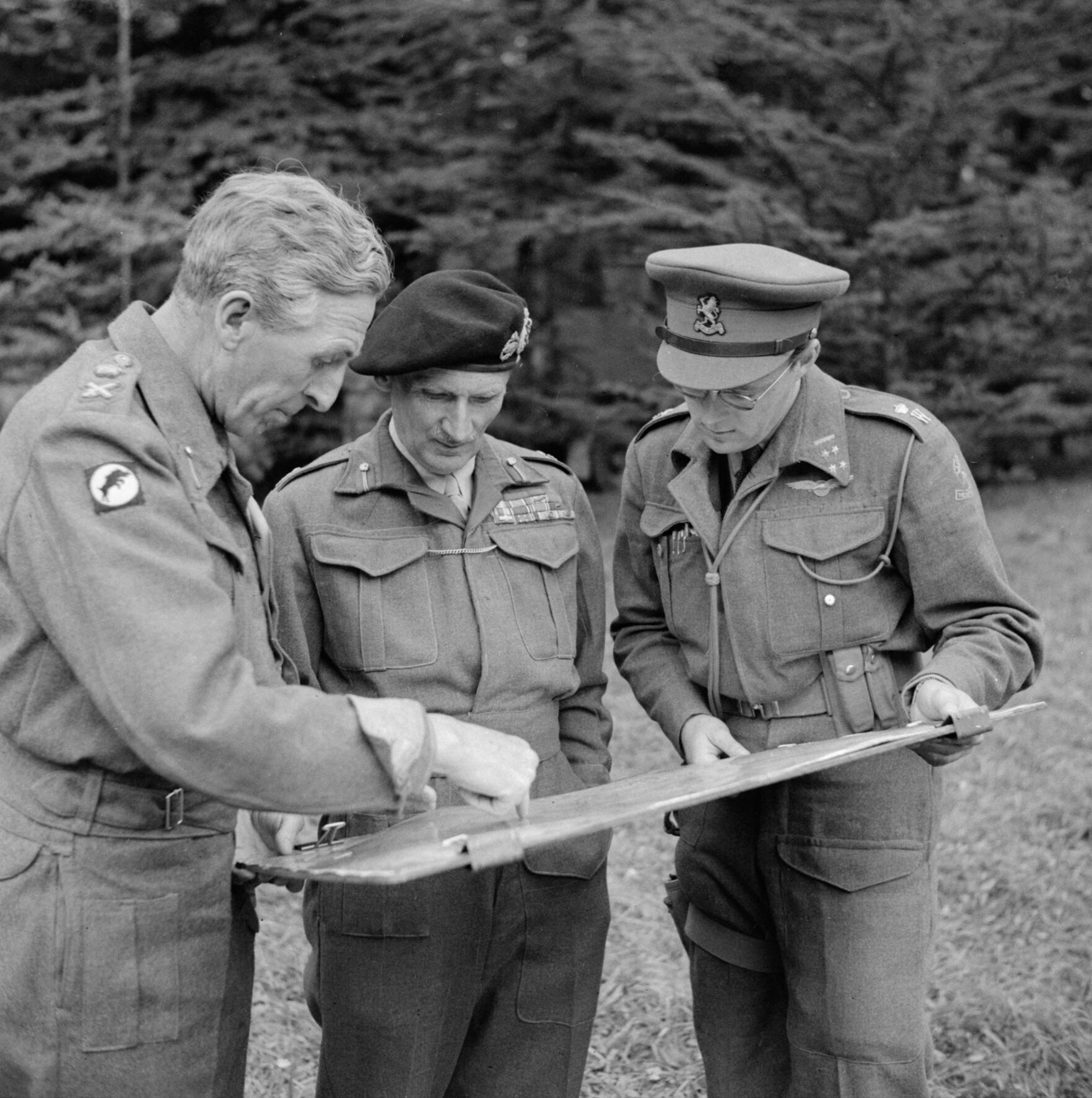
Field Marshal Montgomery studies a map with Lieutenant General Brian Horrocks (left), GOC XXX Corps, and Prince Bernhard of the Netherlands (right), GOC all Dutch forces under Monty's command, 8 September 1944.

==== Operation Market Garden ====
In September, Montgomery, now a field marshal, made his planned ambitious thrust across the Rhine and into the German industrial heartland, codenamed Operation Market Garden, a priority for 21st Army Group. XXX Corps under Horrocks was to lead the ground assault, passing along a corridor held by airborne forces to link up with the British 1st Airborne Division in Arnhem within four days. In any event XXX Corps never arrived and although 1st Airborne clung on to their tenuous position for a further five days, by 21 September almost three-quarters of the division was destroyed or captured.

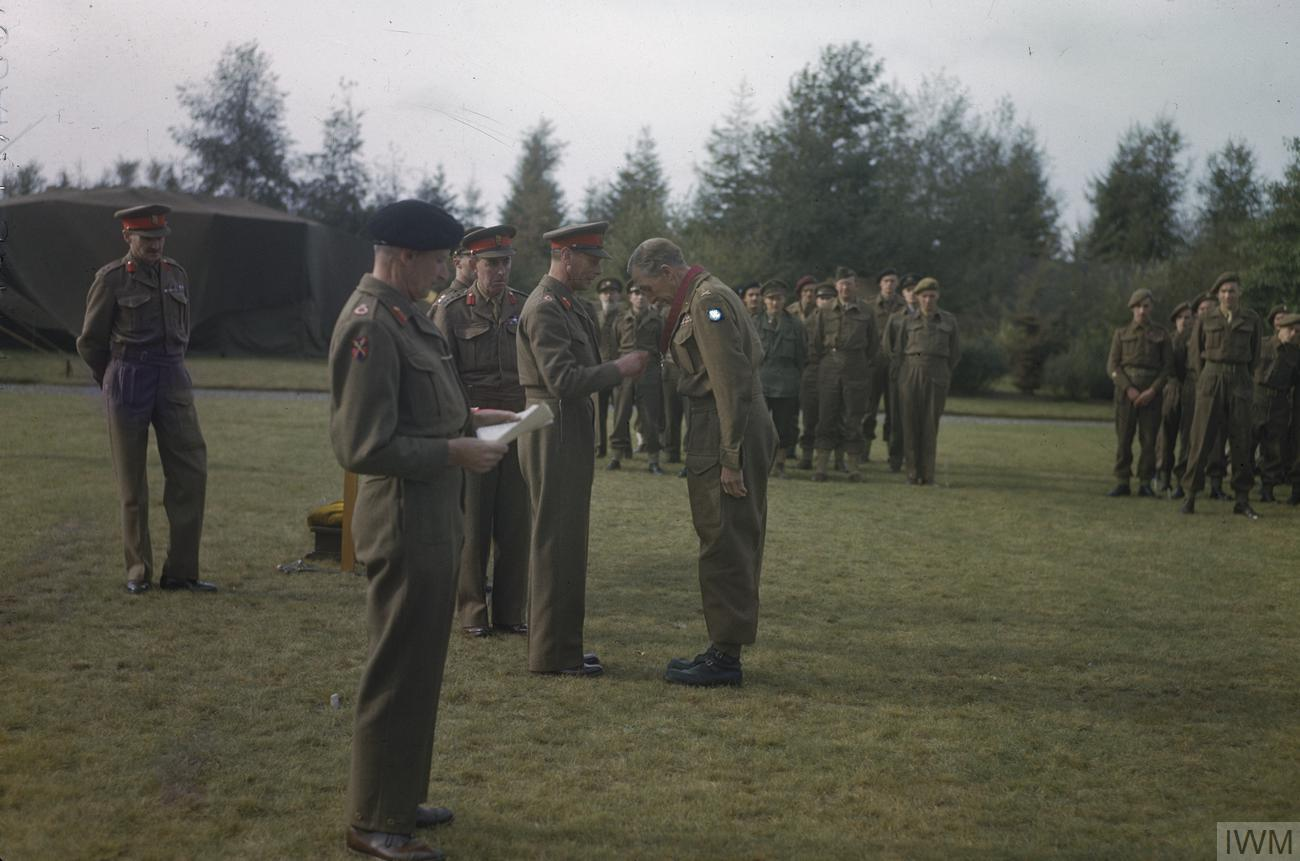
The GOC XXX Corps, Lieutenant General Brian Horrocks is made a Commander of Order of the Bath and receives the Distinguished Service Order from George VI during an investiture at the headquarters of the commander of the 21st Army Group, Field Marshal Sir Bernard Montgomery, 15 October 1944. Field Marshal Montgomery is in foreground.

Postwar analyses have been divided, some stressing a perceived lack of urgency on the part of Horrocks' men, while others note that German defences in the area were severely underestimated by First Allied Airborne Army intelligence. Particularly important was the failure to identify the remnants of two SS Panzer divisions, which after Normandy had been sent to the Arnhem area for rest and refitting; intelligence had stated that only "a few infantry units and between 50 and 100 tanks" were in the Netherlands. However, Ultra reports revealed the movement of the 9th SS and 10th SS Panzer Divisions to Nijmegen and Arnhem, creating enough concern for Eisenhower to send his chief of staff, Lieutenant General Walter Bedell Smith, to raise the issue with Montgomery on 10 September. Montgomery dismissed Smith's concerns and refused to alter the plans for the landing of 1st Airborne Division at Arnhem. Counter-attacks by Army Group B under Generalfeldmarschall Walter Model kept Horrocks' units on the defensive, and delayed their advance by forcing the British to halt and secure their flank. The terrain over which Horrocks' men had to move was also unsuitable, restricting the vanguard (Major-General Allan Adair's Guards Armoured Division) to a single narrow raised highway through flat or flooded countryside. The bridge at Nijmegen, just 8 miles (13 km) from Arnhem, was not captured by the 508th Parachute Infantry Regiment on the first day as planned, and XXX Corps had to assist in its capture on their arrival in Nijmegen two days later, causing a further delay of 36 hours. Horrocks was not personally blamed for the operation's failure although he himself writes in his autobiography that "If we were slow then the fault was mine because I was the commander", further stating that "the sense of desperate urgency was there all right. There could be no doubt about that, and it was not for want of trying that we failed to arrive in time. I don't believe that any troops in the world could possibly have fought better than the Guards [Armoured Division] and the 82nd U.S. Airborne Division when they captured the bridges at Nijmegen. But, after all we were cut off three times, and it is difficult to fight with one hand tied behind you."

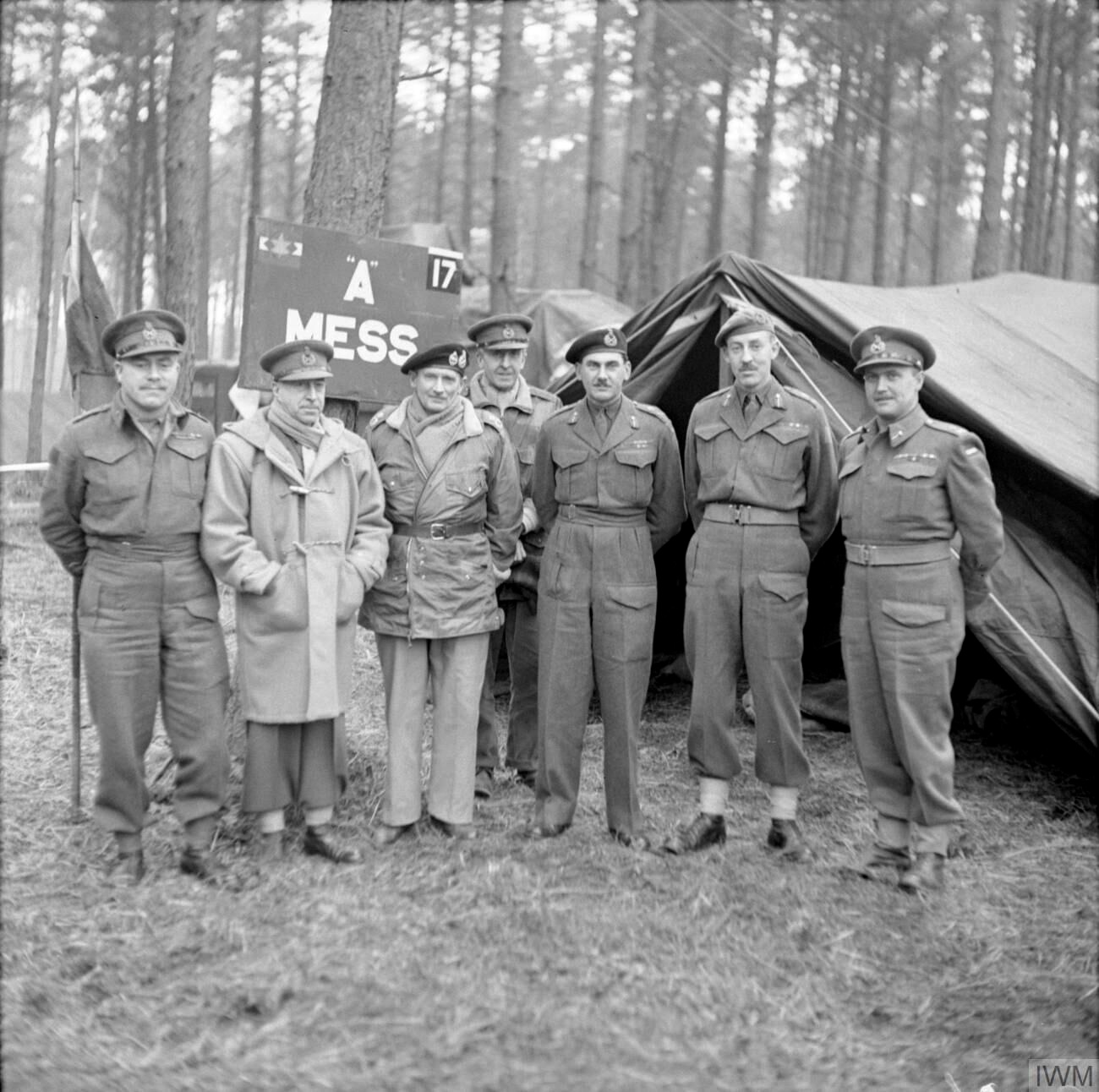
From left to right, Major-General Christopher Vokes, General Harry Crerar, Field Marshal Sir Bernard Montgomery, Lieutenant-General Brian Horrocks, Lieutenant-General Guy Simonds, Major-General Daniel Spry, and Major-General Bruce Matthews, all pictured here in early 1945 during Operation Veritable.

"It is always easy to be wise after the event but, knowing what I do now, I think it would have been better to have committed the 43rd Division on a different axis. Instead of passing them through the Guards on the 22nd, I should have ordered General Thomas [GOC 43rd Division] to carry out a left hook across the lower Rhine much farther to the west and so attack the Germans, who were engaged with the 1st Airborne Division, from behind. This might well have been successful but even then I must emphasise that we should only have been able to establish a bridgehead position on the north bank of the lower Rhine. We could not have advanced any farther as envisaged in our original orders. The failure at Arnhem was primarily due to the astonishing recovery made by the German forces after their crippling defeat in Normandy."

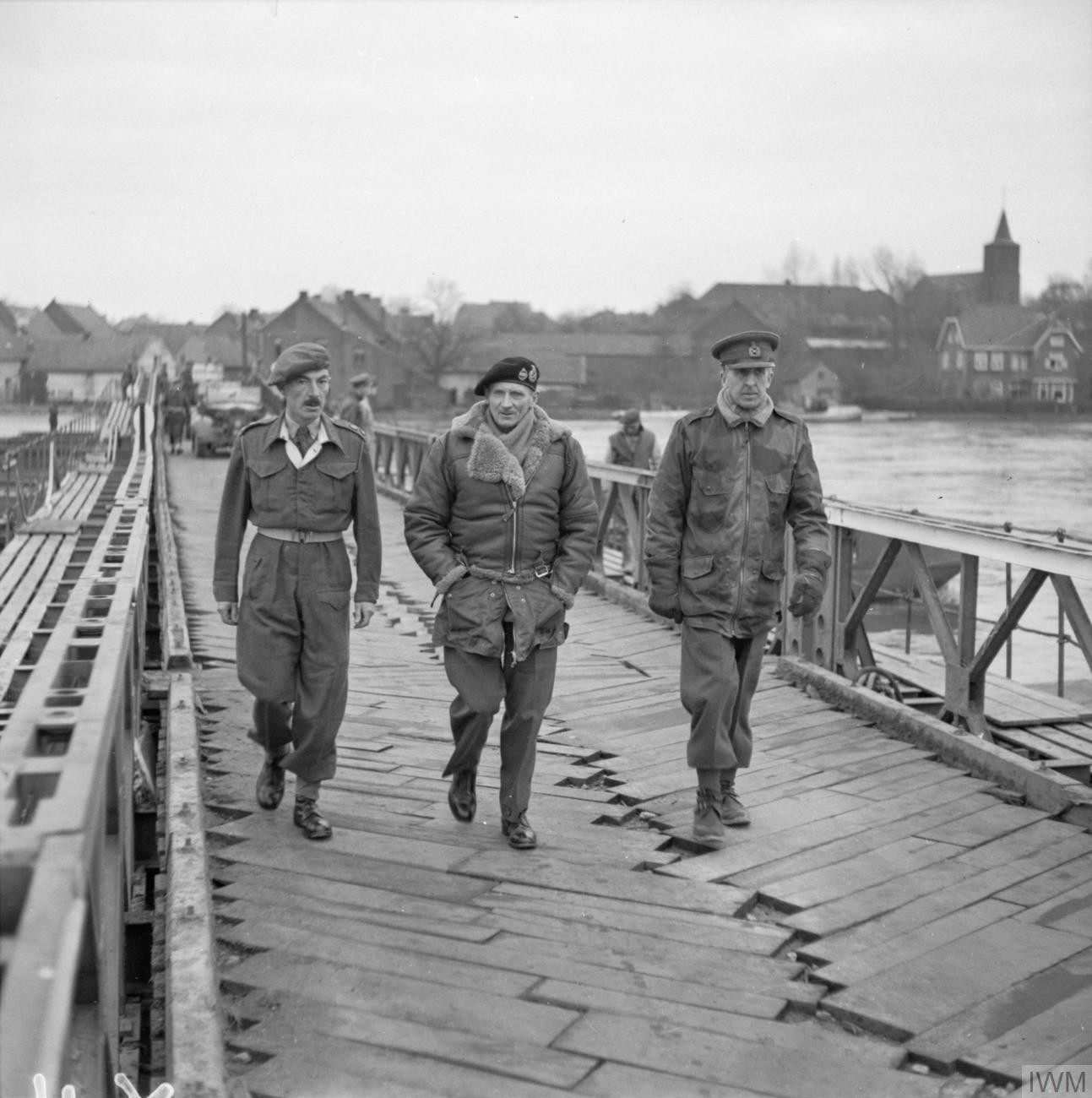
Field Marshal Montgomery with Lieutenant General Brian Horrocks, GOC XXX Corps, and an unknown officer cross a Bailey bridge over the Maas at Berg, 3 December 1944.

"Even if the 2nd German S.S. Panzer Corps had not been in a position to intervene so rapidly, and if we had succeeded in getting right through to the Zuider Zee, could we have kept our long lines of communication open? I very much doubt it. In which case instead of 30 Corps fighting to relieve the 1st British Airborne Division, it would have been a case of the remainder of the 2nd Army struggling desperately to relieve 30 Corps cut off by the Germans north of Arnhem. Maybe in the long run we were lucky."

During the operation and for several weeks after the U.S. 82nd Airborne Division, commanded by Brigadier General James M. Gavin, came under Horrocks' command, and Gavin, impressed by Horrocks, later wrote of him:

He was truly a unique general officer and his qualities of leadership were greater than any I have ever seen. In lecturing at the American service school I stated frequently that General Horrocks was the finest general officer I met during the war, and the finest corps commander.

— James Gavin

In the aftermath of the failed operation, XXX Corps, which also had the U.S. 84th Infantry Division under command in its first battle, took its first German town, Geilenkirchen, as part of Operation Clipper.

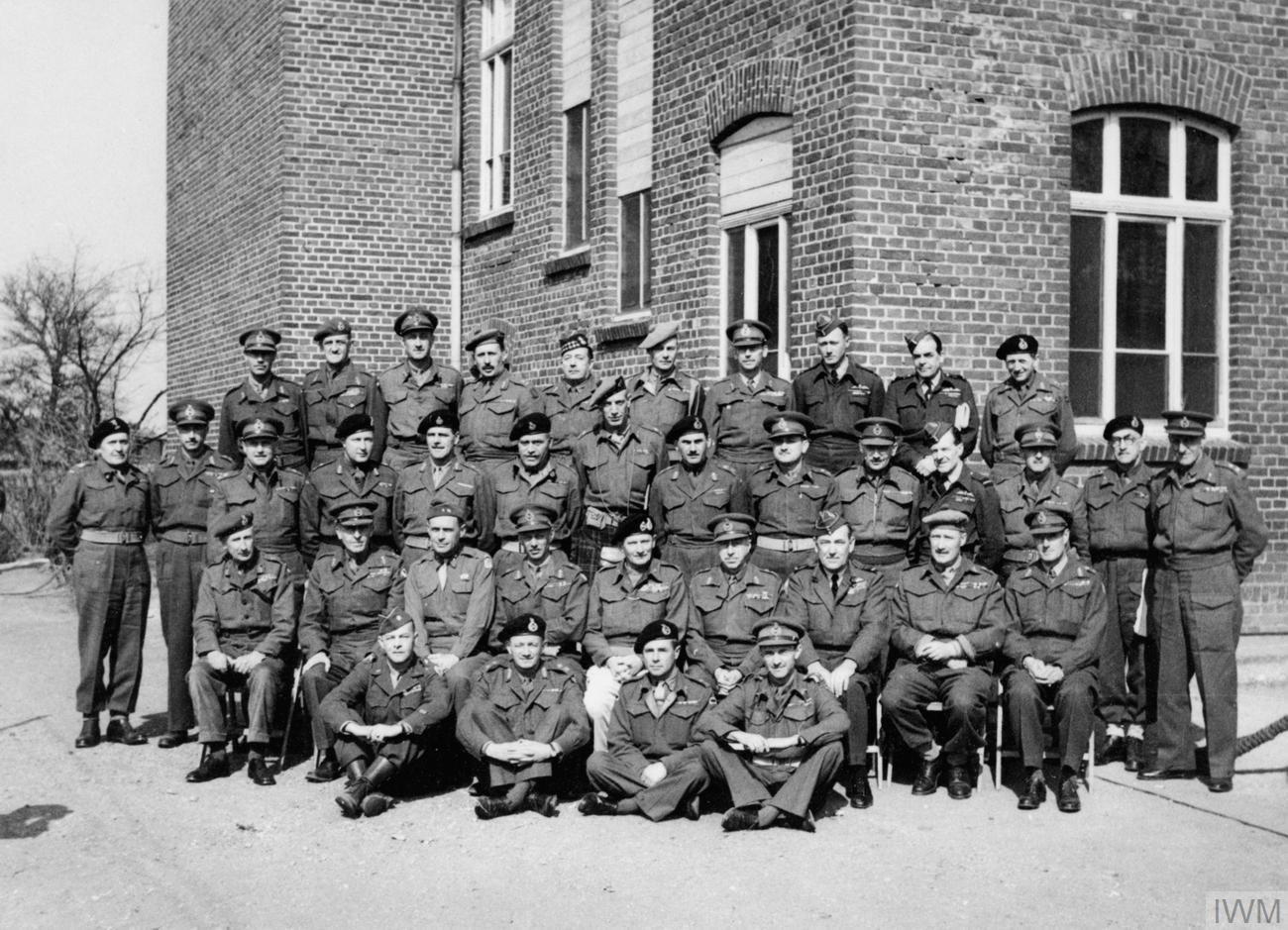
Field Marshal Montgomery poses for a group photograph with his staff, army, corps and divisional GOCs at Walbeck, Germany, after issuing his final orders for the Rhine Crossing, 22 March 1945. Pictured seated, second on the far left, is Lieutenant General Brian Horrocks.

During the Battle of the Bulge, Horrocks was temporarily relieved of his command of XXX Corps by Field Marshal Montgomery and sent back to Britain to rest. Montgomery had taken this move because Horrocks had become "nervy and difficult with his staff" and had "attempted to act foolishly" with XXX Corps. The corps was temporarily commanded by Major-General Ivor Thomas of the 43rd Division.

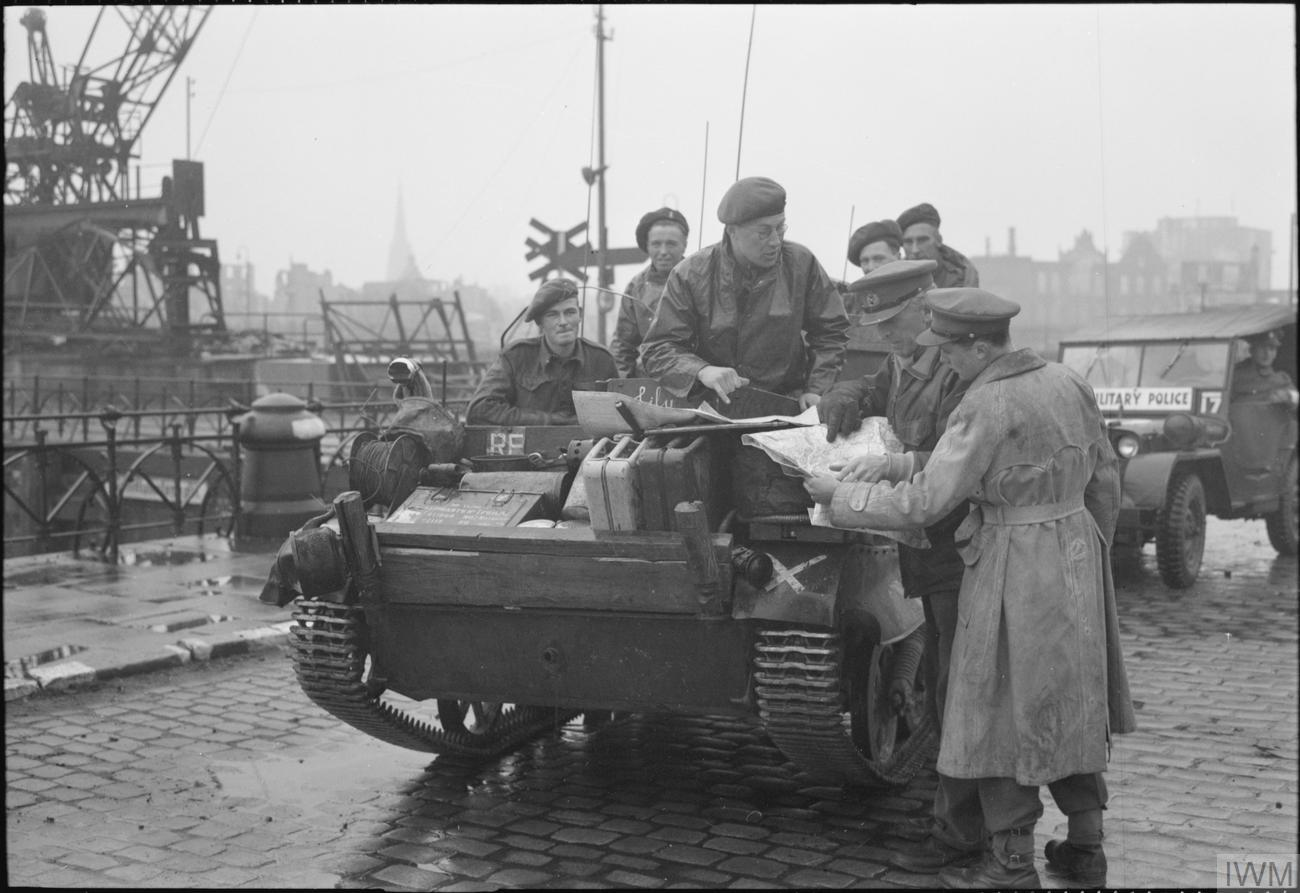
Lieutenant General Brian Horrocks, GOC XXX Corps (standing, second from right), studies maps with officers in a Universal Carrier at the Europa Docks in Bremen, 27 April 1945.

In early 1945, XXX Corps, now transferred from Dempsey's British Second Army to Harry Crerar's First Canadian Army, took part in Operation Veritable, during which the German Army was forced back over the Rhine. The corps employed firepower on a massive scale, and "every trick that had been learnt during the past two and a half years was brought into play, and several new ones added". For a short period XXX Corps had nine divisions under its command. Before the operation, Horrocks accepted an offer to use Bomber Command to attack the town of Cleves, assisting the advance of the 15th (Scottish) Infantry Division. The bombers released 1,384 long tons (1,406 t) of high explosive that devastated the town. Horrocks later said that this had been "the most terrible decision I had ever taken in my life" and that he felt "physically sick" when he saw the bombers overhead. Operation Veritable was successful; by the evening of 9 February (D+1) XXX Corps had broken through the Siegfried Line and into Germany with only light casualties.

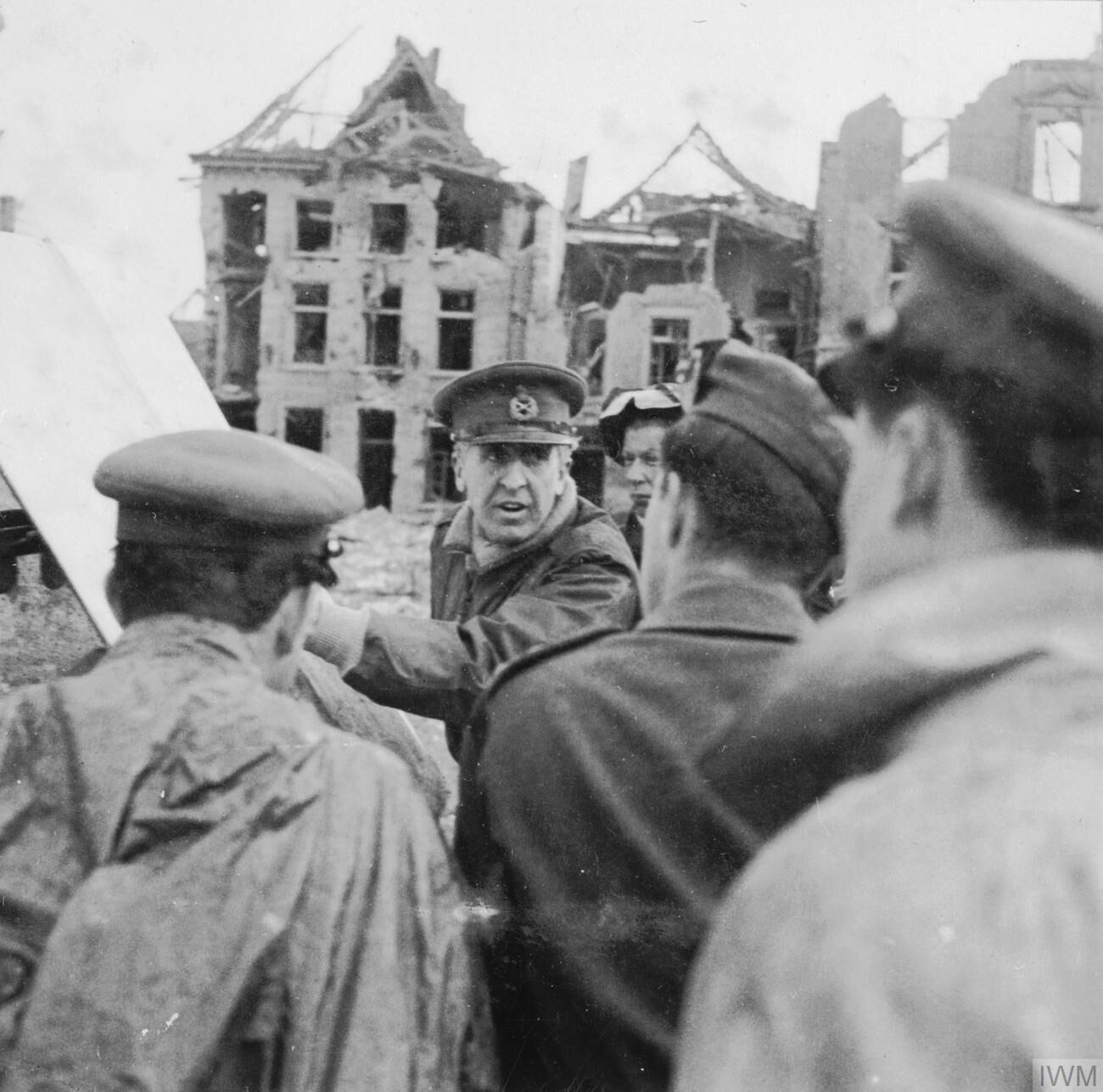
Lieutenant General Horrocks addressing men of XXX Corps at Rees, 26 May 1945. Horrocks carried the map board with him to provide front-line soldiers with an overview.

Aided by Lieutenant-General Neil Ritchie's XII Corps to its right, XXX Corps began crossing the Rhine on 23 March, and, although there was a foothold which had been established, the enemy put up strong resistance, notably at the town of Lingen on the Dortmund–Ems Canal. Thereafter progress was rapid, however, with Bremen–which "produced 6000 prisoners including two generals and one admiral"–being captured on 26 April, exposing the Sandbostel concentration camp, Stalag X-B. XXX Corps had reached Cuxhaven by the time hostilities ceased in May.

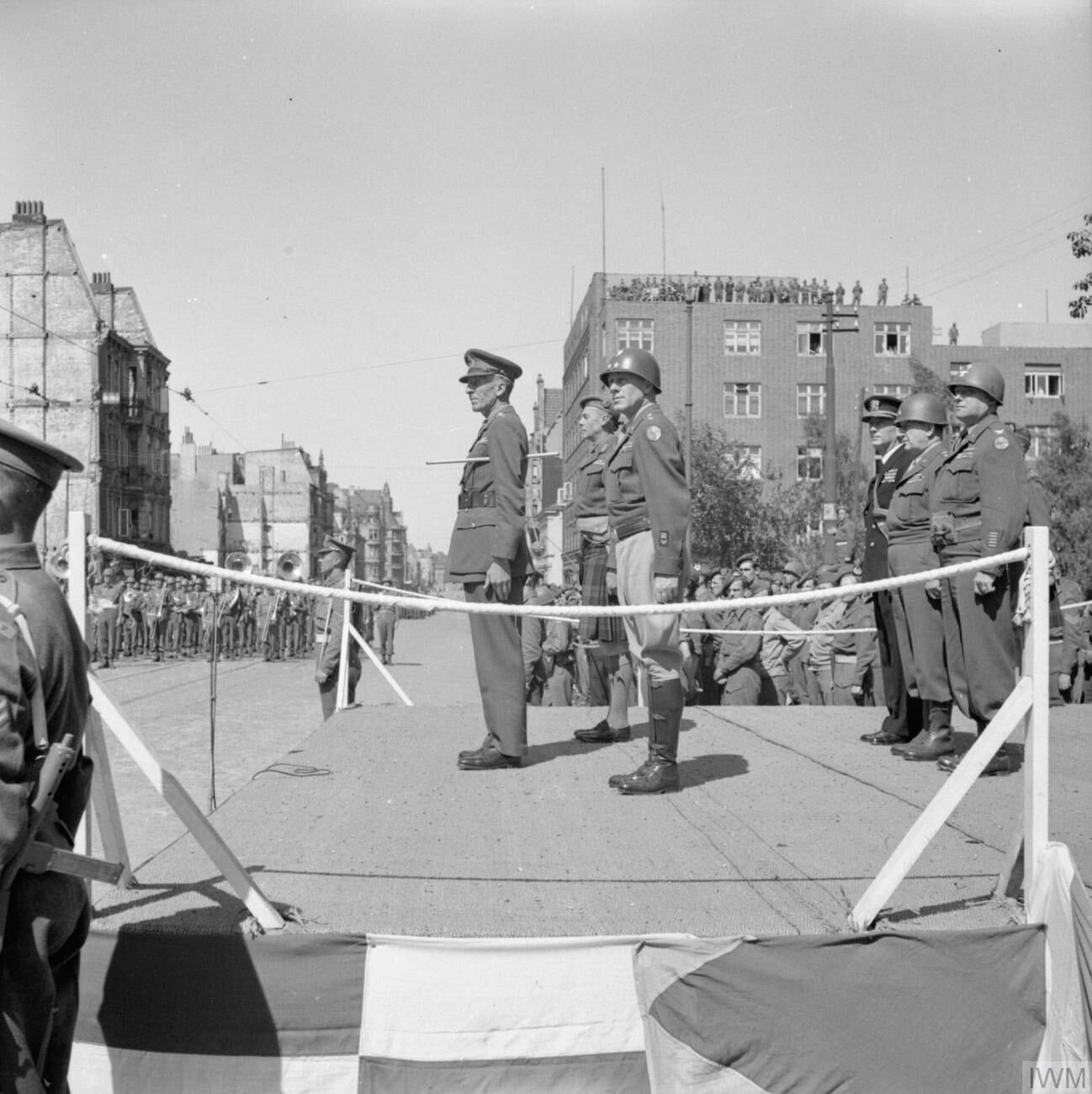
Lieutenant General Brian Horrocks, GOC XXX Corps, Major General Gordon MacMillan, GOC 51st (Highland) Division, and Major General Charles H. Gerhardt, Commanding General U.S. 29th Infantry Division, on the saluting base during the ceremony to mark the handover of Bremerhaven by British to American forces.

Horrocks received two further mentions in despatches for his service in north-west Europe on 22 March and 9 August 1945, and was appointed Knight Commander of the Order of the British Empire on 5 July. He was honoured by the governments of Belgium (the Croix de Guerre 1940 with Palm and Grand Officer of the Order of the Crown with Palm), France (Croix de Guerre and Commandeur of the Légion d'honneur), the Netherlands (Knight Grand Officer of the Order of Orange-Nassau), Greece (Commander of the Order of George I), and the United States (Legion of Merit).

On 12 April 1945, Horrocks met with two German officers just outside the town of Winsen during a ceasefire. A document setting out the terms of a no-fire zone around the Bergen-Belsen concentration camp was typed out and signed by both parties. On the day the camp was liberated by the British Army (15 April 1945), Horrocks organised the rescue of the thousands of inmates by rounding up all the food stores, water trucks and army medical services he could get hold of quickly.

== Post-war career ==
Horrocks continued to serve in the armed forces after the war, initially as General Officer Commanding-in-Chief of Western Command, receiving substantive promotion to lieutenant-general in 1946, with seniority backdated to 29 December 1944. He briefly commanded the British Army of the Rhine, until he fell ill in August 1948; he was invalided out of the service early in January 1949 by the lingering effects of the wounds he had received in North Africa. Promoted to Knight Commander of the Order of the Bath in the King's Birthday Honours that year, he served as Honorary Colonel of a Territorial Army unit of the Royal Artillery.

In 1949 he was appointed Gentleman Usher of the Black Rod, a post traditionally held by retired officers; this appointment was confirmed on the accession of Elizabeth II in 1952. Black Rod has the responsibility of supervising the administration of the House of Lords, controlling admission to it, and taking part in ceremonies. In 1957, Horrocks had the unusual duty of ordering Vivien Leigh out of the House when she interrupted proceedings to plead that the St James's Theatre be saved from demolition. On other occasions, because the Black Rod had to remain in place during long debates, Horrocks relieved his boredom by completing football pools coupons. This had the advantage of looking like note-taking to the assembled lords. Horrocks held the post of Black Rod until 1963.

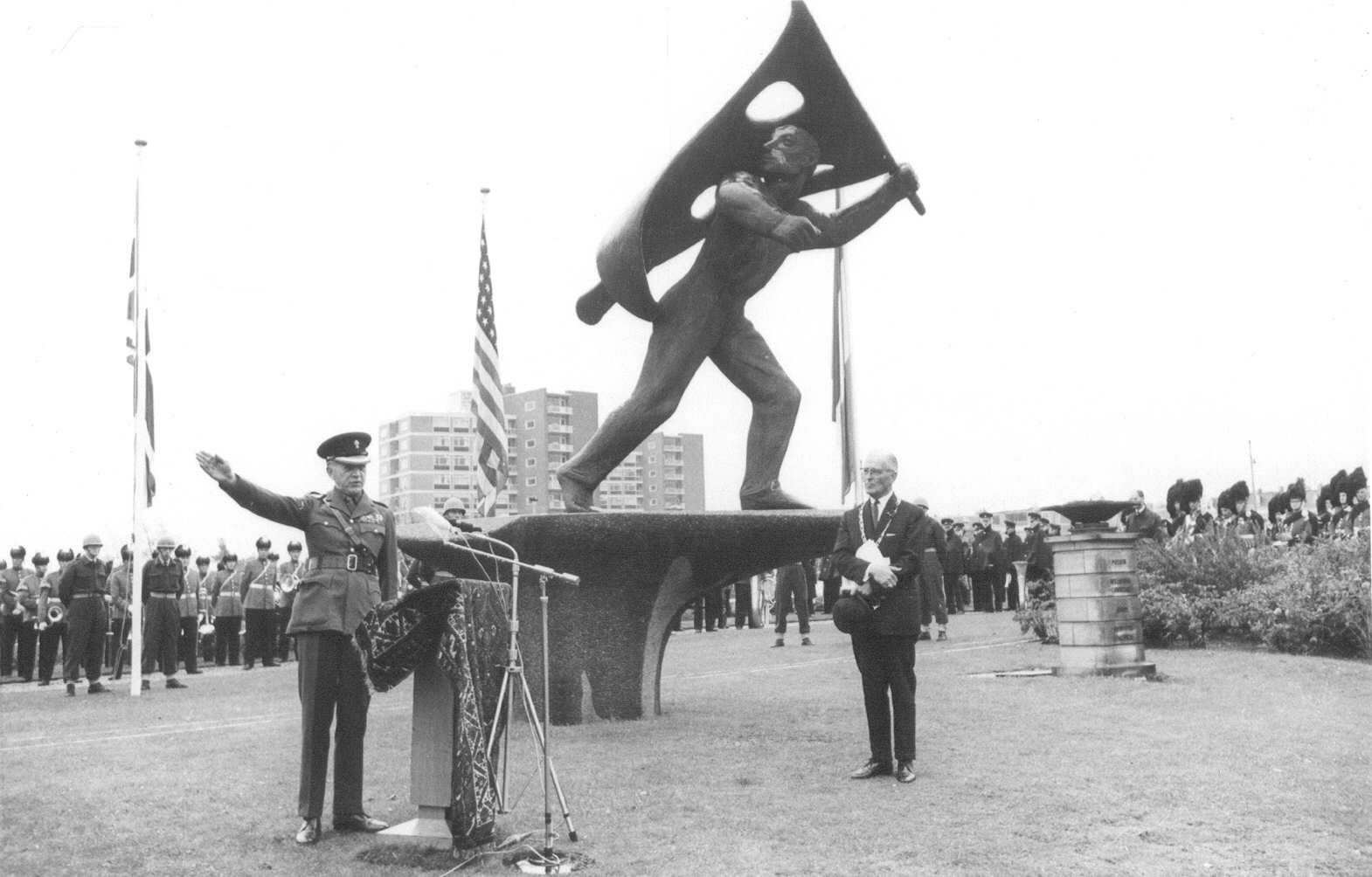
On the twentieth anniversary of the liberation of Nijmegen in 1964, Lieutenant-General Sir Brian Horrocks gives a speech to open the Liberation Museum.

Horrocks became interested in writing, and submitted articles about military matters to newspapers and magazines including the Picture Post and The Sunday Times. This led to a short but successful career as the presenter of a series of television programmes, British Castles (1962), Men in Battle and Epic Battle, produced by Huw Wheldon. In these, Horrocks lectured on great historical battles, "highlighting excitement and interest" to allow the programmes to appeal to the widest possible audience. He was interviewed extensively for the Thames Television series, The World at War, and, to his embarrassment, appeared on the cover of the BBC's Radio Times magazine.

After his television career ended, Horrocks served on the board of the housebuilding company Bovis, and continuing to write, contributing a column to The Sunday Times and editing a series of British Army regimental histories.

In 1968 Horrocks collaborated with J & L Randall as editor of the board game Combat, made by the Merit company. Horrocks' portrait and signature appear on the box and his introduction to the game states: "In war no two battles are ever the same because the terrain is always different and it is this, more than anything else, which influences the composition of the different armies and the tactics employed by the rival Commanders".

His autobiography, A Full Life, was published in 1960, and he co-authored Corps Commander, an account of his battles in north-west Europe, published in 1977.

Horrocks acted as a military consultant for the 1977 film A Bridge Too Far, based on Operation Market Garden. He was also a character in the film, played by Edward Fox. Fox later commented:

I enjoyed all of the films but A Bridge Too Far is the one I enjoyed the most because of the character I had to play, Lieutenant-General Brian Horrocks. Brian was alive then and I knew him well – we were friends until his death. He was a very particular type of general and it was important that I play the role correctly.

— Edward Fox

Horrocks died on 4 January 1985, "at the age of 89 – after having lived a very full life indeed". The memorial service, held at Westminster Abbey on 26 February, was attended by Major-General Peter Gillett and Secretary of State for Defence Michael Heseltine, who represented the Queen and Prime Minister respectively. Thirty regiments and many other formations and associations were represented at the service. He specifically requested a simple ceremony involving no hymns or flowers and just a plain coffin.

His body was cremated but his cremated remains were left at the crematorium, near Chichester, until 2022 when the Princess of Wales's Royal Regiment, a successor to his own Middlesex Regiment, arranged for their private burial at St Paul's Church in Mill Hill.

== Sources ==
- Alanbrooke, Field Marshal Lord (2001). Danchev, Alex; Todman, Daniel (eds.). War Diaries. London: Weidenfeld & Nicolson. ISBN 0-297-60731-6.
- Delaney, Douglas E. (2011). Corps Commanders: Five British and Canadian Generals at War, 1939–45. Vancouver: UBC Press. ISBN 9780774820905.
- Bidwell, Shelford; Graham, Dominick (2004). Fire-Power – The British Army Weapons & Theories of War 1904–1945. Barnsley: Pen and Sword Books. ISBN 1-84415-216-2.
- Doherty, Richard (2014). Victory in Italy: 15th Army Group's Final Campaign 1945. Barnsley: Pen & Sword Books. ISBN 978-1-78346-298-8.
- French, David (2001). Raising Churchill's Army. Oxford: Oxford University Press. ISBN 978-0-19-924630-4.
- Granatstein, J.L. (2005). The Generals – The Canadian Army's Senior Commanders in the Second World War. Calgary: University of Calgary Press. ISBN 1-55238-176-5.
- Horrocks, Sir Brian (1960). A Full Life. Barnsley: Leo Cooper. ISBN 0-85052-144-0.
- Horrocks, Sir Brian; Belfield, Eversley; Essame, Major-General Hubert (1977). Corps Commander. London: Sidgwick and Jackson Limited. ISBN 0-283-98320-5.
- Lamb, Richard (2008). "Brian Horrocks". Oxford Dictionary of National Biography. Oxford University Press. doi:10.1093/ref:odnb/31254.
- Roberts, Major-General G.P.B.; Bayerlein, Generalleutnant Fritz. Basil Liddell Hart (ed.). "U.S. Combat Studies Institute Battle Report: Alam Halfa". Archived from the original on 21 October 2007.
- Mead, Richard (2007). Churchill's Lions: A Biographical Guide to the Key British Generals of World War II. Stroud: Spellmount. ISBN 978-1-86227-431-0.
- Montgomery of Alamein, Field Marshal (2005) [1958]. The Memoirs of Field-Marshal Montgomery. Pen and Sword Books. ISBN 9781844153305.
- Neillands, Robin (2005). The Battle for the Rhine 1944 : Arnhem and the Ardennes : The Campaign in Europe. London: Cassell. ISBN 0-304-36736-2.
- Neillands, Robin (2005). The Desert Rats: 7th Armoured Division, 1940–1945. London: Aurum Press. ISBN 1-84513-115-0.
- Shepperd, Alan (1991). Keegan, John (ed.). Churchill's Generals. London: Weidenfeld & Nicolson. ISBN 0-297-82066-4.
- Smart, Nick (2005). Biographical Dictionary of British Generals of the Second World War. Barnsley: Pen And Sword Books. ISBN 1-84415-049-6.
- Warner, Philip (1984). Horrocks: The General Who Led From the Front. London: Hamish Hamilton. ISBN 0-241-11312-1.

Military offices
Preceded by Noel Mason-MacFarlane	GOC 44th (Home Counties) Infantry Division; 1941–1942	Succeeded by Ivor Hughes
Preceded by Brocas Burrows	GOC 9th Armoured Division; March–August 1942	Succeeded by John D'Arcy
Preceded by William Gott	GOC XIII Corps; August–December 1942	Succeeded by Miles Dempsey
Preceded by Herbert Lumsden	GOC X Corps; 1942–1943	Succeeded by Sir Bernard Freyberg
Preceded by John Crocker	GOC IX Corps; April–June 1943	Post disbanded
Preceded by Sir Bernard Freyberg	GOC X Corps; June 1943	Succeeded by Sir Richard McCreery
Preceded by Gerard Bucknall	GOC XXX Corps; 1944–1945	Succeeded by Alexander Galloway
Preceded by Sir Daril Watson	GOC-in-C Western Command; 1946–1948	Succeeded by Sir Frank Simpson
Preceded by Sir Richard McCreery	C-in-C British Army of the Rhine; April–August 1948	Succeeded by Sir Charles Keightley
Government offices
Preceded by Sir Geoffrey Blake	Black Rod; 1949–1963	Succeeded by Sir George Mills
