= Frederick Maurice (British Army officer, born 1871) =

British Army general and writer (1871–1951)

Major-General Sir Frederick Maurice KCMG CB
- Portrait by Walter Stoneman, 1917
- Born: Frederick Barton Maurice; 19 January 1871; Dublin, Ireland
- Died: 19 May 1951 (aged 80); Cambridge, England
- Spouse: Margaret Helen Marsh (m. 1899; died 1942)
- Children: one son, four daughters (including Joan Robinson)
- Relatives: Frederick Denison Maurice (grandfather); Sir John Maurice (father)
- Military career
- Branch: British Army
- Service years: 1892–1918
- Rank: Major-General
- Nickname: Putty Nose
- Service number: 55071
- Unit: Sherwood Foresters
- Conflicts: Tirah campaign; Second Boer War; World War I; Battle of Mons
- Awards: Knight Grand Cross of the Order of the Bath; Knight Grand Cross of the Order of St Michael and St George; Knight Grand Cross of the Royal Victorian Order; Distinguished Service Order
- Other work: Correspondent, writer, academic

Major-General Sir Frederick Barton Maurice, KCMG, CB (19 January 1871 – 19 May 1951) was a British Army officer, military correspondent, writer and academic. During the First World War he was forced to retire from the army in May 1918 after writing a letter to The Times criticizing Prime Minister David Lloyd George for making misleading statements about the strength of British forces on the Western Front. He also later founded the British Legion in 1921, and served as its president from 1932 to 1947.

== Early life and military career ==
Maurice was born in Dublin, the son of John Frederick Maurice, a British Army officer and military historian, and his wife Anne Frances "Annie" FitzGerald. He attended St. Paul's School and Sandhurst before joining Derbyshire Regiment in June 1892.

His first overseas posting was to British India in 1897–98, during the Tirah campaign. During this time, he served as aide-de-camp to his father, who by now was a major general. After a promotion to captain in 1899, Maurice fought with his regiment in the Second Boer War 1899–1901.

Before leaving for South Africa, he married Margaret Helen Marsh (1874–1942), the daughter of Frederick Howard Marsh, and the sister of Edward Marsh, in 1899 at St George's, Hanover Square.

Maurice was promoted brevet major in November 1900. On returning from South Africa, he entered the Staff College at Camberley, Surrey in 1902. Later that year, he was posted to the War Office, where he worked under Douglas Haig, who later became a field marshal. His daughter Joan was born in 1903. On 10 February 1904 he was appointed as a brigade major of the 19th Infantry Brigade, part of the 10th Division of the IV Army Corps. In June 1908 he succeeded Captain John Duncan, later a major general, as a GSO2 at the War Office.

He was promoted to the substantive rank of major on 19 May 1911, and on 21 January 1913 was Colin Robert Ballard's successor as GSO2 at the Staff College and was granted the temporary rank of lieutenant colonel whilst so employed. His new role was as an instructor in military history under Major General Sir William Robertson, then the college's commandant and later, like Haig, a field marshal.

== First World War ==
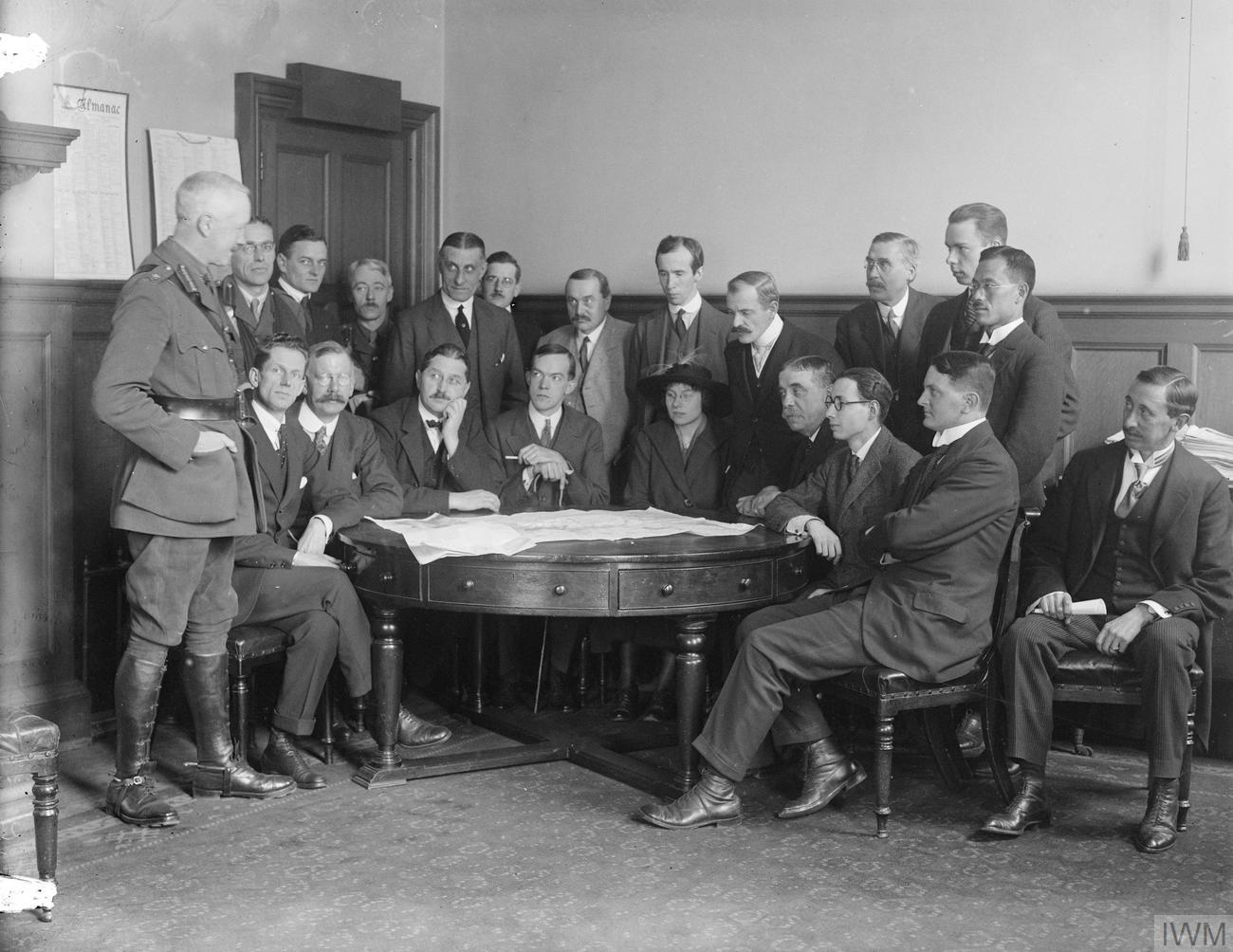
Maurice as Director of Military Operations for the Imperial General Staff, addressing Dominion and Allied journalists

On the outbreak of war in 1914, Maurice was posted to France and assigned to Major General Hubert Hamilton's 3rd Division as its general staff officer, grade 1, or chief of staff, in late August. and saw action at the Battle of Mons. He was promoted to temporary colonel in November 1914 and brevet colonel in June 1915.

In 1915 Maurice, who in February was made a CB, was director of military operations at GHQ (later handing over to "Tavish" Davidson). He wrote papers for the BEF Chief of Staff William Robertson and the Commander-in-Chief Sir John French. (Note: Graham & Bidwell (1993) comment that his papers were "elegant, logical and dispassionate" and that "he resisted pressure" to write what his commander-in-chief wanted to read.)

Maurice stressed that the high troops-space ratio was the main cause of the stalemate on the Western Front, an argument which he would later repeat in his book British Strategy (1929). Because the defender could bring up reinforcements quicker than the attacker could feed in fresh units and move his guns forward, no breakthrough was likely to be achieved without a long preceding bataille d'usure (battle of attrition) elsewhere. Maurice argued that the two types of battle were very different. The former aimed at breaking through to open country even if launched from tactically unfavourable ground, preferably over a wide breach to lessen enemy enfilade fire from the flanks. By contrast a usure should be a series of battles (at least every ten days, as it took the Germans three weeks to bring fresh units from Germany) over ground where the defender had to stand and counter-attack, thus reversing the normal advantage enjoyed by defenders. Good artillery observation and communications (to allow reinforcements of men and shells) were required, not least as the enemy would be retreating towards his own bases whilst the attacker advanced over ground devastated by bombardment. Maurice also argued that the British would not have to the resources to conduct usures until 1917 but that the French must do so until then, and that the Battle of Loos in autumn 1915 was a regrettable waste of resources forced on Britain by the need to cooperate with her French senior partner.

Maurice was strongly critical of proposals to launch a major offensive out of the Ypres Salient (such plans would be discussed for two years before eventually resulting in the 1917 Battle of Passchendaele). He argued that the Ypres Salient, besides being overlooked by enemy artillery, offered few geographical advantages to the attacker. He conceded that an offensive in this sector might lead to the liberation of the ports of Ostend and Zeebrugge provided it coincided with a major French offensive further south. However, unless the Germans withdrew from Belgium entirely, the British would most likely be left holding a longer line stretching to the Dutch frontier, served by two single-track railways from Dunkirk and Hazebrouck-Ypres-Roulers, while the German positions were served by six double-track rail lines. The Belgian Army, currently protected by the coastal inundations of the River Yser, would be able to offer little assistance and would be left holding positions on the new front line which lacked the benefit of such inundations. Maurice recommended that the Ypres Salient itself should either be extended as far as the high ground of Passchendaele Ridge having first taken the ridges south of the city (this is essentially what would happen in 1917), or else (his preferred option) the line should be shortened by a tactical retreat nearer the city. (Note: Graham & Bidwell (1993) comment that pure battles of attrition as Maurice recommended were rare, with the possible exception of the Canadian attack on Hill 70 in August 1917, and that as the war went on both sides learned how to achieve a breakthrough with artillery, tanks and airpower but without a prolonged prior period of attrition.)

After Maurice's departure for the War Office, his former staff at GHQ continued to produce papers for his successor "Tavish" Davidson, pointing out that the BEF had never fought a pure battle of attrition but had rather, both at Loos and the Somme, been attempting to achieve breakthrough and attrition more or less simultaneously; disputes continued to simmer during the planning of the Battle of Passchendaele with both Rawlinson and Plumer producing plans too cautious for Haig's liking.

In 1915 Maurice, who in June was promoted to brevet colonel, was posted to London as Director of Military Operations for the Imperial General Staff, and in 1916 he was promoted to major general. Maurice worked closely with William Robertson, who was appointed Chief of the Imperial General Staff at the end of 1915, ghostwriting many papers which went out over Robertson's signature.

One of Maurice's daughters, Nancy, was the long-term secretary and mistress of Edward Spears, eventually marrying him in 1969 after the death of his first wife Mary Borden. Spears later wrote of Maurice in Prelude to Victory "As imperturbable as a fish, always unruffled ... a rather abrupt manner. A little distrait owing to great inner concentration, he simply demolished work, never forgot anything ... [a] most efficient if not outwardly brilliant second. No man ever wasted fewer words nor expressed himself when he spoke with greater clarity and conciseness".

== Resignation ==
Following the removal of Robertson in February 1918, Henry Wilson, the new CIGS, proposed that Maurice be given command of a division.

Maurice became convinced that troops were being withheld from the Western Front in order to undermine the position of Douglas Haig. The situation became particularly tense after the near catastrophic defeat of Hubert Gough's Fifth Army in late March 1918. When David Lloyd George announced in the House of Commons on 9 April that British troop levels on the Western Front were at all-time highs, Maurice believed that he was deceiving both Parliament and the British public.

Whilst waiting to hand over his job as DMO to Major General Percy de B. Radcliffe, Maurice visited Haig, who offered him not command of a division but a staff post in the new Army being rebuilt from the wreck of the Fifth. Maurice never explained why he declined the offer, although he recorded (15 April) that officers at Haig's staff were dissatisfied with Lloyd George's speech of 9 April. Maurice later claimed not to have read Lloyd George's speech of 9 April until "his attention was drawn to it" whilst in France, 13–16 April. Lloyd George's speech of 9 April had been widely reported in the press and was being discussed by officers at Haig's headquarters, so it seems unlikely, in Grigg's view, that he could have been unaware of it.

Maurice's baby daughter Betty had died, aged not quite one, on 16 March (not mentioned in Nancy Maurice's 1950s book about her father). He was disappointed at being sacked as DMO and at Haig not offering him the division he had been promised. John Grigg also suggests that Maurice inherited something of the inner turmoil and rebelliousness of his grandfather, the Victorian cleric Frederick Denison Maurice.

In his capacity as Director of Military Operations, Maurice knew that the troop statistics available to his office did not bear out Lloyd George's claims. He wrote to Robertson's successor Henry Wilson on 30 April, to outline his position. Wilson did not respond. Hankey later told Liddell Hart in 1932 that he had a friendly conversation with Maurice on the eve of his press letter, telling him that Lloyd George thought highly of him and suggesting a number of suitable jobs for him; Grigg speculates that the conversation might have been at Wilson's behest after Maurice's letter to Wilson, and that the staff post in France (which he had been offered on 15 April) might have been one of the mooted jobs.

Maurice composed his press letter on 2 May but did not yet send it. Robertson wrote to him on 4 May, writing that not too much credence should be given to imminent predictions of Lloyd George's downfall, that Maurice should take especial care to get his facts exactly right, and adding: "You are contemplating a great thing – to your undying credit". Maurice wrote a letter to The Times and other newspapers, criticizing Lloyd George for misleading the public about the state of the British Expeditionary Force during the German spring offensive. The publication of this letter on 7 May caused a political storm, and members of the Liberal opposition, including former Prime Minister H. H. Asquith, called for a debate. This subsequently occurred on 9 May, and Lloyd George was able to imply that the source of confusion was, in fact, Maurice's office, rather than the Prime Minister's.

Maurice was put on half-pay on 11 May, and was soon "retired" from the Army. He was also denied a court martial. However, he was far from disgraced and soon became military correspondent of the Daily Chronicle. He had a friendly exchange of letters with Lord Milner, Secretary of State for War (16 May) in which he agreed to exercise self-censorship in view of the secret information to which he was party. After the Daily Chronicle had been taken over by a consortium answering to Lloyd George, Maurice became a military correspondent for the Daily News.

== Postwar life ==
In 1919, the reviews in the German press that misrepresented his book, The Last Four Months, contributed to the creation of the stab-in-the-back myth. "Ludendorff made use of the reviews to convince Hindenburg."

In a hearing before the Committee on Inquiry of the National Assembly on November 18, 1919, a year after the war's end, Hindenburg declared, "As an English general has very truly said, the German Army was 'stabbed in the back'."

Maurice was never formally exonerated for his role in May 1918. He wrote his own secret account of the incident on 22 May 1918, not published until his daughter Nancy's book in the 1950s. In 1920 Arthur Balfour declined to assist him in getting to the bottom of the statistical dispute, pointing out that while Lloyd George might not have "measured his language" in the debate, he regarded himself as being victim of "a wrong" (in that he had on 9 April, in good faith, presented to the House of Commons figures given to him, and that various different sets of figures had subsequently been produced from the War Office whilst elements in the military attempted to discredit him).

In 1921, Maurice was one of the founders of the British Legion, and although he was not initially very active in the organization, he would later serve as the president from 1932 to 1947. In 1922 Maurice was appointed principal of the Working Men's College in London, an institution founded by his grandfather. He held this position until 1933.

In 1922 Maurice published a series of articles in the Westminster Gazette (a newspaper which favoured the Asquith Liberals, who were opposed to Lloyd George's Coalition Government), which were also published as a pamphlet, Intrigues of the War, in August. He accused Lloyd George of delaying victory in 1917 (Note: Presumably by his intrigues to place Field Marshal Haig under the command of the French General Robert Nivelle, and/or by trying to divert resources to the Italian and Palestine fronts, although Heathorn's book does not specifically say.) and of presenting false statistics to the House of Commons in 1918. This came in the same year as Dewar and Boraston's favourable book about Haig, written with the discreet encouragement of its subject, as the time for a general election drew near.

Cabinet Secretary Maurice Hankey had a low opinion of the military's disingenuous use of statistics and took pride in having assisted Lloyd George in preparing his speech of 9 May 1918. He may well have used his influence in 1925 to block Maurice from becoming Chichele Professor of the History of War at Oxford University (the post went to Ernest Swinton). However, Maurice was appointed Professor of Military Studies at the University of London in 1926. (Note: Graham & Bidwell (1993) give his position as Professor of Military Science at King's College London.) He taught both at London and at Trinity College, Cambridge until the end of his life.

Field Service Regulations were reissued and in 1924 the War Office published "Volume II (Operations)" (from the context, apparently an extension of the FSR) by Brigadier Aspinall-Oglander (Official Historian of the Gallipoli Campaign) assisted by JFC Fuller, then a senior instructor at Camberley Staff College. Partly inspired by this, Maurice gave a series of lectures on strategy and whether or not the art of war could be boiled down to principles, illustrating his talks with historical examples. The lectures eventually formed the basis of his 1929 book British Strategy. (Note: Graham & Bidwell (1993) comment that the book "represent[ed] the orthodoxy of the day" and was "not as profound or stimulating" as the works of Fuller, but "can still be read with profit".)

In 1933 Maurice became principal of East London College. In October 1935 he succeeded Lieutenant General Sir William Marshall as colonel of the Sherwood Foresters.

In his memoirs in the mid 1930s Lloyd George was harsh about Maurice and did not come clean about his own disingenuous use of statistics in the debate (i.e. relying on the figures with which the military had supplied him on 9 April and 18 April, and ignoring the more accurate figures which the military had subsequently produced).

During the Munich Crisis, Maurice volunteered the services of the Legion to the government. He flew to Berlin to meet Hitler for the formation of the short-lived British Legion Volunteer Police Force. Three days before war commenced on 1 September 1939, Maurice, as President of the British Legion, broadcast an appeal to Hitler urging him not to invade Poland, an action which John Grigg attributes to naivety.

Maurice died on 19 May 1951, in Cambridge cared for by his daughter, the economist Joan Robinson.

== Publications ==
- The Russo-Turkish War, 1877–1878 (Special Campaign Series, 1905)
- Sir Frederick Maurice: a record of his work and opinions (Edward Arnold, London, 1913)
- Forty Days in 1914 (Constable and Co, London, 1919)
- The Last Four Months (Cassell and Co, London, 1919)
- The Life of Lord Wolseley (William Heinemann, London, 1924)
- Robert E. Lee, the soldier (Constable and Co, London, 1925)
- Governments and War (William Heinemann, London, 1926)
- An aide-de-camp of Lee (Little, Brown and Co, London, 1927)
- The Life of General Lord Rawlinson of Trent (Cassell and Co, London, 1928)
- British Strategy: A Study of the Application of the Principles of War (Constable and Co, London, 1929)
- The 16th Foot (Constable and Co, London, 1931)
- The History of the Scots Guards (Chatto and Windus, London, 1934)
- Haldane (Faber and Faber, London, 1937, 1939)
- The Armistices of 1918 (Oxford University Press, London, 1943)
- The Adventures of Edward Wogan (G Routledge and Sons, London, 1945)

== Sources ==
- French, David (1995). The Strategy of the Lloyd George Coalition. Oxford University Press. ISBN 978-0-19820-559-3.
- Graham, Dominick; Bidwell, Shelford (1993). Coalitions, Politicians & Generals. Brasseys (UK). ISBN 1-85753-007-1.
- Grigg, John (2002). Lloyd George: War leader, 1916–1918. London: Penguin. pp. 489–512.
- Heathorn, Stephen (2013). Haig and Kitchener in Twentieth-Century Britain: Remembrance, Representation and Appropriation. Routledge. ISBN 978-0-75466-965-4.
- Shirer, William Lawrence (1960). The Rise and Fall of the Third Reich: A History of Nazi Germany. New York City: Simon & Schuster. ASIN B0766DKDLR. LCCN 60006729. OCLC 1286630. OL 5794925M. Wikidata Q138029595.
- Woodward, David R. (1998). Field Marshal Sir William Robertson. Westport Connecticut & London: Praeger. ISBN 0-275-95422-6.
