= Nine Peaks =

Mountain in the country of Canada

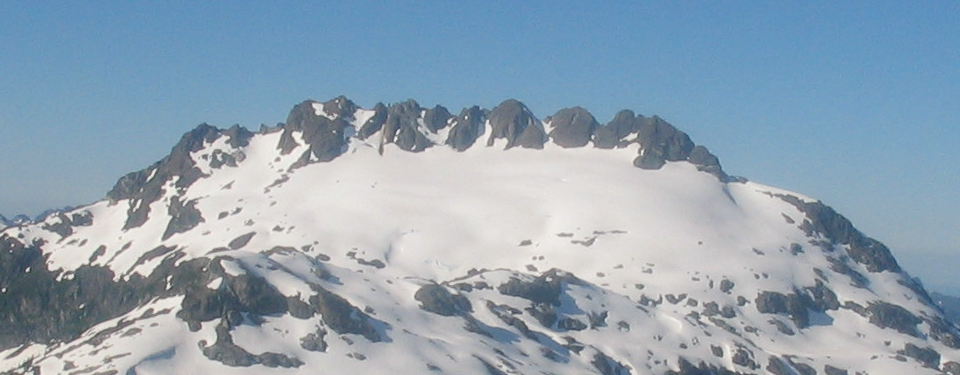

Highest point
- Elevation: 1,848 m (6,063 ft)
- Prominence: 558 m (1,831 ft)
- Coordinates: 49°25′55.0″N 125°32′57.0″W

Geography
- Location within Vancouver Island Location within British Columbia
- Interactive map of Nine Peaks
- Location: Vancouver Island, British Columbia, Canada
- District: Clayoquot Land District
- Parent range: Vancouver Island Ranges
- Topo map: NTS 92F5 Bedwell River

Nine Peaks is a mountain featuring numerous peaks on Vancouver Island, British Columbia, Canada, located 40 km (25 mi) northeast of Tofino and 4 km (2 mi) southeast of Big Interior Mountain.

== History ==
Although there was significant mining activity in the area of Della Lake and Big Interior Mountain prior to the 1950s, no record was made of any ascent of Nine Peaks. The first recorded ascent was by the Syd Watt's Alpine Club of Canada party in July 1955.

== Access ==
Adventurous hikers and mountaineers reach Nine Peaks from Della Lake. Two infrequently accessed routes to Della Lake are:

1. From the base of Della Falls, follow a faint route with bits of flagging up the left (south) side of the falls. The route is steep and mossy, requiring bush and branch climbing.

2. From Bedwell Lake, ascend Big Interior Mountain, cross over to its south summit (Marjorie's Load), and descend to the pass west of Della Lake.

== Gallery ==
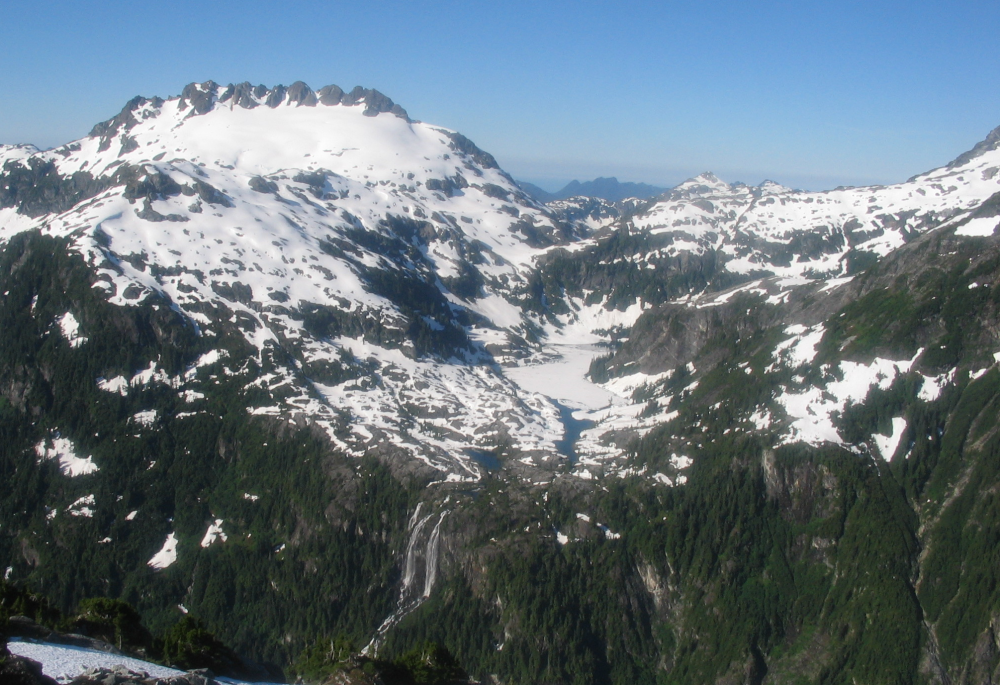
Nine Peaks (left), Della Lake (center) and Della Falls (bottom center), viewed from the East near Love Lake

== See also ==
- List of mountains in Canada
- List of mountains in Strathcona Provincial Park
