= Bidwill =

Bidwill may refer to:

== Places ==
- Bidwill, New South Wales, a suburb of Blacktown
- Bidwill, Queensland, a locality in Queensland, Australia

== People ==
- Bidwill (surname)

== See also ==
- Bidhawal, an Australian Aboriginal people.
- Bidwell (disambiguation)
