= Big Interior Mountain =

Mountain in the country of Canada

- Location within Vancouver Island Location within British Columbia
- Location in Strathcona Provincial Park

Highest point
- Elevation: 1,857 m (6,093 ft)
- Prominence: 572 m (1,877 ft)
- Coordinates: 49°27′38.2″N 125°34′26.0″W

Geography
- Location: Vancouver Island, British Columbia, Canada
- District: Clayoquot Land District
- Parent range: Vancouver Island Ranges
- Topo map: NTS 92F5 Bedwell River

Climbing
- First ascent: 1899 Joe Drinkwater

Big Interior Mountain is in central Vancouver Island, British Columbia. This snow-covered mountain in Strathcona Provincial Park is about 42 km (26 mi) northeast of Tofino and 5 km (3 mi) southwest of Mount Rosseau.

== Name origin ==
On his 1896 map, explorer Rev. William Washington Bolton called the mountain Laing's Neck Range in honour of his companion John Laing, but the name gained no traction. The present name likely came when prospector Joe Drinkwater was first to conquer the summit in 1899. Observing evidence of copper ore, he staked a claim, but no significant mining activity occurred during the following decade.

== Mining ==
In 1912, an investment syndicate, chaired by Rudolph Feilding, 9th Earl of Denbigh, purchased a group of claims on the summit for a quarter of a million dollars. The next year, the earl, and Lady Marjorie, his daughter, joined the inspection team visiting this site called the Ptarmigan Mine. They christened a subsidiary summit of the mountain as Marjorie's Load. In recent decades, this unofficial name has gained popularity among mountaineers.

Extensive work during 1913 and 1914 almost readied the mine for production. Construction included a landing at Bedwell Sound. The wagon road to within 5 kilometres (3 mi) of the mountain base required 25 bridges. To span the 1,500 metres (5,000 ft) distance from the mine site, the former aerial tramway from the Tyee mine on Mt. Sicker was acquired. Planned capacity was a thousand tons per day. A steamer would transport the ore from the sound to the Tyee smelter at Ladysmith. When the inception of World War I evaporated finance and labour sources, construction ceased.

In 1919, chief engineer Johnson revisited the site. Most of the equipment was badly rusted or ruined. Exposure to the elements rendered one and a half tons of explosives unusable. Storms had damaged the road. Refinancing and rehabilitation during the late 1920s never led to production.

Before the war, other prospectors discovered a rich quartz vein containing gold on the southwest slopes. In 1923 a small cyanide mill was installed and production was believed to be five to ten tons per day. Mothballed, the mine was restored in 1932, but the absence of economical transportation prompted closure the next year.

Favourable assay reports over the years indicated the mountain could have developed into one of the largest mining areas on Vancouver Island. Small-scale mining continued into the 1960s. In the late 1950s and early 1960s, test drilling occurred on the summit, but no production eventuated.

== Recreation ==
The mountain is most easily accessed from Bedwell Lake, reached via the Bedwell Lake Trail. Access is also possible from Cream Lake, reached via the Price Creek Trail. The Price Creek Trail is overgrown and not recommended. Although little evidence of the earlier mining remains, the mountain is a popular destination for hikers and climbers who can visit the old mine sites while experiencing the natural rainforest.

== See also ==
- List of mountains in Canada
- List of mountains in Strathcona Provincial Park
