= Bidwell (surname) =

Bidwell is an English surname. Notable people with the surname include:

- Adonijah Bidwell (1716–1784), first minister of Housatonic Township No. 1
- Annie Bidwell (1839–1918), wife of John Bidwell
- Barnabas Bidwell (1763–1833), Canadian and US-American politician
- Belinda Bidwell (1936–2007), first female Speaker of the National Assembly of The Gambia
- Charles Bidwell (1932–2016), US-American professor of education
- Daniel D. Bidwell (1819–1864) US-American civic leader and Union Brigade commander
- Edward John Bidwell (1866–1941), former Bishop of Ontario
- Everett Bidwell (1899–1991), US-American politician
- George Bidwell (1832–1899), inventor, conman, forger, famously embezzled from the Bank of England, and authored his autobiography Forging His Chains
- George R. Bidwell (1858–1948), pioneering bicycle salesman, manufacturer, and politician
- Jake Bidwell (born 1993), English footballer
- Jared Bidwell (born 1987), Australian rower
- John Bidwell (1620–1687), founding member along with Thomas Hooker of Hartford, CT
- John Bidwell (1819–1900), US-American politician
- John Carne Bidwill (1815–1853), botanist and explorer in Australia, Canada & New Zealand
- Josh Bidwell (born 1976), US-American footballer
- Julie Bidwell (born 1973), Fox News anchor who also goes by Julie Banderas
- Luis Bolín-Bidwell (1897–1969), known as Luis Bolín, Spanish-English journalist and Francoist
- Marshall Spring Bidwell (1799–1872), lawyer and Canadian politician
- Mary Electa Bidwell (1881–1996), US-American supercentenarian
- Regent Alfred John Bidwell (1869–1918), an English architect best known for his work in colonial era Singapore
- Robin Leonard Bidwell (1929–1994), British orientalist and author
- Shelford Bidwell (1848–1909), English physicist and inventor
- Shelford Bidwell (historian) (1913–1996), English soldier and historian
- Syd Bidwell (1917–1997), former British Labour MP

Bidwell is also a given name. Notable people with the given name Bidwell include:

- Bidwell Adam (1894–1982), Mississippi lawyer and politician

== See also ==
- Bidwill (surname)
