= Bean harvester =

Bean harvesting machine

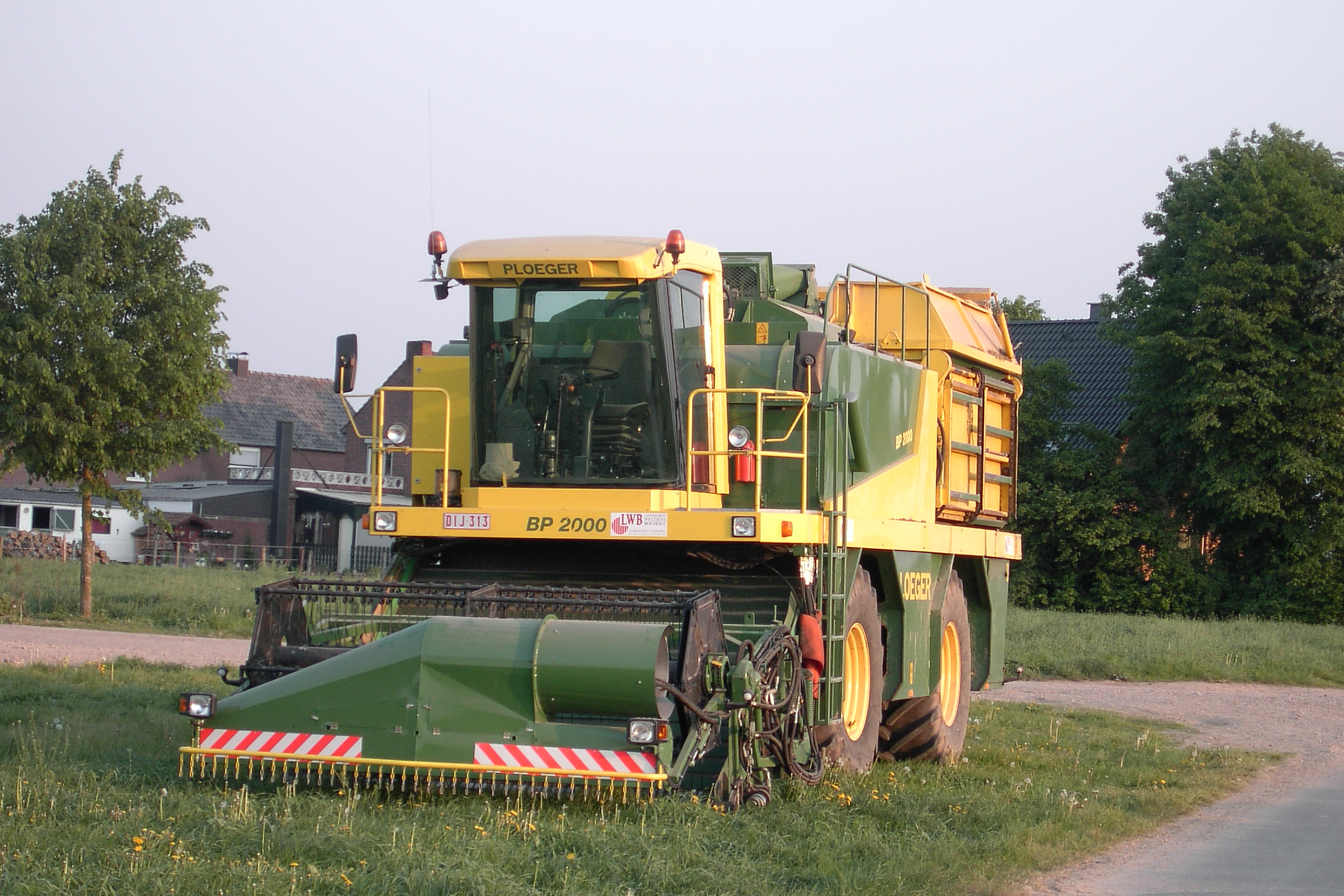
A Ploeger bean harvester, fitted with a spinach header.

A bean harvester, also known as a bean thresher or bean combine, is a threshing machine which is used to harvest beans. It mainly consists of a pickup, several beaters and shakers, elevators, conveyor belts, one or more fans, a storage bin, and a spreader at the rear. Until recently, the only practical manufacturer of bean harvesters was The Bidwell Bean Thresher Company, who have faced little to no competition due to their manufacturing being highly specialized.

== Process ==
The bean harvester lifts the beans off the ground, which are arranged into windrows by rakes and fed to a series of beaters and shakers, which separates the beans from their stalks. This is process is known as "winnowing". They are placed onto the main conveyor belt which feeds them into the first beater, spinning at a high RPM. This is where a significant portion of the threshing takes place. This process varies from machine to machine. Remaining stalk ("chaff") is used by some farmers bedding for pets and livestock, where it collects manure that can be later be used to Fertilize crops.

== See also ==
- The Bidwell Bean Thresher Company
