= Bidwill (surname) =

Bidwill is a surname. Notable people with the surname include:

- Arthur J. Bidwill (1903–1985), American politician
- Bill Bidwill (1931–2019), American businessman and sports franchise owner
- Charles Bidwill (1895–1947), American businessman, father of Bill Bidwill
- John Carne Bidwill (1815–1853), English botanist active in Australia and New Zealand
- Michael Bidwill (born 1964), American football executive, son of Bill Bidwill
- Violet Bidwill or Violet Bidwill Wolfner (1900–1962), American football owner, wife of Charles Bidwell

== See also ==
- Bidwell (surname)
