= Thomas Bedwell =

English mathematician and military engineer

Thomas Bedwell (died April 1595) was an English mathematician and military engineer.

Bedwell matriculated as a sizar of Trinity College, Cambridge in November 1562. He became a scholar in the same year; in 1566–7 he took the degree of B.A.; he was subsequently elected fellow; and in 1570 commenced M.A. He was appointed to the office of keeper of the ordnance stores in the Tower. He is said to have been the first to project 'the bringing of the waters of the Lea from Ware to London.' In conjunction with Frederico Genebelli he was employed as a military engineer in strengthening the works at Tilbury and Gravesend at the time of the Spanish Armada. He died in April 1595.

Thomas Bedwell was uncle of William Bedwell, the Arabic scholar, who speaks of him as 'our English Tycho.' The two are sometimes confounded, chiefly, it would appear, on account of an ambiguity on the title-page of the first of two works published by the nephew in explanation of a 'ruler' or mesolabium architectonicum which the uncle had devised to facilitate carpenters' calculations.
