= The Bidwell Bean Thresher Company =

Defunct agricultural machinery manufacturers of the United States

The Bidwell Bean Thresher Company was a manufacturer of bean threshing machines used to harvest edible beans. The company was founded by Charles H. Bidwell (born September 10, 1848) of Albion, New York, who, at the age of 10 had already made a small bean thresher. He eventually perfected and patented the design and manufactured, on a small scale, what proved to be the only practical bean thresher in existence at the time. In 1888 he moved from Albion to Medina, New York, where, in 1891, he named his business "The Bidwell Bean Thresher Company". He started the business with a capital stock of $20,000, the balance of which he purchased in 1893, making him the sole proprietor.

== See also ==
- Bean combine
