= Bedwell Sound =

Sound in British Columbia, Canada

Coordinates: 49°17′00″N 125°49′00″W

Bedwell Sound is a sound on the West Coast of Vancouver Island, British Columbia, Canada. It is located in the Clayoquot Sound region to the north of Meares Island and the resort community of Tofino. The Bedwell River, originally the Bear River and called Oinimitis in the Nuu-chah-nulth language, empties into and gets its current name from the Sound.

== Name origin ==
The sound was named by Captain Richards for Royal Navy Staff Commander Edward Parker Bedwell, second master aboard HMS Plumper, 1857–60. Master 1860, and appointed to HMS Hecate, 1861–62, which vessel relieved the Plumper of her surveying duties in December 1860 and which is the namesake of Hecate Strait. His eventual rank at retirement in 1870 was Staff Commander.

== See also ==
- Bedwell (disambiguation)
