= Bedwell River =

River in British Columbia, Canada

Coordinates: 49°22′00″N 125°46′00″W

The Bedwell River is in the Clayoquot Sound region on the west coast of Vancouver Island, British Columbia. The river flows into Bedwell Sound, which lies northeast of Meares Island and Tofino.

== Name origin ==
Formerly named the Bear River by Captain Richards, the official rename evidenced the Bedwell Sound connection. However, the previous name remains in use locally. The 1913 announcement that the name would change to Denbigh River, in honour of Rudolph Feilding, 9th Earl of Denbigh, chair of the Ptarmigan Mine on Big Interior Mountain, proved premature. Instead, Bedwell River was officially adopted federally months later, but a decade later provincially.

== First Nations ==
The indigenous name in the Nuu-chah-nulth language is Oinimitis, which is the namesake of the Oinimitis Trail. Oinimitis Indian Reserve No. 4 is near the mouth of the river.

== Mining ==
When prospectors discovered gold in 1865, placer mining quickly swamped the valley. However, the numerous large boulders made most workings unprofitable. Indignant at being duped, the hordes departed within weeks, leaving mainly Chinese miners, who maintained the constructed trail until the mid-1880s. Apparently, the sudden death of one of their number at that time created superstitious fears causing the final 15 to collectively leave.

In 1899, the townsite of Port Hughes was laid out at the river mouth, being the headquarters for 60 mines in the region. That year, a 14-room hotel was erected. Moses McGregor was the inaugural and final postmaster 1900–1901. The settlement was named after Capt. Hughes, who was master of a coastal steamboat. The residents soon left and the hotel closed. The location was uninhabited when the Ptarmigan Mine established a camp at the river mouth in 1913.

Where the valley forks in the upper reaches of the river, You Creek forms the right branch. Prospector Joe Drinkwater was the first to explore the creek, a later access route to several mining claims.

== See also ==
- List of rivers of British Columbia
