= Toby Graham =

British Army officer, cross-country Olympic skier and university professor

Dominick Graham
- Born: 24 July 1920; Yeovil, Somerset, England
- Died: 8 March 2013 (aged 92)

Academic background
- Education: Royal Military Academy, Woolwich; University of New Brunswick; University of London
- Thesis: British intervention in defence of the American Colonies 1748–1756 (1969)

Academic work
- Institutions: University of New Brunswick
- Main interests: British military history Second World War
- Military service
- Branch: Royal Artillery
- Service years: 1939–1958
- Rank: Major
- Service number: 106681
- Conflicts: Second World War: Norwegian campaign; Western Desert campaign; North-West Europe campaign of 1944–45
- Awards: Military Cross; Mentioned in despatches

Dominick Stuart "Toby" Graham, MC (24 July 1920 – 8 March 2013) was a British Army officer, cross-country Olympic skier and university professor. He is best known for his collaboration with British military historian Shelford Bidwell.

A wartime graduate of the Royal Military Academy, Woolwich, Graham served in the Royal Artillery during the Second World War. He was wounded twice, spent time as a prisoner of war in Italy, and was awarded the Military Cross in 1945. After the war he served with the British Army of the Rhine, and represented Great Britain in cross-country skiing at the 1956 Winter Olympics in Cortina d'Ampezzo, Italy.

After leaving the army in 1958, Graham moved to Canada, where he taught high school maths in Saint John, New Brunswick. He earned his Master's degree from the University of New Brunswick in 1965, and a Doctor of Philosophy from the University of London in 1969. He taught military history at the University of New Brunswick until his 1986 retirement, at which point he was named professor emeritus, and returned to England.

== Early life ==
Dominick Stuart Graham was born in Yeovil, England, on 24 July 1920, the son of Colonel Fergus Reginald Winsford Graham and Egeria Marion Spottiswood Baker. His father was a soldier who had served in Northern Ireland, the Middle East and China. His family nicknamed him "Toby" because when he was a baby they thought he looked like Toby the Dog in Punch and Judy. He was educated at Bradfield College, and entered the Royal Military Academy, Woolwich in January 1939.

== Military career ==
Graham's training was shortened by the outbreak of the Second World War. He graduated from Woolwich on 4 November 1939, and was commissioned as a second lieutenant in the Royal Artillery of the British Army. In 1940 he was sent to Narvik during the Norwegian campaign to command an anti-aircraft battery, and was wounded during an air raid. He was promoted to lieutenant on 4 May 1941.

In July 1942, Graham was serving as a Forward Observer (FOO) near Tobruk, Libya, during the Western Desert campaign, when his vehicle was hit, and he was taken prisoner by the Germans, and sent to a prisoner of war camp in Italy. His first escape attempt was through a sewer near Chieti, but was unsuccessful. He was then taken to a camp at Fontanellato, from which he again escaped. This time he made it as far as the railway station before he was recaptured. He was freed after the Armistice of Cassibile in September 1943, and made his way back to Allied lines through Italy, evading German patrols, and eventually reaching a village near Ortona, where he was discovered by a Canadian patrol.

Graham returned home to the School of Gunnery to bring his skills up to date, and then served in the North-West Europe campaign of 1944–45 as a battery commander in the Guards Armoured Division, reaching the temporary rank of major. On 16 February 1945, while serving as a FOO, he was again wounded during a German counterattack, but refused to be evacuated until the attack was repelled. For this he was mentioned in despatches on 22 March 1945, and awarded the Military Cross on 19 April 1945.

After the war Graham served as an instructor at the Royal Military Academy Sandhurst, and then as a staff officer with the 6th Armoured Division in the British Army of the Rhine (BAOR). He commanded the British Army's first missile-equipped artillery battery. He was promoted to the substantive rank of captain on 1 July 1946, and major on 4 November 1952. He married Valerie Mary Greig on 18 October 1947; they had two daughters, Anita Caroline and Patricia Robin. He retired from the British Army on 20 December 1958.

== Skiing career ==
Graham represented Great Britain in cross-country skiing at the 1956 Winter Olympics at Cortina d'Ampezzo in Italy, where he finished 29th of 33 competitors in the men's 50 kilometres.

== Academic career ==
After leaving the army, Graham moved to Canada, where he taught high school mathematics in Saint John, New Brunswick. He earned his master's degree from the University of New Brunswick in 1965, writing his master's thesis on "British intervention in defence of the American colonies, 1748–1756", and a Doctor of Philosophy from the University of London on the same topic in 1969.

Graham taught military history at the University of New Brunswick until 1986, when his marriage broke up and he decided to retire and return to England. He received the news of his appointment as emeritus while climbing K2 in the Himalayas. He married his childhood sweetheart, Mary Hawson in 1991, and they settled in Yorkshire, where he worked on her family estate and gardens. After she died he travelled by container ship to visit his daughter in New Zealand. The only other passenger aboard the ship was Ursula Behringer, and they were married in 2002.

Graham is best known for his collaboration with British military historian Shelford Bidwell, a fellow military historian and former Royal Artillery officer, whom he first met at a bar near Sandhurst after a seminar on the use of artillery on the Western Front of the First World War. The two had a long and close collaboration despite living on different sides of the Atlantic Ocean. Their first book, Fire-Power (1982) was about the development of artillery in the two world wars. Their second, Tug of War (1986), was about the Italian campaign during the Second World War. Finally, they wrote Coalitions, Politicians and Generals (1993), in which they wrote about the command and staff systems in the British, French and German armies in the two world wars. Graham also wrote an autobiography, The Escapes and Evasions of 'An Obstinate Bastard' (2000).

Graham died on 8 March 2013 at the age of 92.

== Bibliography ==
- Graham, Dominick (2000). The Escapes and Evasions of 'An Obstinate Bastard'. Bishop Wilton, York: Wilton 65. ISBN 978-0-947828-78-3. OCLC 270469842.
- Graham, Dominick (1999). Against Odds: Reflections on the Experiences of the British Army, 1914–45. Basingstoke: Macmillan. ISBN 978-0-333-66858-0. OCLC 316422030.
- Graham, Dominick (1993). The Price of Command: a Biography of General Guy Simonds. Toronto, Canada: Stoddart. ISBN 978-0-7737-2692-5. OCLC 612108017.
- Graham, Dominick; Bidwell, Shelford (1993). Coalitions, Politicians and Generals: Some Aspects of Command in Two World Wars. London: Brassey's. ISBN 978-1-85753-007-0. OCLC 612108017.
- Graham, Dominick; Bidwell, Shelford (1986). Tug of War : The battle for Italy, 1943-1945. London: Hodder & Stoughton. ISBN 978-0-340-34347-0. OCLC 611649675.
- Graham, Dominick; Bidwell, Shelford (1982). Fire-Power: the British Army Weapons & Theories of War 1904–1945. London: Allen & Unwin. ISBN 978-0-04-942176-9. OCLC 906429424.
- Graham, Dominick; Mason, David (1972). Cassino. London: First Pan/Ballantine. OCLC 602701450.
