= Shelford Bidwell (British Army officer) =

British army officer and military historian

- Born: 12 August 1913; Beckenham, Kent, England
- Died: 23 August 1996 (aged 83) Islington, London, England
- Branch: Royal Artillery
- Service years: 1933–1965
- Rank: Brigadier
- Service number: 56587
- Conflicts: Second World War: Tunisian campaign; Italian campaign
- Awards: Officer of the Order of the British Empire mentioned in despatches
- Other work: Editor of the Journal of the Royal United Service Institution

Reginald George Shelford "Ginger" Bidwell, OBE FRHistS (12 August 1913 – 23 August 1996) was a British Army officer and military historian.

A graduate of the Royal Military Academy, Woolwich, Bidwell served in the Royal Artillery during the Second World War, and saw action in the Western Desert campaign and the Italian campaign. After the war he served with the British Army of the Rhine. After leaving the army in 1965, he wrote books on military history, and was the editor of the Journal of the Royal United Service Institution from 1971 to 1976.

== Early life ==
Reginald George Shelford Bidwell was born in Beckenham, Kent, the son of Lieutenant Colonel Reginald Frank Bidwell, a British Indian Army officer, and his wife, Mabel Alice Graves née Petley. He had a younger brother who died in infancy, and a half-sister from his mother's first marriage, the poet and novelist Ida Affleck Graves. He was known as "Ginger" after his red hair. Much of his early life was spent in India, but his father was invalided out of the Indian Army in 1919, and the family returned to England. Bidwell was educated at Abbotsford, a preparatory school in Burgess Hill, Sussex, and then at Wellington School, Somerset from 1923 to 1931. He then entered the Royal Military Academy, Woolwich, from which he graduated near the top of his class in 1936.

== Military career ==
Bidwell was commissioned a second lieutenant in the Royal Artillery in September 1933. His first posting was India, where he served with the 18 (Talavera) Battery, 3rd Field Brigade. He was promoted to lieutenant on 31 August 1936. After the outbreak of the Second World War in September 1939, he returned to the UK, where he met and married Pauline Mary (Peggy) Le Couteur. They had two children, both daughters, Penelope Jane in 1941, and Georgina May in 1948. Bidwell served as the adjutant of the 141st Field Regiment (Dorsetshire Yeomanry). He was promoted to captain on 31 August 1941.

In the Tunisian campaign, Bidwell commanded a battery of the 74th Medium Regiment (Surrey and Sussex Yeomanry), for which he was mentioned in despatches. In June 1943 he became the brigade major (Royal Artillery) of the 2nd Army Group Royal Artillery, with which he participated in the landings at Salerno. He was a student at Staff College, Haifa, from March to May 1944, and then returned to Italy, where he served on the Royal Artillery staff of the 6th Armoured Division. In October 1944 he returned to Haifa as a member of the instructional staff there. In 1945 he was appointed second in command of the 1st Regiment Royal Horse Artillery, and transferred to the Royal Horse Artillery.

After the war, Bidwell was promoted to major on 31 August 1946. He served with the British Army of the Rhine (BAOR) as a battery commander in the 5th Regiment, Royal Horse Artillery, and as second in command of the 2nd Regiment, Royal Horse Artillery, at the War Office as a General Staff Officer (Grade 3), and at Headquarters, West Africa Command, where he helped prepare the defence forces of Ghana for independence. Promoted to lieutenant colonel on 2 November 1954, he commanded the BAOR's 58th Medium Regiment from 1956 to 1956.

Bidwell was made an Officer of the Order of the British Empire in the 1958 New Year Honours. As an instructor at the Royal School of Artillery, he wrote a handbook on the employment of tactical nuclear weapons. He was promoted to colonel on 1 January 1959, and brigadier on 1 January 1963. He commanded the artillery of the BAOR's 2nd Infantry Division. In 1964 he was posted to the Far East, where he commanded the North Malaya Sub-District and was Brigadier, Royal Artillery, Far East Land Forces headquarters in Singapore during the Indonesia–Malaysia confrontation. On returning to the UK in 1964, commanded the South West District. He retired on 1 January 1965. He was personal aide-de-camp to Queen Elizabeth II from 11 November 1966 to 12 August 1968.

== Historian ==
Long a reader of military history, Bidwell turned to writing his own books, informed by his own military experience, especially in the Second World War. None more so than his first book, Gunners at War (1970), in which he refuted the doctrine propounded by Sir Basil Liddell Hart and others that underestimated the importance of artillery and the need its fire to be concentrated. He followed it up with Modern Warfare: a Study of Men, Weapons and Theories (1973), in which he attacked Hart's indirect approach theory, arguing that wars cannot be won cheaply by small forces attacking around the periphery. More controversially, he argued that the UK should commit to continental Europe and its defence through the BAOR.

When Bidwell joined the Royal United Services Institute (RUSI) as the editor of the Journal of the Royal United Service Institution in 1971 it was a staid academic publication. Bidwell and the RUSI's director, Air Vice Marshal Stewart Menaul, overhauled it, introducing colour covers and illustrations. Bidwell subsequently became editor-in-chief and deputy director. Under their leadership, the RUSI became an important voice influencing the nation's strategic policy. In 1976 he retired as deputy director and editor-in-chief in order to concentrate on his book writing. He was a proponent of the advancement of women, and Jennifer Shaw was his chosen successor. He remained involved with RUSI as its vice president.

Bidwell collaborated with Toby Graham, a fellow military historian and former Royal Artillery officer, whom he first met at a bar near Sandhurst after a seminar on the use of artillery on the Western Front of the First World War. The two had a long and close collaboration despite living on different sides of the Atlantic Ocean. Their first book, Fire-Power (1982) was about the development of artillery in the two world wars. Their second, Tug of War (1986), was about the Italian campaign during the Second World War, in which they had both participated. Finally, they wrote Coalitions, Politicians and Generals (1993), in which they wrote about the command and staff systems in the British, French and German armies in the two world wars.

Bidwell died from cancer at Whittington Hospital, Islington, London, on 23 August 1996. He was survived by his daughters; his wife had died in 1994. His remains were cremated.

== Bibliography ==
- Bidwell, Shelford (1970). Gunners at War: A Tactical Study of the Royal Artillery in the Twentieth Century. London: Arms and Armours Press. OCLC 642966691.
- Bidwell, Shelford (1971). Swords for Hire: European Mercenaries in Eighteenth-Century India. London: J. Murray. OCLC 977460883.
- Bidwell, Shelford (1973). The Royal Horse Artillery. London: L. Cooper. OCLC 490821981.
- Bidwell, Shelford (1973). Modern Warfare: A Study of Men, Weapons and Theories. London: Allen Lane. ISBN 978-0-7139-0451-2.
- Bidwell, Shelford (1976). Artillery Tactics: 1939–1945. London: Almark. ISBN 978-0-85524-254-1.
- Bidwell, Shelford (1982). The Chindit War: The Campaign in Burma, 1944. Leicester: Ulverscroft. OCLC 671717699.
- Bidwell, Shelford (1977). The Women's Royal Army Corps. London: L. Cooper. ISBN 978-0-85052-099-6.
- Graham, Dominick; Bidwell, Shelford (1982). Fire-Power: the British Army Weapons & Theories of War 1904–1945. London: Allen & Unwin. ISBN 978-0-04-942176-9.
- Graham, Dominick; Bidwell, Shelford (1986). Tug of War : The battle for Italy, 1943–1945. London: Hodder & Stoughton. ISBN 978-0-340-34347-0.
- Graham, Dominick; Bidwell, Shelford (1993). Coalitions, Politicians and Generals: Some Aspects of Command in Two World Wars. London: Brassey's. ISBN 978-1-85753-007-0.
