= Richard Gambier-Parry =

- Born: 20 January 1894; Highnam Court, Highnam, Gloucestershire, England
- Died: 19 June 1965 (aged 71); Abbots Close, Milton Keynes Village, Buckinghamshire, England
- Relatives: Thomas Gambier-Parry; Sir Charles Hubert Hastings Parry; Major Ernest Gambier-Parry; Major General Michael Denman Gambier-Parry
- Military career
- Allegiance: United Kingdom
- Branch: British Army; Royal Air Force
- Rank: Brigadier
- Service number: 9669
- Units: Royal Welch Fusiliers 3rd Battalion; Royal Flying Corps; Royal Air Force; Secret Intelligence Service
- Commands: Director of Communications of the Secret Intelligence Service; Director of Communications of the Foreign Office
- Awards: CMG (1945); KCMG (1956)

Brigadier Sir Richard Gambier-Parry, KCMG (20 January 1894 – 19 June 1965) was a British military officer who served in both the army and the air force during World War I. He remained in military service post-war, but then entered into civilian life for more than a decade. In 1938, he was recruited by the head of the Secret Intelligence Service (also known as MI6). Gambier-Parry led the Communications Section (Section VIII) of the SIS during World War II, and assembled a clandestine wireless network that connected the United Kingdom with SIS agents in many countries, as well as helping to create the SIS resistance network in Britain. During the war, he was also recruited by the Director of British Naval Intelligence to serve as the radio consultant for Operation Tracer in Gibraltar. Post-war, he ran a network of secret listening stations.

== Early life ==
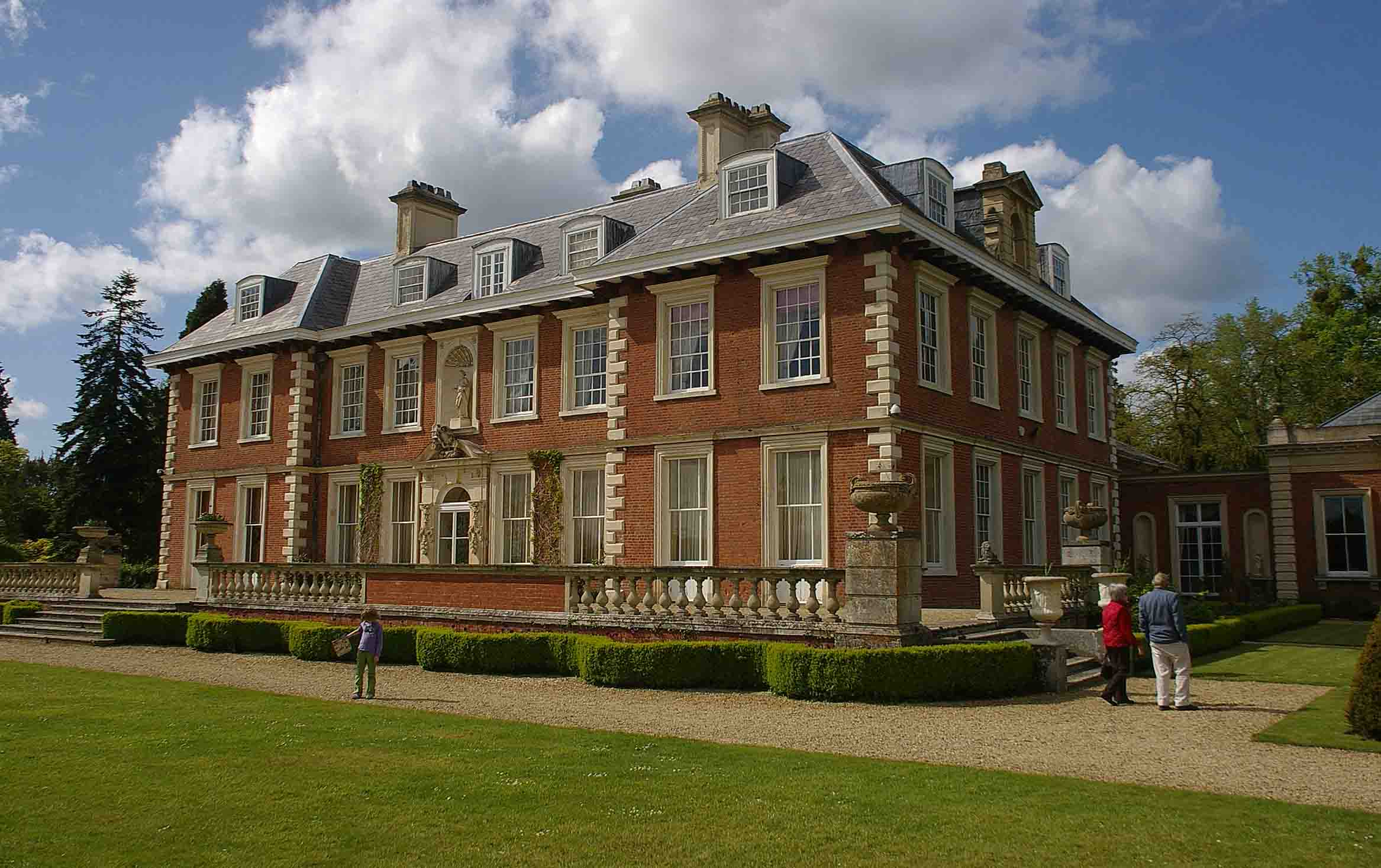
Highnam Court, Highnam, Gloucestershire

Richard Gambier-Parry, son of architect Sidney Gambier-Parry (1859 – 1948) and his wife Grace née Denman, was born on 20 January 1894 at Highnam Court (pictured at left), Highnam, Gloucestershire, England. He was the grandson of artist, art collector, and philanthropist Thomas Gambier-Parry (1816 – 1888). Other notable relatives included his uncles, composer Sir Charles Hubert Hastings Parry (1848 – 1918) and Major Ernest Gambier-Parry (1853 – 1936). His brother was Major General Michael Denman Gambier-Parry (1891 – 1976).

Following Gambier-Parry's education at Eton College, he spent some time in the United States. With the onset of the First World War, he joined the Royal Welsh Fusiliers. He was appointed to the 3rd Battalion of the Royal Welsh Fusiliers on 9 August 1914, and was commissioned as Second Lieutenant (on probation) on 15 August 1914. He was promoted from 2nd Lieutenant to Lieutenant on 20 March 1916, which was later antedated to 3 March 1916. He served with distinction in France and Belgium and was wounded on three occasions. Also mentioned in despatches twice, Gambier-Parry then joined the Royal Flying Corps. On 29 August 1918, he was granted a temporary commission as Lieutenant in the Royal Air Force, with seniority from 1 April 1918. On 1 May 1919, the Lieutenant was appointed Staff Officer, 3rd Class. Effective 1 August 1919, he was re-seconded for two years as a Flying Officer in the Royal Air Force. Effective 1 August 1921, the Lieutenant in the Royal Welch Fusiliers was re-seconded as a Flight Lieutenant in the Royal Air Force for a period of two years. On 1 August 1925, the Captain in the Royal Welch Fusiliers relinquished his temporary commission as Flight Lieutenant upon return to Army duty.

Gambier-Parry married widow Diana Williams Andrews née Norrington on 26 September 1919. He was employed with the British Broadcasting Corporation in its public relations department from 1926 to 1931. However, Gambier-Parry and his first wife divorced, and he married Phyllis Gomm on 7 November 1931. He became interested in radio and worked for radio manufacturer Philco.

== Second World War ==
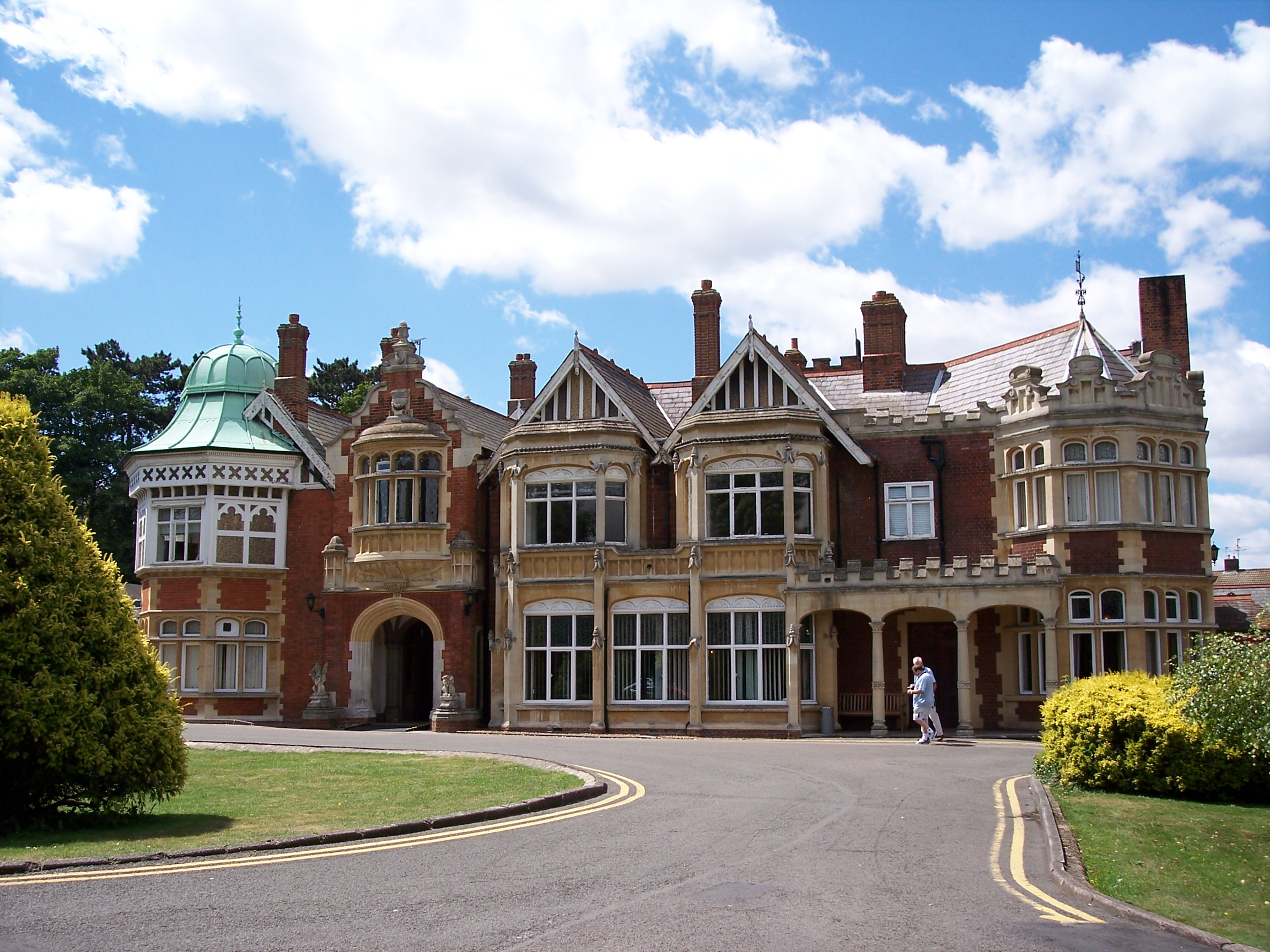
Bletchley Park

In April 1938, prior to the onset of the Second World War, Gambier-Parry was recruited by Admiral Sir Hugh Sinclair for the Secret Intelligence Service (SIS). Sinclair, previously the Director of British Naval Intelligence, had succeeded Sir Mansfield Smith-Cumming as head of the SIS, also known as MI6. The Radio Section was established in 1938 upon Gambier-Parry's appointment; he was to oversee a thorough modernisation of the radio capability of the Secret Intelligence Service. The Radio Section was combined in late 1938 or early 1939 with the Codes (or Cipher) Section to create the Communications Section, also referred to as Section VIII. As the head of Section VIII, Gambier-Parry, the Controller Special Communications (CSC), was charged with assembling a covert Wireless network that would connect the UK with their stations on the European Continent. He was promoted to Colonel in 1939.

Prior to Gambier-Parry's appointment to reform communications, SIS agents had depended upon coded telegrams relayed by cable. Before the onset of war in 1939, he attempted to establish the necessary communications facilities for the Secret Intelligence Service. One wireless facility was set up at Woldingham, Surrey, England. Covert transceivers were designed and built at MI6 workshops in Barnes, London. In addition, the Foreign Office agreed to have emergency transceivers, staffed by MI6 agents, sent to missions on the continent. However, Gambier-Parry's efforts were frustrated by the unwillingness of some heads of overseas missions to take them, based on the belief that their use was contrary to the Vienna Convention. The hesitance on the part of the Secret Intelligence Service to use radio communication resulted in a substantial lack of experience in clandestine wireless communication at the outbreak of war in 1939. Nonetheless, in 1940 he was one of the triumvirate of senior SIS officers who devised the British resistance network, linked by powerful wireless sets.

Whaddon Hall in Whaddon, Buckinghamshire was the headquarters of Section VIII, the Communications Section of MI6. The radio station which was originally located in the tower of the mansion of Bletchley Park (pictured), in Bletchley, Milton Keynes, Buckinghamshire, bore the name Station X. However, with a clearly visible aerial, it could not be kept secret. Instead, it was disassembled and relocated to Whaddon Hall. That facility served in a number of capacities, the most critical the sending of Ultra intelligence from Bletchley Park to officers in the field. The term Ultra was used to convey the status of the intelligence, which was considered to be above Top Secret. It consisted of information that was gathered by breaking encrypted radio communications. At the time that France fell to the Axis powers in June 1940, only a small number of SIS agents were in communication with Whaddon Hall. Early in the war, until about 1941, inexperienced SIS agents on the European continent spent too much time on the air, and jeopardised their security. However, by 1943, Gambier-Parry and his staff had engineered a substantial improvement in clandestine wireless communication. The covert wireless network that Gambier-Parry established allowed him to stay in communication with SIS agents in many countries. Historian Hugh Trevor-Roper served with the Radio Security Service (part of the Secret Intelligence Service after May 1941) and could not help liking the head of Section VIII. "In the world of neurotic policemen and timid placemen who rule the secret service, he moves like Falstaff, or some figure from Balzac, if not Rabelais."

== Involvement in Operation Tracer ==
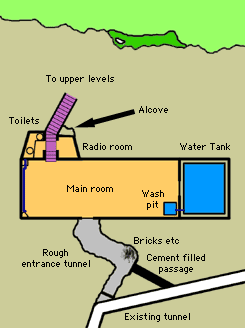
Map of Operation Tracer's Stay Behind Cave, lower level. North is to the left.

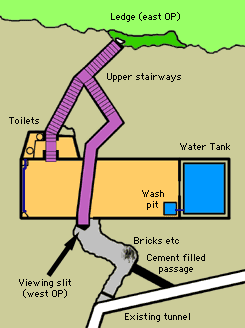
Map of Operation Tracer's Stay Behind Cave, upper level. North is to the left.

In 1941, Rear Admiral John Henry Godfrey, the Director of British Naval Intelligence, chose Colonel Gambier-Parry as his radio consultant for Operation Tracer, a highly classified, military operation in which a team sealed in a clandestine observation post was to monitor enemy vessels should Gibraltar fall to the Axis Powers. The team of six volunteers included three signalmen who would radio information back to the Admiralty. The covert complex (diagrams pictured left and right) was excavated in the existing tunnel system of Lord Airey's Shelter in the Rock of Gibraltar.

There were two observation apertures, one west over the Bay of Gibraltar, and the other east over the Mediterranean. A small radio room contained the equipment for wireless communications, which included a Mark 3 transmitter and an HRO Receiver. Three 12 volt, 120 ampere batteries were charged with one of two generators, one bicycle-propelled and the other hand-cranked. A rod aerial measuring 18 feet (5.5 m) in length extended up the staircase in a tube from the radio room and was inserted through the east observation aperture prior to transmission and was withdrawn when transmission was completed.

In January 1942, Gambier-Parry began trials of the radio communications for Operation Tracer, using equipment that he already had at Gibraltar, and sending one of his staff to conduct trials in the excavated radio room. By 30 April 1942, the three signalmen for the mission had been selected. Their training began in May 1942, during which the wireless communications in which they engaged remained undetected by the Radio Security Service. By August of that year, the full Operation Tracer team was in position in Gibraltar. However, a year later, in August 1943, the team was disbanded when the Director of Naval Intelligence decided that he did not need the operation to go into commission.

== Military honours and later life ==
In 1942, Richard Gambier-Parry received the rank of Brigadier. His appointment as Companion of the Most Distinguished Order of Saint Michael and Saint George (CMG) was announced in the 1945 New Year Honours. He ran a network of secret listening stations after the war, and was appointed Director of Communications at Hanslope Park, in the Borough of Milton Keynes. On 11 April 1947, he was granted the honorary rank of Brigadier in the Royal Welch Fusiliers. On 11 April 1949, Brigadier Gambier-Parry, with service number 9669, was appointed honorary Colonel in the Royal Corps of Signals. He retired in 1955. As Director of Communications of the Foreign Office he was knighted (KCMG) in the 1956 New Year Honours. Gambier-Parry and his wife had a home in Malta, where he founded a successful casino. In England, he was active in the community during his retirement, serving as president of the Bletchley Conservative Club and president of the Milton Keynes Cricket Club. In addition, he was a regular speaker at the yearly Bletchley Police dinner. Brigadier Sir Richard Gambier-Parry died on 19 June 1965 at Abbots Close, Milton Keynes Village.

In 1974, information about Bletchley Park started to become declassified and was made known to the British public.
