= Sidney Gambier-Parry =

British architect

- Born: 9 January 1859; Highnam Court, Highnam, Gloucestershire, England
- Died: 17 November 1948 (aged 89); Cirencester, Gloucestershire, England
- Education: Eton College; Gloucester School of Art
- Occupation: Architect

Sidney Gambier-Parry (9 January 1859 – 17 November 1948) was a British architect.

A native of Highnam, Gloucestershire, he came from a prominent family with a focus on military service and the arts. His career spanned more than five decades, with churches frequently among his commissions, particularly those in Gloucestershire.

== Background ==
Sidney Gambier-Parry, the son of Thomas Gambier-Parry and his second wife Ethelinda Lear, was born on 9 January 1859 at Highnam Court, Highnam, Gloucestershire. His father was an artist, philanthropist, and art collector. His brother Major Ernest Gambier-Parry was wounded in the Suakin Expedition of 1885. His half-brother was composer Sir Charles Hubert Hastings Parry.

Sidney Gambier-Parry was educated at Eton College. His education also included one year at the Gloucester School of Art. In addition, he was a student of Sir Arthur William Blomfield for three years, from 1878 to 1881. The architect Henry Woodyer was another influence on Gambier-Parry, who became an Associate of the Royal Institute of British Architects (ARIBA) on 23 May 1881. His brother Ernest dedicated his book, The Spirit of the Old Folk, to Sidney. "To my brother Sidney Gambier-Parry in recollection of the golden days when we trudged the fields together in fullest health and strength."

== Career ==
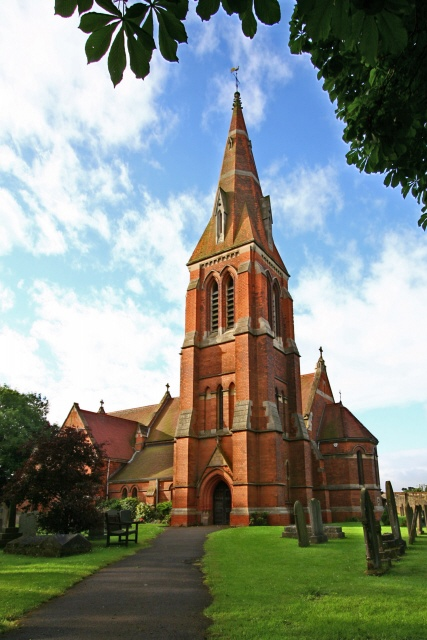
All Saints' Church, Winthorpe

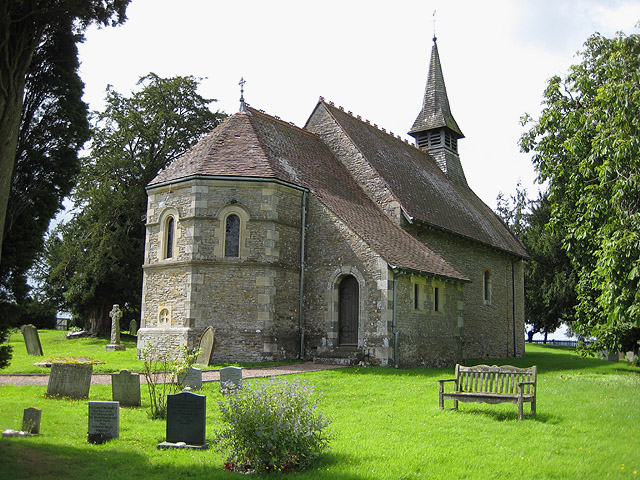
St Michael & All Angels, Bulley

Gambier-Parry was the architect of All Saints' Church, Winthorpe (pictured), which was rebuilt in 1886 to 1888 to replace the old building. The church was built on behalf of the Reverend Edward Handley, the rector of All Saints'. Gambier-Parry was also the architect of the restoration of St Michael and All Angels parish church at Bulley in the Gloucestershire, a Grade I listed building. Also referred to as St Michael & All Angels, Bulley (pictured), the church, aside from the nave walls, was rebuilt according to his design in 1886 and 1887. Changes included a new chancel, north vestry, timber-framed south porch, bell turret, and churchyard gates. Members of his family donated some of the new furnishings; Gambier-Parry supplied an oak lectern. About 1887, he designed a pair of cottages at Highnam Green in Highnam. In 1888 he built St Michael at Tidenham Chase, Gloucestershire, for Reverend Fielding Palmer. The Grade II listed St Peter's parish church (now St John Chrysostom Greek Orthodox Church) in Bentham, Badgeworth, Gloucestershire, was built in 1888 to his design. The churches of Bulley, Tidenham Chase, and Bentham are among those which demonstrate the influence of Woodyer.

Gambier-Parry designed the coped tomb of his father, which is positioned in the churchyard east of the chancel of the Church of the Holy Innocents. The monument to Thomas Gambier-Parry is Grade II listed. The architect also worked on the sanctuary and chancel arch of All Saints' Church on Oakleigh Road North in Friern Barnet, London. In 1889 he restored the Church of St Margaret in Bagendon, Gloucestershire, now Grade I listed. Improvements made to the Grade II* listed Church of St Mary in Bayford, Hertfordshire in 1890 were to his design. Gambier-Parry made design changes to the Grade II* listed Church of St James in Quedgeley, Gloucestershire about 1890, and later designed the Quedgeley War Memorial in the churchyard. The glass in the chancel east window of Elmore Church in Elmore, Gloucestershire, was dedicated to Sir William Vernon Guise and designed by Gambier-Parry in 1890. He also made improvements to Elmore Court in Elmore, Gloucestershire in the late 19th century. In 1894 to 1895, he restored and enlarged the Grade II* listed St James' Church in Cranham, Gloucestershire. In 1895 he made design changes to St Michael Church in Boulge, Suffolk, on behalf of the Holmes White family. Gambier-Parry was also responsible for the late 19th century alabaster-work in the sanctuary of the Lady Chapel of St Mary the Virgin, Bathwick. He was the architect of Whitemoor, opposite Amberley Church, in the western part of the parish of Minchinhampton, Gloucestershire. In 1908, Gambier-Parry designed the Grade II listed Iveson Manor in Ampney St Peter, Gloucestershire. About 1908, the first vicar of the Grade II* listed St Mary the Virgin, Bourne Street in London selected him to replace the reredos of the high altar. The architect installed an arch fabricated of dark wood and, above the arch, ornamentation in a sunburst design. He also built the organ case and loft for St Mary's Bourne Street, using an English baroque style, with pediments, scrollwork, and finials. The Grade II listed Pytte House of Clyst St George, Devon, was renovated and enlarged by Gambier-Parry in 1911. In the 1930s, he restored St Michael's Church (pictured) at Duntisbourne Rouse in Gloucestershire, at the same time living in the nearby old rectory. The church was Grade I listed in 1958.

== Family and later life ==
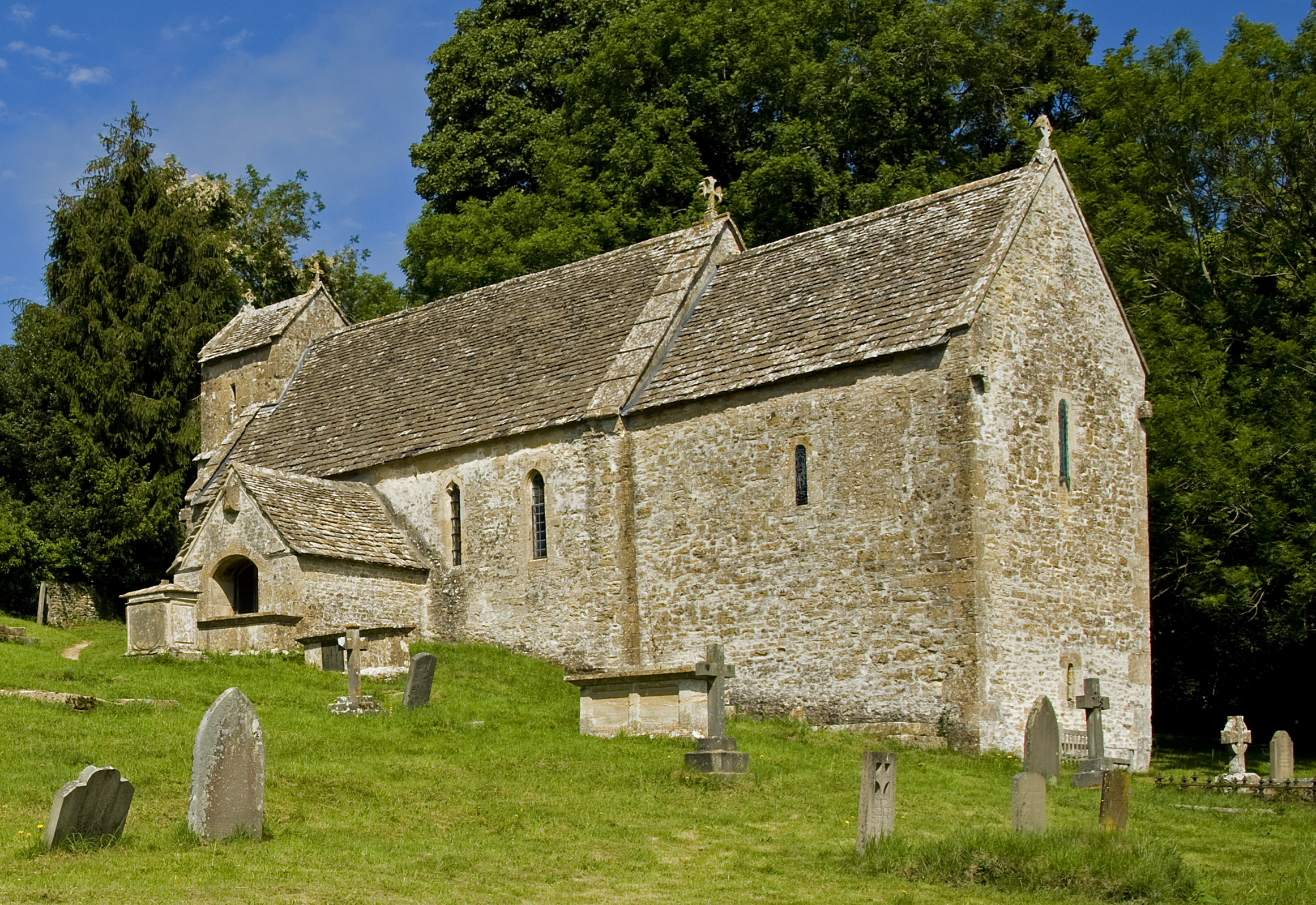
St Michael's Church, Duntisbourne Rouse

On 6 November 1890 Gambier-Parry married Grace Denman, daughter of the Honourable George Denman and his wife Charlotte née Hope. The ceremony was held at St Peter's in Cranley Gardens, London, and was performed by the Reverend William Henry Draper, with the assistance of the Vicar of Highnam, Reverend James George Tetley. They had three children: Michael Denman Gambier-Parry, Edith Joan Gambier-Parry, and Richard Gambier-Parry. At the turn of the century, the family resided in London, but had moved to Downham, Essex by 1911. Both sons had military careers. The elder, Michael, commanded the 2nd Armoured Division in North Africa in 1941 and became a prisoner of war. The younger, Richard, led the Communications Section (Section VIII) of the Secret Intelligence Service (MI6) during World War II and was the radio consultant for Operation Tracer. Sidney Gambier-Parry resigned from the Royal Institute of British Architects in 1924. He and his wife were living in the old rectory at Duntisbourne Rouse by the mid-1930s. Gambier-Parry was widowed on 16 April 1935. He died on 17 November 1948 in Cirencester, Gloucestershire.
