= Michael Gambier-Parry =

British Army general (1891–1976)

Major-General Michael Gambier-Parry MC DL
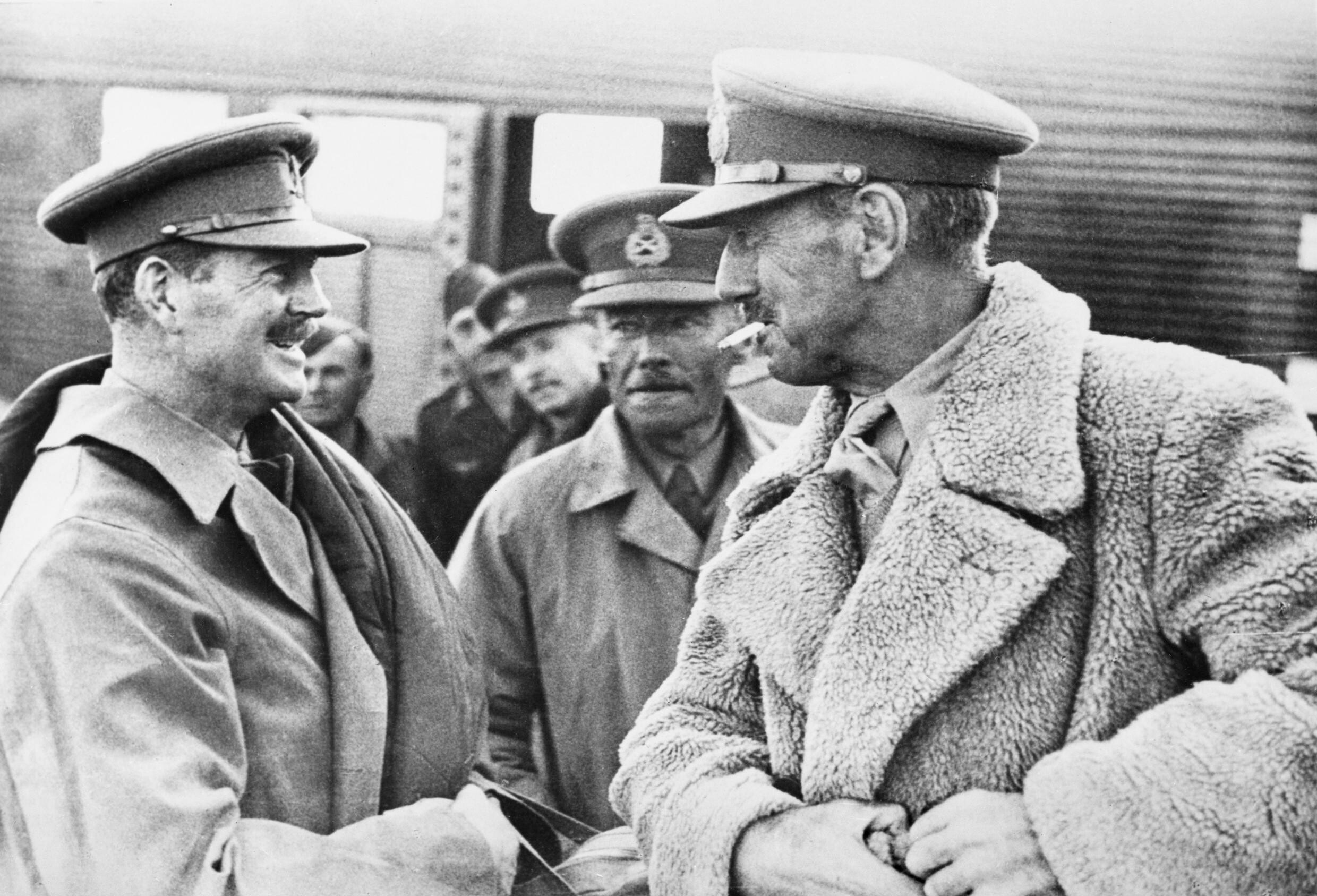
- Major-General Michael Gambier-Parry (right), Lieutenant-General Philip Neame (centre) and Brigadier John Combe (left), following their capture in North Africa.
- Born: 21 August 1891
- Died: 30 April 1967 (aged 75); Sussex, England
- Military career
- Allegiance: United Kingdom
- Branch: British Army
- Service years: 1911–1944
- Rank: Major-General
- Service number: 18187
- Units: Royal Welch Fusiliers; Royal Tank Regiment
- Commands: 2nd Armoured Division; 1st Malaya Infantry Brigade
- Conflicts: First World War; Second World War
- Awards: Military Cross; Mentioned in Despatches (6)

Major-General Michael Denman Gambier-Parry, MC, DL (21 August 1891 – 30 April 1976) was a senior British Army officer who briefly commanded the 2nd Armoured Division during the Western Desert campaign of the Second World War.

== Early life and family ==
The Gambier-Parrys of Highnam Court, Gloucestershire, were an artistic and military family (see Thomas Gambier Parry and the latter's son, eminent composer Sir Hubert Parry). His uncle Ernest Gambier-Parry was a major in the army sent to Egypt to avenge the death of General Gordon and wrote a book (Suakin, 1885) about his experiences. Michael's father was architect Sidney Gambier-Parry.

== Military career ==
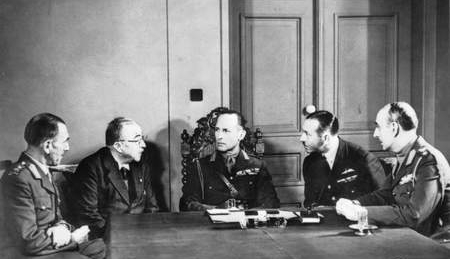
Meeting of the Anglo-Greek War Council in January 1941. Left to right: Major General M. D. Gambier-Parry, Dictator Ioannis Metaxas, King George II of Greece, Air Vice Marshal John D'Albiac and General Alexandros Papagos.

Educated at Eton College, Gambier-Parry entered the Royal Military College, Sandhurst and was commissioned into the Royal Welch Fusiliers in March 1911.

He served in the First World War in France, being awarded the Military Cross in 1916, and in the Gallipoli campaign and the Mesopotamian campaign. In November 1915 he was seconded from his regiment and succeeded Captain Alfred Reade Godwin-Austen as a staff captain.

After returning to Sandhurst and being placed in command of a Company of Gentleman Cadets, Gambier-Parry attended the Staff College, Camberley from 1923 to 1924 and transferred to the Royal Tank Corps in 1924. He relinquished the position of brigade major of the 7th Infantry Brigade in February 1929.

He then served as a General Staff Officer at the War Office before becoming commander of the Malaya Infantry Brigade in 1938.

Gambier-Parry served in the Second World War as Head of the British Military Mission to Greece in 1940, during the Greco-Italian War, and then as General Officer Commanding 2nd Armoured Division in North Africa before being taken as a prisoner of war in 1941.

Gambier-Parry was captured by the Italians along with Brigadier E. W. D. Vaughan at Mechili in April 1941. Arriving in Villa Orsini near Sulmona with Philip Neame, Richard O'Connor, John Combe and George Younghusband, he was sent to Castello de Vincigliata PG12 near Florence the same year. As Carton de Wiart wrote of him, "he was also a most gifted man, made delightful sketches, was a first class 'forger' – which could no doubt earn him a steady income in the underworld". Known as 'GP', he was a knowledgeable musician "and led the choir in our church services on Sunday". In September 1943 he escaped with the other officers and after various adventures arrived in Rome, where he had obtained sanctuary in a convent, until the Allies arrived; he retired in 1944.

== Postwar ==
In retirement Gambier-Parry lived at the Weavers House in Castle Combe near Chippenham and House Forest Gate in Poundgate near Crowborough and became Deputy Lieutenant of Wiltshire.

== Bibliography ==
- De Wiart, Carton (2007). Happy Odyssey. Pen & Sword Books. ISBN 978-1-84415-539-2.
- Fleming, Brian (2012). The Vatican Pimpernel: The World War II Exploits of the Monsignor Who Saved Over 6,500 Lives. Skyhorse. ISBN 978-1-61608-702-9.
- Foot, M. R. D.; Langley, J. M. (1979). MI9 Escape & Evasion 1939-45. The Bodley Head. ISBN 978-1-84954-131-2.
- Hargest, James (1945). Farewell Campo 12. London: Michael Joseph. OCLC 35249959.
- Neame, Philip (1947). Playing with Strife, The Autobiography of a Soldier, Lt-Gen. Sir Philip Neame, V.C., K.B.E., C.B., D.S.O. London: George G Harrap & Co. OCLC 906137043.
- Ranfurly, Hermione (1994). To War with Whitaker. William Heinemann. ISBN 978-0-434-00224-5.
- Smart, Nick (2005). Biographical Dictionary of British Generals of the Second World War. Barnsley: Pen & Sword. ISBN 978-1-84415-049-6.

Military offices
Preceded by Justice Tilly	GOC 2nd Armoured Division; February – April 1941	Post disbanded
