= Elegy for Brahms =

Music by Hubert Parry (1897)

The Elegy for Brahms is a short symphonic movement for orchestra, written by Hubert Parry in 1897. The Elegy is in the key of A minor, and is marked Maestoso espressivo – Largamente – Tempo primo. It was written shortly after the death of Johannes Brahms, whom Parry considered the greatest artist of the time. The work quotes Brahms's music in several places.

The Elegy was not performed in Parry's lifetime. Following his own death in October 1918, it was performed at a memorial concert for him at the Royal College of Music on 8 November 1918, conducted by Sir Charles Villiers Stanford, who had slightly revised the work. It did not receive its second performance until 1977.

It has received recordings conducted by Sir Adrian Boult and Matthias Bamert.
