= Ernest Gambier-Parry =

English painter

Major Ernest Gambier-Parry OBE
- Born: 25 October 1853; Highnam Court, Highnam, Gloucestershire, England
- Died: 15 April 1936 (aged 82); Highnam Court, Highnam, Gloucestershire, England
- Spouse: Evelyn Elizabeth Palk
- Relatives: Thomas Gambier Parry; Sir Charles Hubert Hastings Parry
- Military career
- Allegiance: United Kingdom
- Branch: British Army
- Rank: Major
- Units: Royal North Gloucester Militia; Royal Welch Fusiliers; Devon Yeomanry
- Conflicts: Suakin Expedition (1885)
- Awards: Officer of the Order of the British Empire (1918)
- Other work: Author, musician, artist

Major Ernest Gambier-Parry OBE (25 October 1853 – 15 April 1936) was a British military officer who participated in an expedition to the Sudan to avenge the grisly death of a renowned general in 1885. However, the wounds he sustained in that campaign ended his military career. Gambier-Parry was also known for his work as an author, musician, and artist. He succeeded to the manor at Highnam Court following the death of his half-brother Sir Hubert Parry. In addition, he preserved and archived the art collection that had been amassed by his father Thomas Gambier Parry; the masterpieces were eventually bequeathed to the Courtauld Institute of Art.

== Background ==
Ernest Gambier-Parry, son of Thomas Gambier-Parry and his second wife Ethelinda Lear, was born on 25 October 1853 at Highnam Court, Highnam, Gloucestershire. His father was an artist, philanthropist, and art collector. His half-brother was the composer Sir Hubert Parry, Thomas Gambier-Parry's son by his first wife Anna Maria Isabella Clinton. Another brother was the architect Sidney Gambier-Parry. His nephew Brigadier Sir Richard Gambier-Parry modernised communications at the Secret Intelligence Service (MI6) and was the communications consultant for Operation Tracer in Gibraltar during World War II. Ernest Gambier-Parry was educated at Eton, where he studied under William Evans, the drawing master at Eton, from 1866 to 1871.

== Career ==
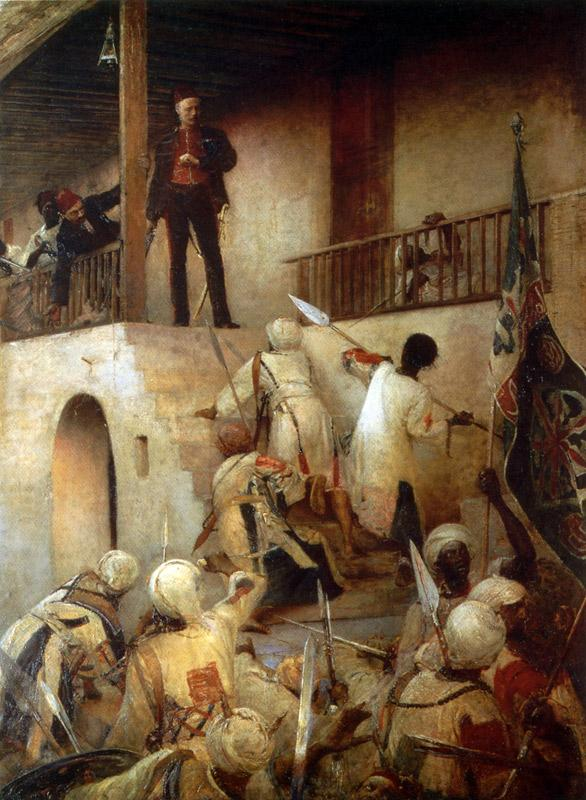
General Gordon's Last Stand

Gambier-Parry served in the Volunteers. By 1871, he had joined the Royal North Gloucestershire Regiment of Militia as a supernumerary lieutenant. He was promoted to lieutenant and, on 2 December 1874, he joined the Royal Welch Fusiliers (23rd Regiment of Foot) in that rank. Gambier-Parry became an instructor of musketry to the 2nd Battalion in 1880 and was at the Royal Citadel, Plymouth, in 1881. He resigned as instructor of musketry on 22 August 1881.

On 14 February 1883, he left the Royal Welch Fusiliers as a lieutenant, and joined the Devon Yeomanry, the Royal 1st Devon. On 12 February 1885, he was given the rank of captain in the army. Gambier-Parry participated as a special service officer in the Suakin Expedition of March 1885 commanded by Major-General Sir Gerald Graham VC, following the Siege of Khartoum, to avenge the murder of General Charles George Gordon in January 1885.

The moments before Gordon's death and beheading were portrayed in the painting General Gordon's Last Stand (pictured) by George William Joy.

The Suakin Expedition was also an attempt to change the course of the Mahdist War. During the Eastern Sudan campaign of March 1885, Captain Gambier-Parry was seriously wounded. That military campaign in the Sudan was the subject of his published work Suakin, 1885, which he penned during his convalescence. In the preface to that book, he requested "the indulgence of critics . . . on behalf of one who has carried a sword more often than a pen." He was appointed as a captain in the reserve of officers on 28 October 1885, and was subsequently promoted to the honorary rank of major on 7 May 1886 for his gallant conduct. He was invalided from the army and resigned his commission. During the First World War, he was commandant of No. 6 Red Cross Hospital in Oxfordshire, the Goring Auxiliary Hospital.

Gambier-Parry was appointed Officer of the Order of the British Empire in 1918. He was the president of the Gloucester Children's Hospital that had been established by his father. He was also a Gloucestershire magistrate.

Gambier-Parry had a strong interest in the arts. Not only was he an author; he was also a musician and artist. In addition to Suakin, 1885, Gambier-Parry was the author of Annals of an Eton House with some Notes on the Evans Family, Sketches of a Yachting Cruise, Day-dreams, The Pageant of my Day, Murphy: A Message to Dog-lovers, Allegories of the Land, The Spirit of the Old Folk, Life of Reynell Taylor, and Ainslie Gore: A Sketch from Life. He was a member of the Gloucester Committee of the Three Choirs Festival. He often exhibited his paintings at the Royal Academy and other venues. Gambier-Parry assumed the role of family archivist. He was reluctant to sell the collection of paintings and other art objects that his father had collected over his lifetime. (His younger son Mark similarly attempted to avoid the attention of dealers and instead bequeathed the Gambier-Parry collection intact to the Courtauld Institute of Art.)

The Gambier-Parry archive included an 1897 inventory of the estate that Ernest Gambier-Parry compiled and was used in the research of the collection for the Courtauld Institute. His inventory documented prominent members of the art world who were friends of his father and viewed the collection. They included two presidents of the Royal Academy: Sir Frederic Leighton and Sir Edward John Poynter. The former selected works from the collection in 1888 to show in the Royal Academy's Winter Exhibition. After his father's death, Gambier-Parry extended invitations to art experts to view the collection at Highnam. The visits occurred primarily in the 1910s and 1920s.

Gambier-Parry documented the visits and the impressions or detailed appraisals offered by the experts. The visitors included Professor Charles John Holmes, director of the National Gallery; Sir Claude Phillips, curator of the Wallace Collection; Roger Eliot Fry; Bernard Berenson; Dr. Raymond van Marle, author of The Development of the Italian Schools of Painting, William George Constable of the National Gallery, and historian Welbore St. Clair Baddeley.

== Family and later life ==
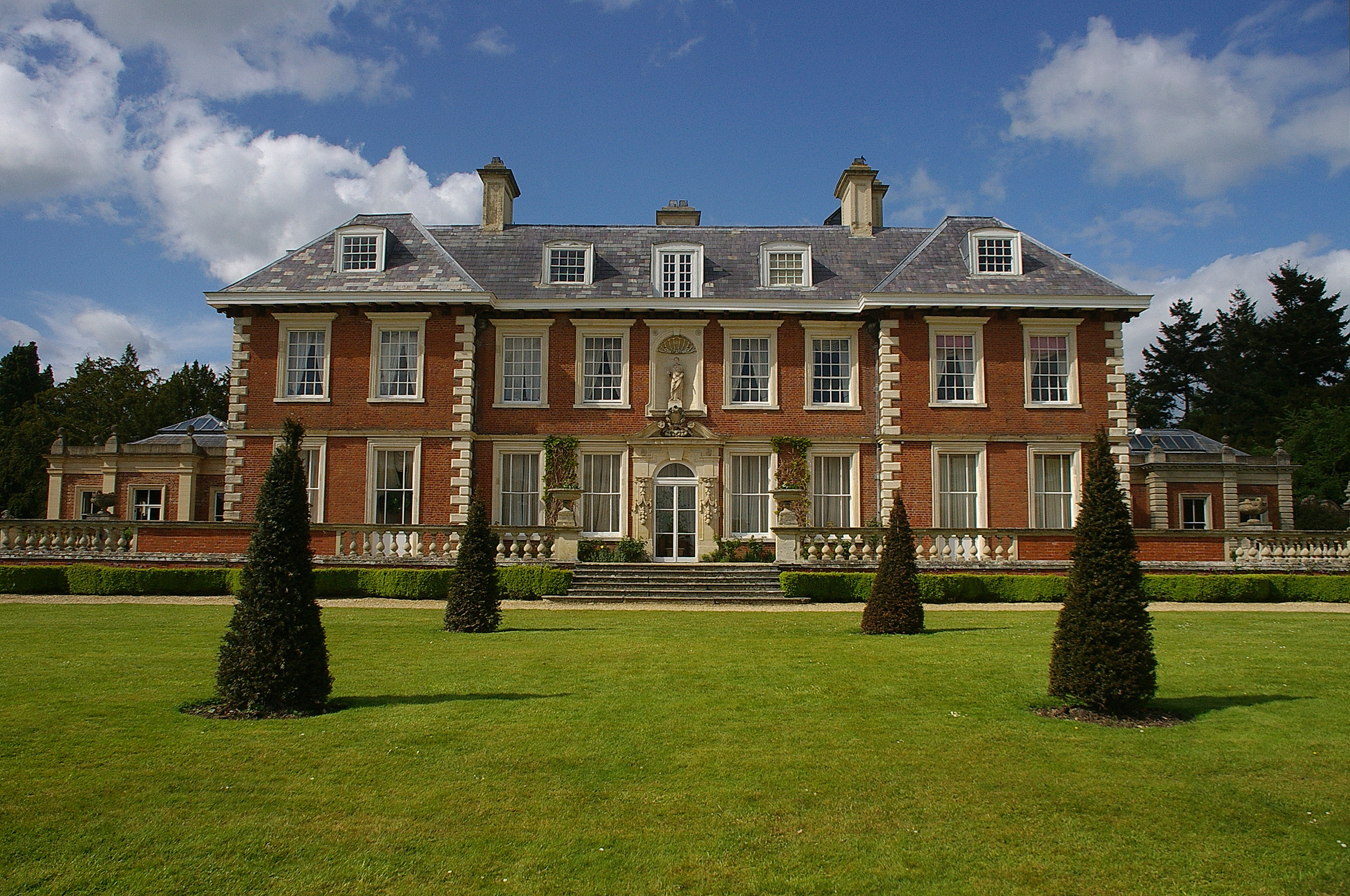
Highnam Court

Gambier-Parry married Evelyn Elizabeth Palk, daughter of Lawrence Palk, 1st Baron Haldon, in 1882. He resided with his wife and children in Goring-on-Thames in 1891, but had moved into Highnam Court (pictured) by 1894. Following the death of his mother Ethelinda Lear in 1896, his half-brother Hubert Parry inherited the Highnam Court estate. The two brothers disagreed over the management of Highnam Court, which was in grave financial difficulty. Ernest Gambier-Parry moved out and his brother moved into Highnam Court. The two brothers remained estranged for the rest of their lives. Gambier-Parry lived in Goring prior to Hubert Parry's death in 1918, at which time he succeeded him to the estate at Highnam Court.

Ernest Gambier-Parry and his wife had two children, although neither of their sons ever married. His elder son Thomas Robert Gambier-Parry was a botanist. He also became curator of the Department of Oriental Collections at the Bodleian Library at the University of Oxford. His son Robert died in February 1935; his wife Evelyn died that same year. Major Gambier-Parry died on 15 April 1936 at Highnam Court. His younger son, Thomas Mark Gambier-Parry, succeeded to the estate at Highnam Court; Mark resided there until his death on 9 August 1966.
