= Thomas Gambier Parry =

English artist (1816–1888)

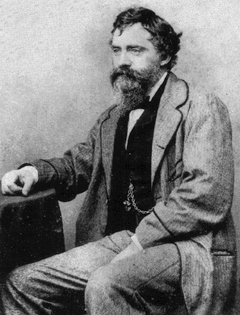
Thomas Gambier Parry

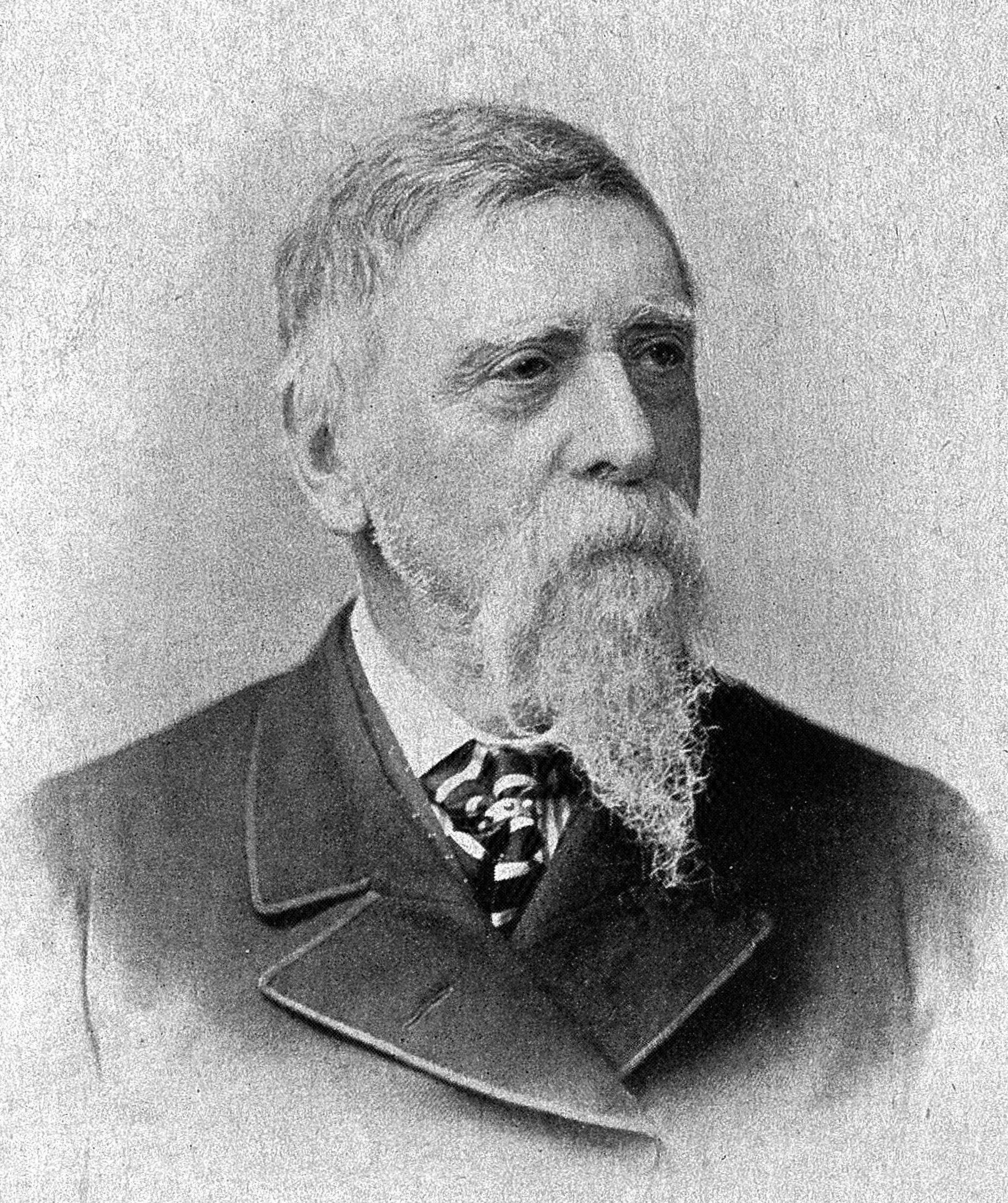
Thomas Gambier Parry

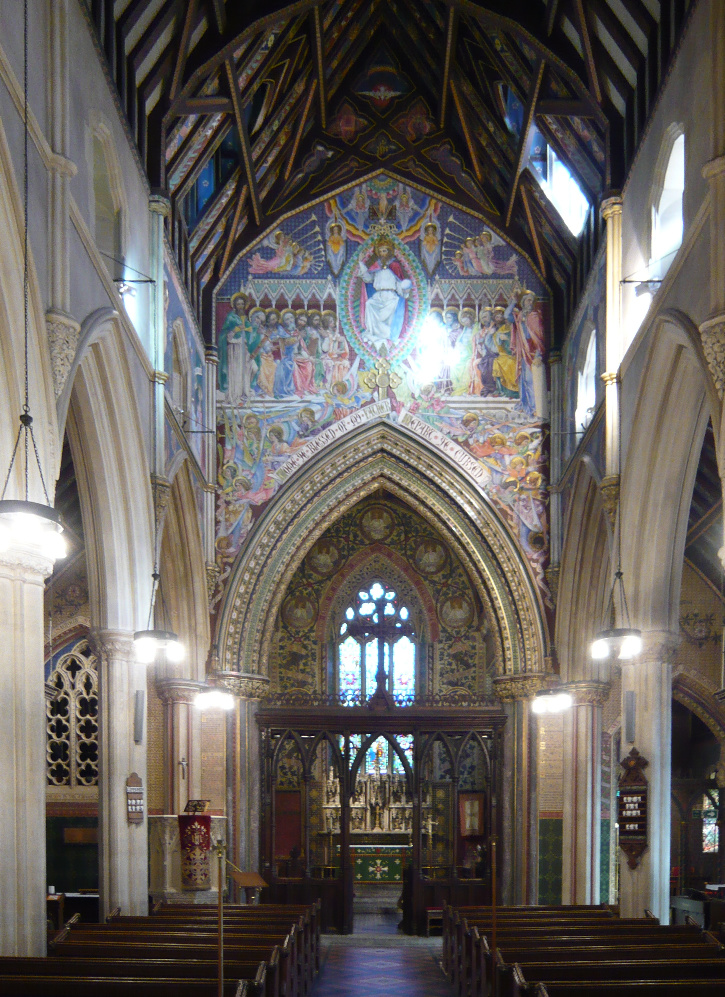
The interior of Highnam church

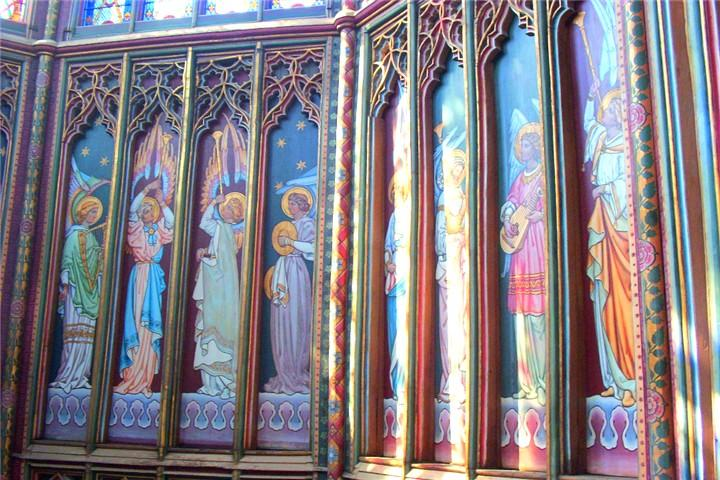
Angels inside the Octagon of Ely Cathedral

Thomas Gambier Parry, J.P., D.L., (22 February 1816 – 28 September 1888) was a British artist and art collector. He is best remembered for his development of the Gambier Parry process of fresco painting, and for forming the significant collection of early Italian paintings and objects that his heirs gave to the Courtauld Institute of Art in London, where many are displayed in the Courtauld Gallery.

Thomas Gambier Parry is the father of composer Hubert Parry.

== Life ==
Gambier Parry's parents, Richard and Mary Parry of Banstead, Surrey, died when he was young and he was raised by his maternal aunts and uncles, the Gambiers, among them James Gambier, 1st Baron Gambier. His grandparents were Admiral Samuel Gambier, 1752-1813 and Jane Mathew, 1759-.

He was educated at Eton and Trinity College, Cambridge. He moved to Highnam Court, Gloucestershire when he was 21 and, in 1839, he married, firstly, Anna Maria Isabella Fynes-Clinton, daughter of Henry Fynes Clinton. Only two of their six children survived to adulthood, Clinton Charles Parry and Charles Hubert Hastings Parry (the composer); Isabella survived the birth of Hubert in 1848 by only twelve days. In 1851, Gambier Parry married, secondly, Ethelinda Lear, daughter of Francis Lear, Dean of Salisbury, by whom he had six more children.

Thomas Gambier Parry's father and grandfather were both directors of the British East India Company, and Gambier Parry devoted his inherited wealth to good works. He adopted the principles of the Tractarian Movement, and was a prominent member of the Ecclesiological Society. Thomas Gambier Parry was a notable collector of medieval and Renaissance art; the Courtauld Institute was bequeathed his collection in 1966.

After studying the technique of the Italian fresco painters, Thomas Gambier Parry developed his own spirit fresco method and executed grand-scale mural projects at Ely Cathedral, Gloucester Cathedral and the parish church at Highnam.

He gained the reputation of a philanthropist, founding a children's hospital, orphanage, and college of science and art at Gloucester, and providing a church and school for his tenants at Highnam. He constructed the Church of the Holy Innocents, Highnam between 1849 and 1851 in memory of his first wife and those of his children who had died at early ages. Gambier-Parry adorned the whole of the chancel, including the roof, and much of the nave with frescoes using the new Gambier Parry process he adapted from his study of Italian fresco painters. He is buried there in a tomb designed by his son Sidney. He started to lay out the Highnam Court gardens in 1840 and was one of the first to make a pinetum; by 1874 the gardens rivalled any in the UK.

== Art collection ==
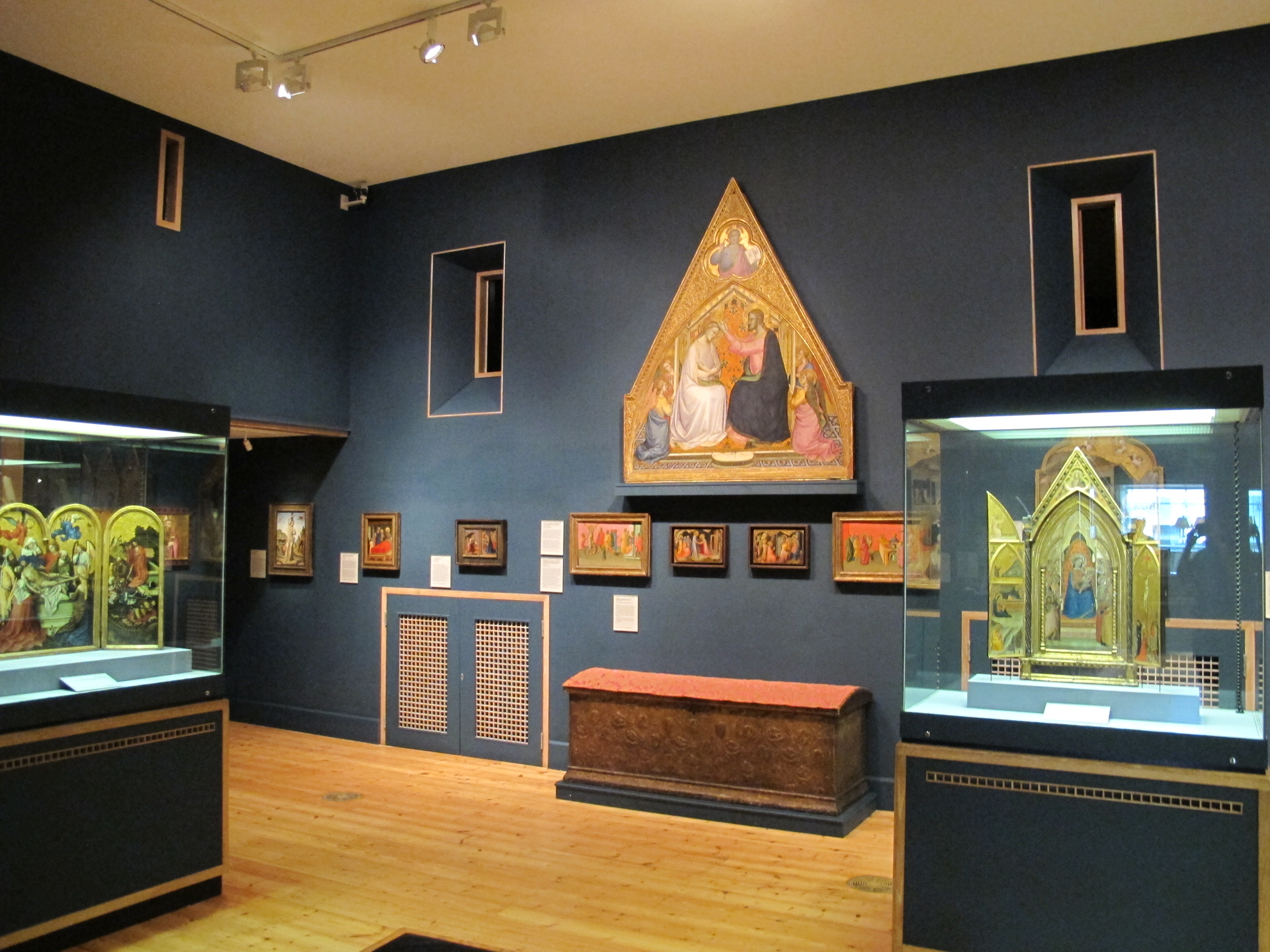
Most of the Gambier-Parry items on display at the Courtauld Gallery are in this room on the ground floor

Gambier Parry was a keen and versatile collector for most of his adult life. Many of his purchases were made on trips to the Continent, especially in Italy, but he also bought from dealers and auctions in England, and sometimes sold items. His most important collections were of late medieval and Early Renaissance paintings, small sculpted reliefs, ivories, and maiolica, but he also had a significant early collection of Islamic metalwork, and a variety of other types of objects, for example Hispano-Moresque ware, glass and three small post-Byzantine wooden crosses from Mount Athos, elaborately carved with miniature scenes. The Courtauld Gallery website shows images and descriptions of 324 objects from the 1966 bequest, which included the bulk of the collection.

Some items, including two Van Dyck portraits and The Gamblers by the Le Nain Brothers, as well as a collection of stoneware ceramics, were excluded from the bequest and remained at Highnam. Earlier a few important items, mainly medieval ivories, had been sold to pay death duties on the deaths of Thomas' sons Hubert and Ernest (see below). The most significant of these are three ivories in the Victoria and Albert Museum (who also have four 16th-century Limoges enamels sold in 1871) and a chasse reliquary that reached the National Gallery of Art in Washington via the Widener collection. All the objects mentioned below are included in the Courtauld bequest.

Gambier Parry began by collecting mostly 16th- and 17th-century works, but his focus gradually moved to 14th- and 15th-century works, still relatively little collected, although Prince Albert was among British collectors of "Italian Primitives", as Trecento paintings were then known. Among his most important paintings were a Coronation of the Virgin by Lorenzo Monaco, one of the larger works in the collection, three predella panels with roundels of Christ and saints by Fra Angelico, and a small but important diptych of the Annunciation by Pesellino. There are two further predella panels by Lorenzo Monaco, and many other small panels by lesser-known masters. Later Renaissance works include ones by Il Garofalo and Sassoferrato, and there is a Baroque Assumption by Francesco Solimena. There are a number of illuminated manuscript pages from the workshop of the Boucicaut Master.

The sculptures include three fine 15th-century marble reliefs of the Virgin and Child, the most significant of them one by Mino da Fiesole. There is a Limoges enamel book cover panel, a number of Renaissance Limoges items, and several small Gothic ivories.

== Descendants ==
=== Sons ===
Sir Charles Hubert Hastings Parry, 1st Baronet (1848–1918) was a leading English composer, teacher and historian of music. As a composer he is best known for the choral song "Jerusalem", the coronation anthem "I was glad", the choral and orchestral ode Blest Pair of Sirens, and the hymn tune "Repton", which sets the words "Dear Lord and Father of Mankind". His orchestral works include five symphonies and a set of Symphonic Variations. He was head of the Royal College of Music, and concurrently professor of music at the University of Oxford from 1900 to 1908.

On the death of Hubert Parry in 1918, his half-brother Ernest Gambier-Parry (1853–1936) succeeded to the family estate at Highnam. Major Gambier-Parry, in addition to his military service, was an artist, author, and musician. He was at Eton from 1866 to 1871, and served in the Volunteers and Militia, The Royal Welch Fusiliers from 1874 and the Devon Yeomanry 10 years later. In the Eastern Sudan Expedition of 1885 as a special service officer, he was seriously injured and was promoted major for services in the field. For services in World War One, when he was commandant of No. 6 Red Cross Hospital, Oxfordshire, he was made an O.B.E. in 1918. He was a frequent exhibitor at the Royal Academy and other exhibitions, and served on the Gloucester Committee of the Three Choirs Festival. He married in 1882, Evelyn Elizabeth, R.R.C., daughter of the first Lord Haldon.

Sidney Gambier-Parry (9 January 1859 – 17 November 1948) was another son of Thomas' second marriage, and an architect, especially of churches.

== Notes ==
Honorary titles
Preceded by William Philip Price	High Sheriff of Gloucestershire; 1850	Succeeded by William Dent
