= Oakridge, Tewkesbury =

Area of Highnam, Gloucestershire, England

Coordinates: 51.879°N 02.2910°W

Oakridge
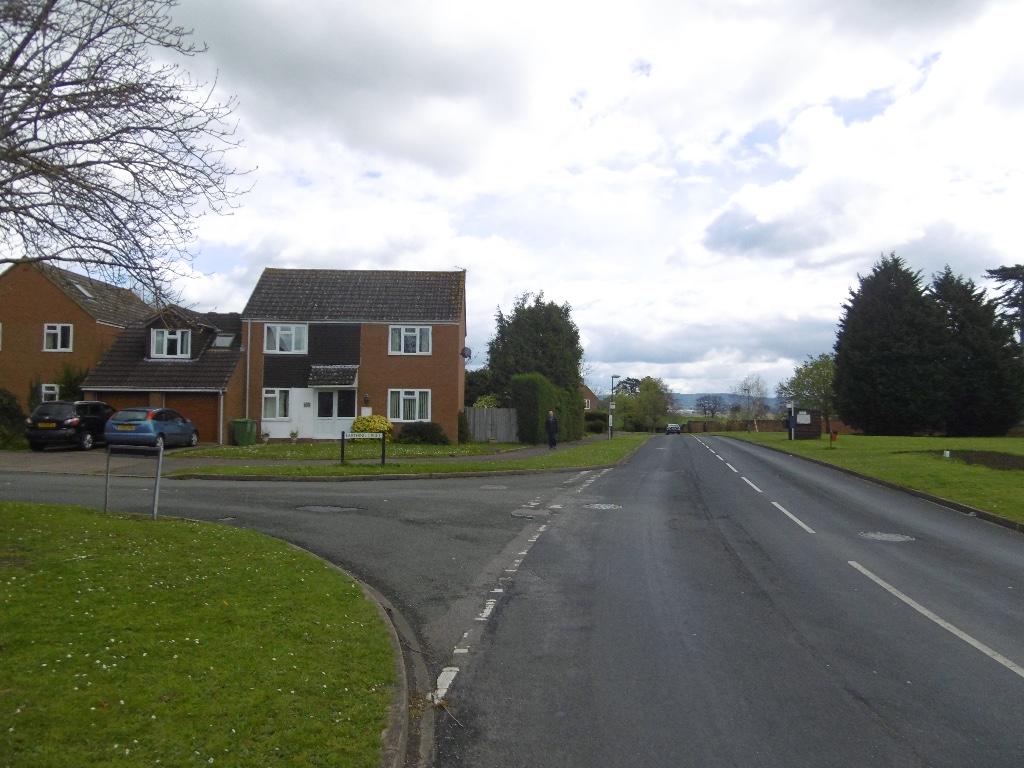
- Oakridge Road

- Location within Gloucestershire
- Civil parish: Highnam
- District: Tewkesbury
- Shire county: Gloucestershire
- Region: South West
- Country: England
- Sovereign state: United Kingdom
- Police: Gloucestershire
- Fire: Gloucestershire
- Ambulance: South Western

Oakridge is an area of Highnam in the Tewkesbury district, in Gloucestershire, England.
