= Blest Pair of Sirens =

Choral composition by Hubert Parry

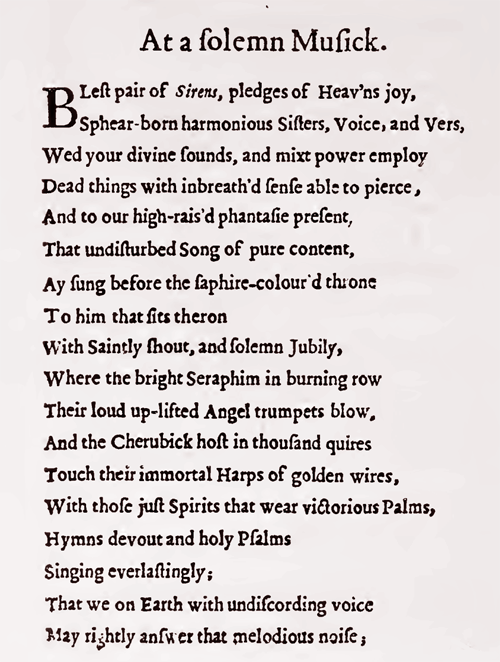
1645 edition of Milton's ode, set by Parry

Blest Pair of Sirens is a work for choir and orchestra by the English composer Hubert Parry, setting John Milton's ode At a solemn Musick. It was first performed at St James's Hall, London on 17 May 1887, conducted by its dedicatee, Charles Villiers Stanford. The piece is about 11 minutes in duration.

== Background ==
In the mid 1880s, Parry was struggling to establish himself as a composer. In 1886, he was disappointed when his one attempt at opera, Guenever, was rejected by the impresario Carl Rosa. Shortly after that setback, Parry was commissioned by Charles Villiers Stanford to compose a piece for the Bach Choir of London, of which Parry was a member. Stanford, one of the first British musicians to recognise Parry's talent, called him the greatest English composer since Purcell.

Stanford had originally intended to perform an existing work of Parry's, the 1885 cantata The Glories of our Blood and State. As the concert was to mark the Golden Jubilee of Queen Victoria, it was thought that such lines in the text as "Sceptre and crown must tumble down" made the work unsuitable for the occasion. Asked to write a new piece, Parry turned, at the suggestion of his colleague George Grove, to Milton's ode, which he had been considering setting for many years.

The main item in the concert was the first London performance of Hector Berlioz's Te Deum (1849), dedicated to the queen's late husband, Albert, Prince Consort. Berlioz's work is on an enormous scale, and would have overshadowed any companion piece other than one of the highest quality. Reviewing the concert, The Times said of Blest Pair of Sirens:

The choral writing is in eight parts and abounds in contrapuntal devices. At the same time the spirit and the accent of the words are carefully attended to, as befits a work in which "sphere-born harmonious sisters, voice and verse" are invoked to "wed their divine sounds, and mix'd power employ". An excellent rendering contributed to the brilliant success of the ode.

The work was an immediate success, and was quickly taken up by other choirs. The following year it was given alongside Sullivan's The Golden Legend at the Three Choirs Festival. Recognised as "one of the outstanding English choral works", the work has remained a standard in the choral repertory. Among its higher-profile performances in the 21st century were those by BBC forces at the Last Night of the Proms in September 2010, (Note: The BBC web page on this event mentions in passing the nickname given to the piece by British musicians: "Best Pair of Nylons".) and by the choirs of Westminster Abbey and the Chapel Royal at the wedding of the Duke and Duchess of Cambridge in April 2011.

== Text ==
Parry set Milton's ode unchanged, except for modernising the poet's 17th-century spelling.

Blest pair of Sirens, pledges of Heav'n's joy,
Sphere-born harmonious sisters, Voice and Verse,
Wed your divine sounds, and mixed pow'r employ,
Dead things with inbreathed sense able to pierce;
And to our high-raised phantasy present
That undisturbed song of pure content,
Aye sung before the sapphire-coloured throne
To Him that sits thereon,
With saintly shout, and solemn jubilee,
Where the bright Seraphim in burning row
Their loud uplifted angel-trumpets blow,
And the Cherubic host in thousand quires
Touch their immortal harps of golden wires,
With those just Spirits that wear victorious palms,
Hymns devout and holy psalms
Singing everlastingly:
That we on earth with undiscording voice
May rightly answer that melodious noise;
As once we did, till disproportioned sin
Jarred against nature's chime, and with harsh din
Broke the fair music that all creatures made
To their great Lord, whose love their motion swayed
In perfect diapason, whilst they stood
In first obedience, and their state of good.
O may we soon again renew that song,
And keep in tune with Heav'n, till God ere long
To His celestial concert us unite,
To live with Him, and sing in endless morn of light.

== Notes and references ==
Notes

== Sources ==
- Allis, Michael (2002). Parry's Creative Process. Aldershot, Hants; Burlington, VT: Ashgate. ISBN 1840146818.
