= Highnam Woods =

Nature reserve in Gloucestershire, England

Coordinates: 51°52′20″N 2°19′25″W

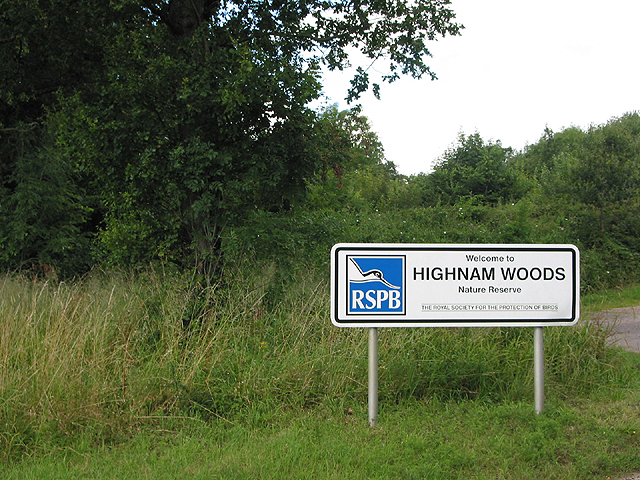
Entrance to Highnam Woods Nature Reserve

Highnam Wood is a nature reserve located in Gloucestershire and established by the RSPB to protect bird species in the region. A two-kilometre nature trail passes through the park, giving tourists a view of Britain's rarest breeding woodpecker species, the Lesser Spotted Woodpecker. Marsh Tit, Nightingale, Song Thrush, and Spotted Flycatchers also frequent the park.

== Forest Management ==
The RSPB periodically removes non-native species from the park to allow native species to grow and flourish. The association also thins out standard trees, while maintaining scrub and coppice species as habitats for Nightingales. Regularly, the RSPB rotavates the land to provide disturbed ground for upright spurge. They eventually hope to have 2,000 of the rare flowers living in the park. 20 hectares of the forest are left with minimal intervention by the society. Dead and decaying timber are also left untouched on the forest floor for insects.

== Opening of the reserve ==
The reserve is open to pedestrians at all times, and the car park is open through the spring and summer at weekends 10am - 4pm
