= Highnam =

Village in Gloucestershire, England

Coordinates: 51.874°N 02.298°W

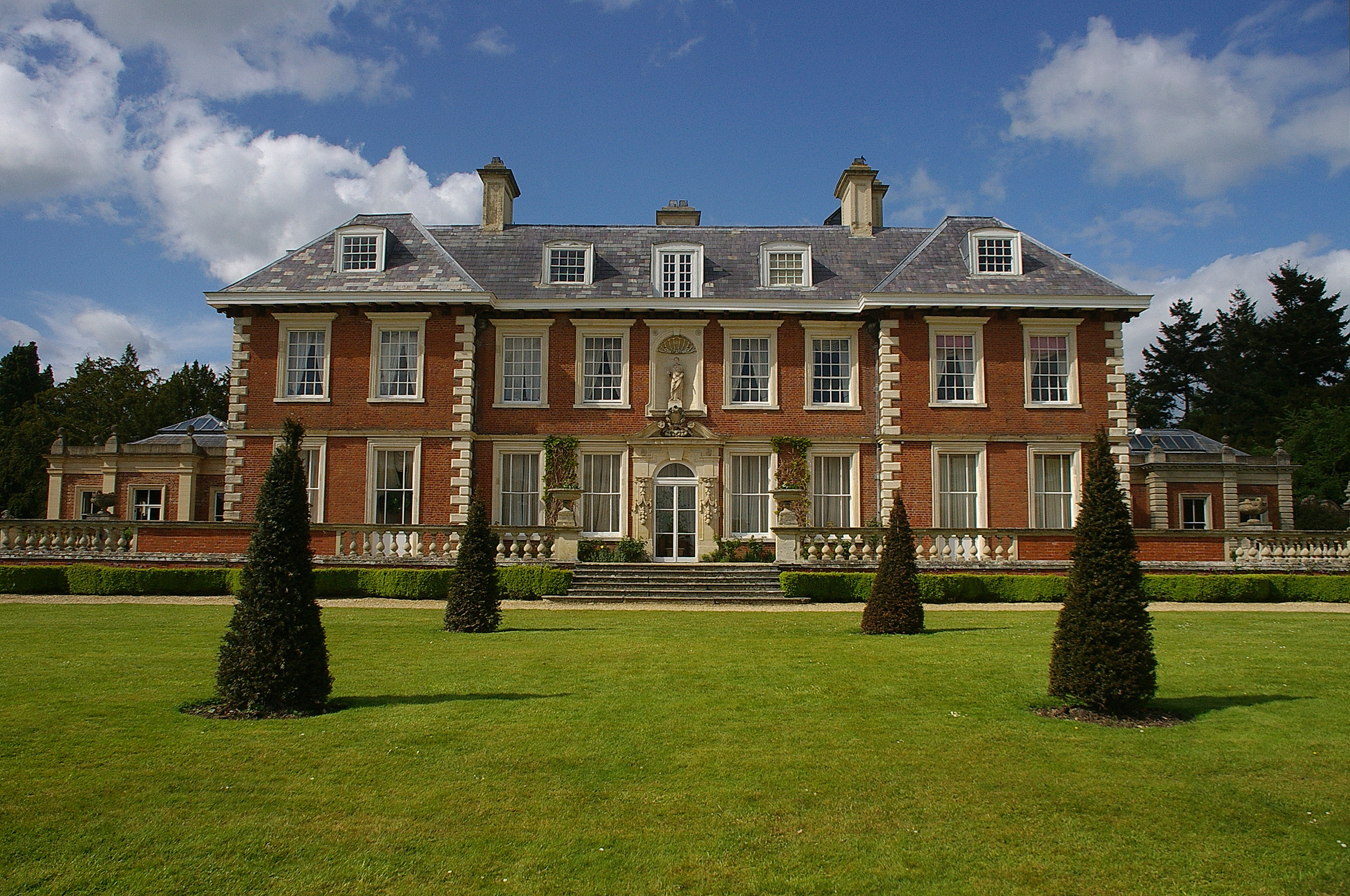
- Highnam Court

- Location within Gloucestershire
- Population: 1,936
- OS grid reference: SO795195
- District: Tewkesbury
- Shire county: Gloucestershire
- Region: South West
- Country: England
- Sovereign state: United Kingdom
- Post town: GLOUCESTER
- Postcode district: GL2
- Dialling code: 01452
- Police: Gloucestershire
- Fire: Gloucestershire
- Ambulance: South Western
- UK Parliament: Tewkesbury

Highnam is a village and civil parish in the Borough of Tewkesbury, Gloucestershire, England, three miles (4.8 km) northwest of Gloucester. It lies just off the A40 towards Ross, west of Alney Island and Over Bridge. It is connected by segregated cycle paths via Over Bridge and Alney Island to Gloucester. The parish includes the villages of Lassington and Over. In the 2001 census the parish had a population of 2,014, reducing to 1,916 at the 2011 census. At the 2021 census it had increased to 2,141.

Highnam was originally made up of farm land, which explains some of its street names (Brimsome Meadow, Poppy Field, Stoney Field, Long Field, Peters Field, Williams Orchard, et al.). As a village, Highnam is fairly small, containing few social amenities. These include the Church of the Holy Innocents, a school (Highnam C of E Primary), a village hall, a day nursery, a village shop and a doctor's surgery.

The Arnold family were Lords of the Manor in the sixteenth century- the best known member of the family is Sir Nicholas Arnold (died 1580), Lord Deputy of Ireland.

The wealthy artist and collector Thomas Gambier Parry purchased the Highnam Court estate in 1837. He remodelled the Court and laid out the Highnam Court gardens; he was one of the first to make a pinetum. Highnam Court gardens are now open to the public. His son, the composer Hubert Parry, learnt to play the organ in the church.

Highnam has an eighteen-hole golf course and a large business park just outside the main village. The village is home to both football and cricket teams, Highnam Court Cricket Club, and also has Beavers, Cubs, Scouts and Brownies groups. A new feature in 2007 was the addition of a Youth Café.

Highnam Woods to the west of the village are managed by the RSPB as a nature reserve, and Lassington Wood is to the east of the village.

== Holy Innocents Church ==
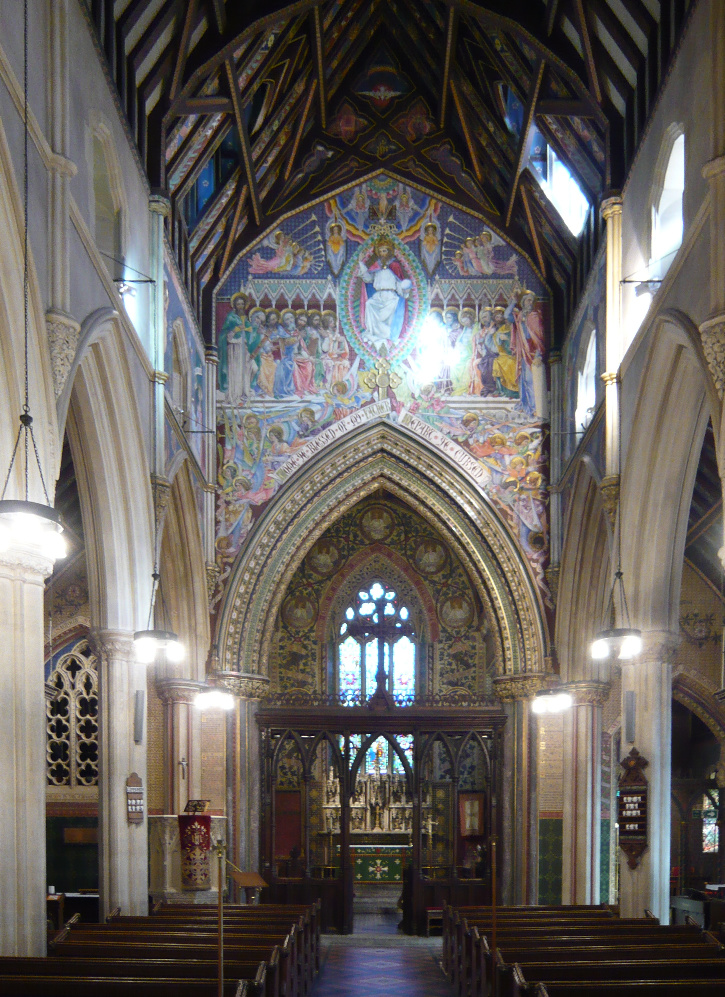
The interior of Highnam church

The church of the Holy Innocents, Highnam was constructed between 1849 and 1851 at the request of Thomas Gambier Parry in memory of his first wife and those of his children who died at an early age. The church was designed by Henry Woodyer in a Gothic style.

Gambier-Parry adorned the whole of the chancel, including the roof, and much of the nave with frescoes using a new "spirit fresco" method he adapted from his study of Italian fresco painters. The church has been described by Sir John Betjeman as "The most complete Victorian Church in this country". In Simon Jenkins' book England's Thousand Best Churches, Holy Innocents was rated in the "Top 100" with four stars.

A major restoration of the church and frescoes was completed in 1994. The Grade I listed church forms an ensemble with its listed Church Lodge, Rectory, Memorial Hall and Old Schoolhouse on the edge of the park of Highnam Court.

Although unringable, the tower contains the world's heaviest ring of three bells, cast by Charles & George Mears in 1850.

== Governance ==
The village falls in the 'Highnam with Haw Bridge' electoral ward. This ward starts in the north at Forthampton and stretches south to Minsterworth. The total ward population at the 2011 census was 4,206.

== See also ==
- St Oswald's Church, Lassington
- Oakridge, Tewkesbury, Gloucestershire
