= Highnam Court =

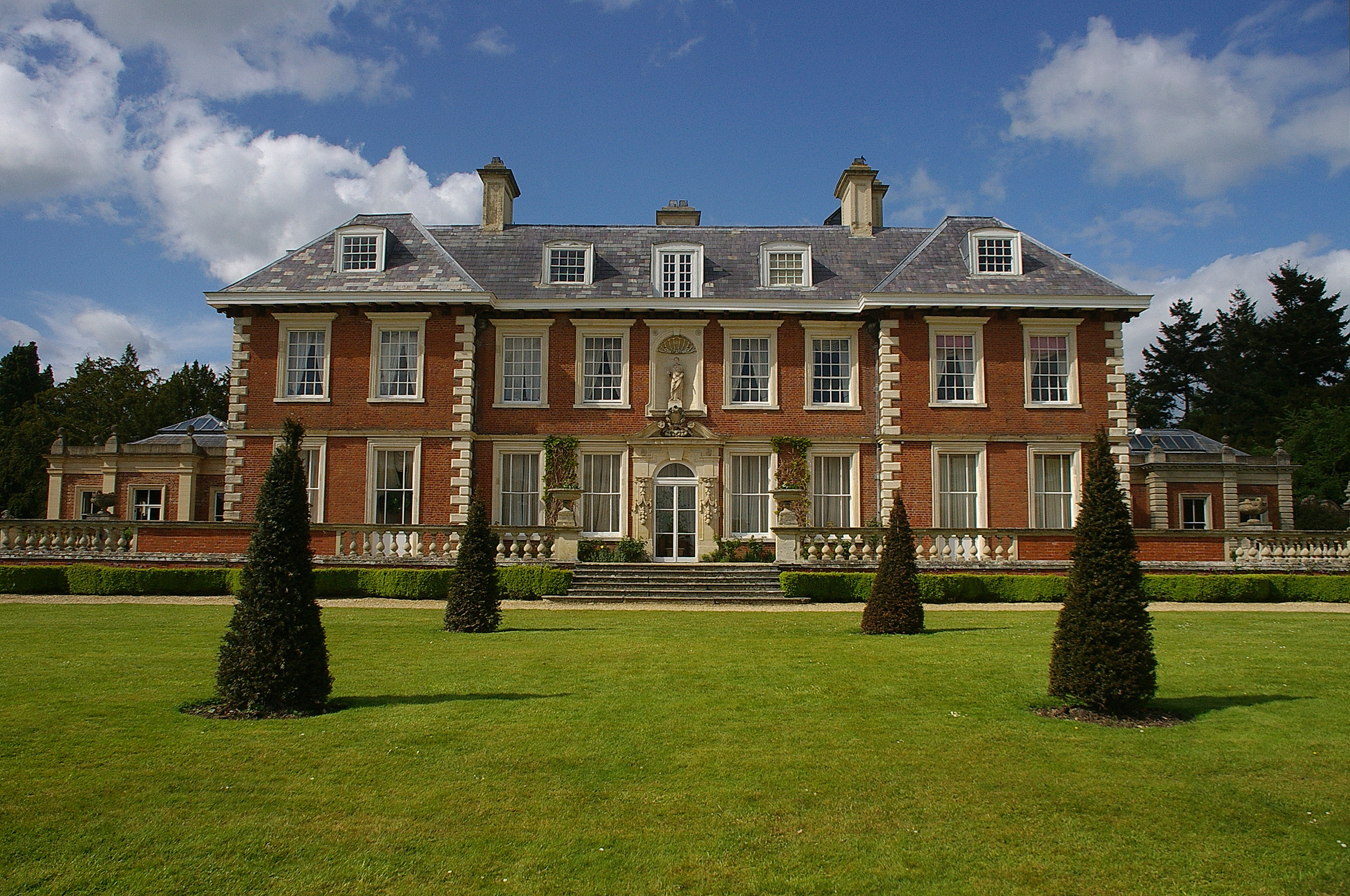
- South facade of Highnam Court

- Location within Gloucestershire

General information
- Type: Country house
- Architectural style: Artisan Mannerism
- Location: Highnam, Gloucestershire, England
- Coordinates: 51.872119°N 2.301292°W
- Construction started: 1658
- Renovated: 1994 - present (most recent)
- Owner: Roger Head

Height
- Roof: Hipped, Slate

Design and construction
- Designations: Grade I Listed

Highnam Court is a Grade I listed country house in Highnam, Gloucestershire, England, constructed in the 17th century. The estate passed from the Cooke family to the Guise family and, in the mid-19th century, was purchased by a member of the Gambier-Parry family.

Renovations were undertaken during the tenures of the Guise and Gambier-Parry families, with the latter also including extensive development of the grounds. The Gambier-Parry family held the estate until the late 20th century.

== History ==
Highnam Court is a 17th-century, Grade I listed building in Highnam, Gloucestershire, just north of the A40. The country house was built in 1658 for William Cooke, the son of Sir Robert Cooke, following damage to the original structure in the English Civil War.

Following William Cooke's death in 1703, the estate was inherited by his son Edward Cooke. The latter was succeeded upon his death about 1724 by his son Dennis Cooke. After Dennis Cooke's demise in 1747, Highnam Court was inherited by his sisters. The manor underwent improvements of its interior in the 18th century for owner Sir John Guise, 1st Baronet, the son of one of Dennis Cooke's sisters. Further alterations were made in the early 19th century for his son and successor, Sir Berkeley William Guise, 2nd Baronet. Following his death in 1834, his brother, Sir John Wright Guise, was heir to the estate.

Thomas Gambier-Parry purchased the estate from Guise in 1838. Architect Lewis Vulliamy renovated the house for him in 1840 and 1855. Changes included the construction of a single-story wing across the rear of the manor, as well as the extension of a service wing which dated to the early 19th century. Further renovations by David Brandon in 1869 were also performed on behalf of Gambier-Parry, and included a billiard room.

Thomas Gambier-Parry died in 1888; his widowed second wife Ethelinda Lear retained the manor until her demise in 1896. She was succeeded by her husband's son, the youngest child of his first marriage, composer Sir Charles Hubert Hastings Parry. Upon Parry's death in 1918, his half-brother Major Ernest Gambier-Parry succeeded to the estate. After the major's death in 1936, the estate passed to his one surviving son, Thomas Mark Gambier-Parry, who resided at Highnam Court until his death in 1966.

During the Second World War, Highnam Court was commissioned on 28 April 1941 as an overspill centre for navy recruits, and defined as a tender to HMS Ganges. On 31 January 1942 operations at Highnam Court were transferred to HMS Cabbala.

About 1950, Thomas Mark Gambier-Parry made a gift of the farms of the estate to his cousin, W. P. Cripps. Thomas Mark Gambier-Parry was succeeded by his cousin, Thomas Gambier-Parry's great-grandson, Thomas Fenton, who inherited Highnam Court as a teenager. Before his death in 2010, Fenton gave documents related to the administration of the estate, covering the period from 1650 to 1940, to the Gloucestershire Archives.

Ownership of the manor was transferred in 1977; Gloucester businessman Roger Head later became the owner of Highnam Court in 1994, serving as High Sheriff in 2015–16. Recent improvements to the house include the construction of an orangery, an addition at the west side of the house, which was finished in 2001. While the house remains privately owned, the gardens are opened to the public periodically throughout the year. The orangery is also sometimes utilised for public exhibition space or provision of refreshments.

== Design ==
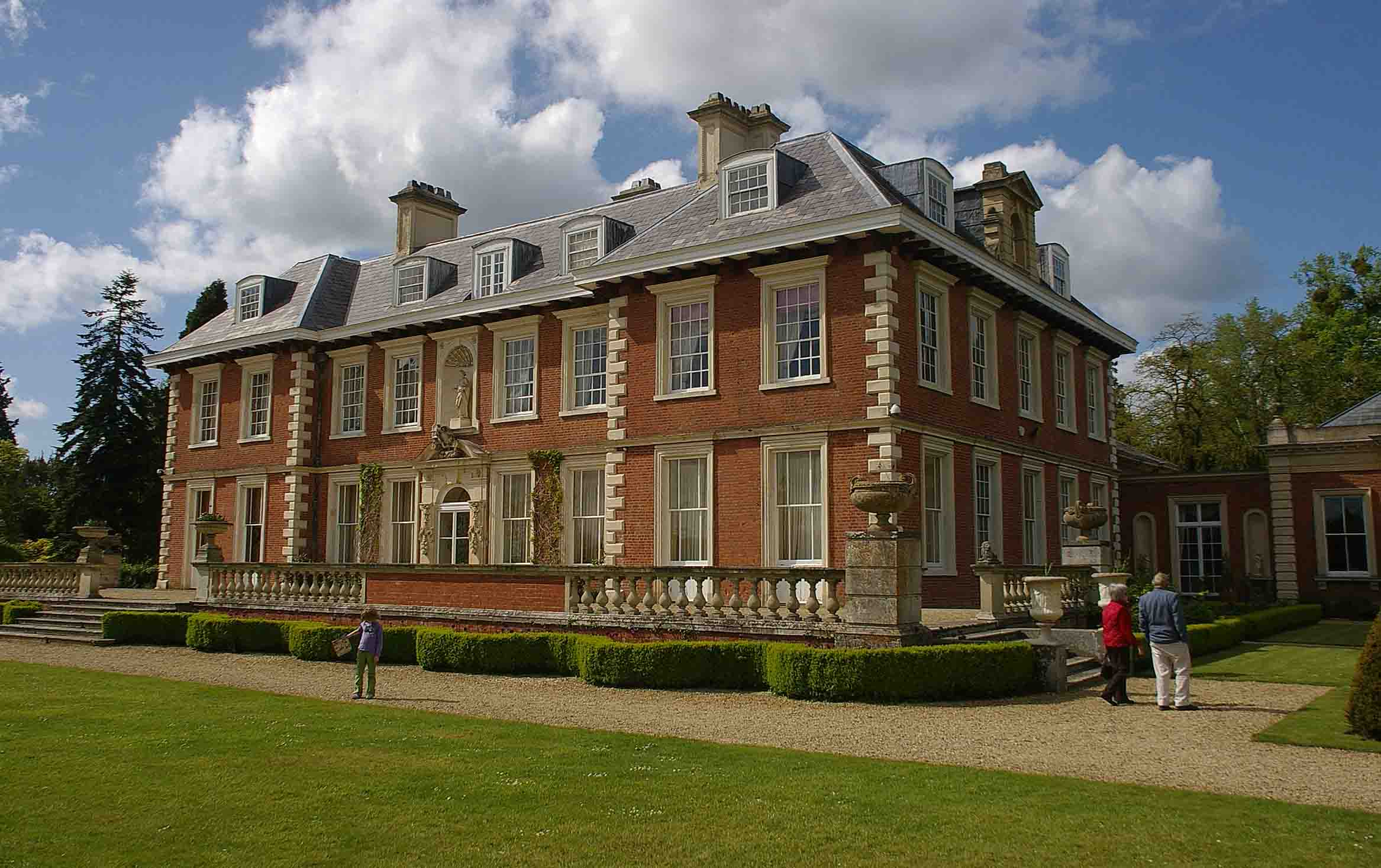
The south and east sides of Highnam Court demonstrate a nine by five bay plan.

The architectural style of the manor is Artisan Mannerism. The south facade of the house was originally the site of the front entrance to the manor. However, when Thomas Gambier-Parry purchased the estate in 1838, he reversed the functions of the south and north sides of the house. He built a portico on the rear of the manor and redirected the driveway there, such that the north side of the house became the entrance. His alteration of the layout resulted in the south side of the manor having unobstructed views of the gardens and adjacent lake. The exterior is of brick with contrasting ashlar trim, stone quoins, and some artificial stone. The hipped roof is slate. The nine-window, symmetric south facade is two and a half storeys and features a five-window, slightly recessed centre section.

The entrance is centrally positioned, with a pair of French doors and a plain, semicircular fanlight. The baroque surround includes a keystone and bilateral stone columns with swags and fruit. There are four windows on either side of the south entrance; each is six-paned, with the centre panes the widest. On the next floor, the windows have twenty panes. Over the entrance, there is a stone niche containing the statue of a female figure. It is believed that the statue of Oliver Cromwell as Hercules that is in the alcove in the east garden was originally in the niche. There are five dormer windows, the four outer dormers each with sixteen panes. The fifth, central dormer window has twenty panes.

The north side of the house includes a one-storey wing with the orangery to the west and billiard room to the east, as well as the service wing which is set far back to the west. The north facade features a portico to the left, with Ionic columns. The interior of the manor has a double-pile plan, with panelled shutters over the windows of the main rooms on the ground floor and the rooms at the south facade on the first floor. There are mahogany doors to the corner rooms on the ground floor. The music room and billiard room both feature marble fireplaces. In the gold room, a marble buffet and mirror face a marble fireplace. The plaster ceiling has figures of a lion, eagle, dolphin, and phoenix at the corners of the room, and is an example of the "fine rococo plasterwork" in the house.

In the central room along the south side (garden side) of the house, there are two fireplaces, with carved surrounds. The green room to the left, also along the south side of the manor, has a marble fireplace as well. The main stairs are of the 18th century; the cantilevered stone staircase has iron balusters. An older staircase has stone for the first four treads, but wood for the steps above that level. Four additional fireplaces are present on the first floor.

== Gardens ==
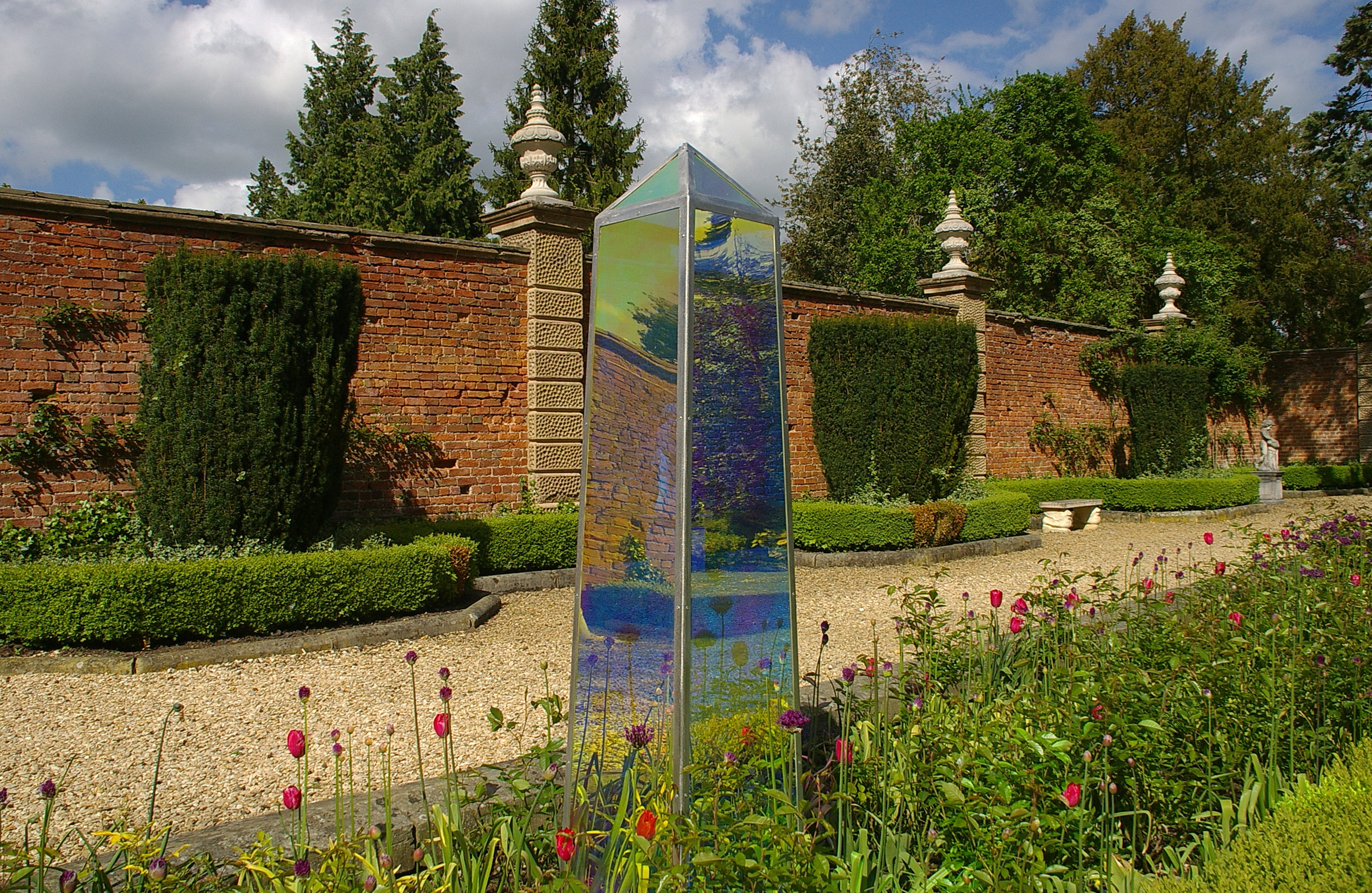
Winter garden terrace

In the 18th century, Sir John Guise not only made improvements to the interior of Highnam Court; he also landscaped the grounds. During the mid-19th century reversal of function of the north and south sides of the manor, an Italianate terrace was built along the south side. The grade II listed south terrace was the work of architect Vulliamy in 1843, and includes a balustrade, urns, and steps. Thomas Gambier-Parry began to lay out his gardens in 1840 with the assistance of James Pulham and, less than four decades later, they were among the loveliest in the United Kingdom. However, during most of the 20th century, the gardens were neglected and became overgrown.

Restoration of the gardens commenced in 1994, after Roger Head became the owner. The Pulhamite winter garden, installed between 1849 and 1862, includes grottos, rock gardens, and waterfalls, and was planted with evergreens and ferns. The east garden, which was first installed in 1869 as a formal flower garden, required vigorous pruning of the Irish yews more than a century later. The garden, replanted annually, is underplanted with bulbs which bloom in the spring. A new, potager-style kitchen garden was planted in 2001. The orangery parterre, just southwest of the orangery at the west side of the manor, was planted in 2001. Boxwood hedging surrounds topiary evergreens, roses, lavender, and spring-blooming bulbs.

Restoration of the rose garden required the use of 19th-century photographs. While less ornate than the 19th-century rose garden, the restored garden had arches installed along the rose garden broad walk in 2004. The rose beds were enlarged, to create a more dramatic vista. A wisteria walk was planted in 2004 to serve as the entrance to the winter garden terrace. The wisteria walk includes a limestone sculpture by artist Mat Chivers. The winter garden terrace, also known as the ladies winter walk, is located along the south wall of the main walled garden, southwest of the manor. The wall is divided into sections by vermiculated columns of Pulhamite. At one time, statues were positioned between the columnar yews that run along the terrace. However, the statues were vandalised. New statues of reconstituted stone depict the four elements; obelisks by Robert Bryant are also new additions. An old clematis arch at the winter garden terrace has been restored. The orangery knot garden to the west of the house was finished in December 2004, and includes variegated boxwood hedging and a statue of Mercury, the Winged Messenger.

One of the most recent additions to the gardens at Highnam Court is a meadow garden. In addition to the Grade I listing of the manor, Highnam Court park and garden are Grade II* listed, and multiple individual structures in the garden and estate are Grade II listed.
