= Hubert Parry =

British composer, teacher and historian (1848–1918)

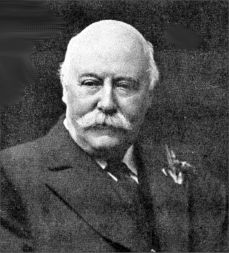
Hubert Parry in The Musical Quarterly, c. 1916

Sir Charles Hubert Hastings Parry, 1st Baronet (27 February 1848 – 7 October 1918), was an English composer, teacher and historian of music. Born in Richmond Hill, Bournemouth, Parry's first major works appeared in 1880. As a composer he is best known for the choral song "Jerusalem", his 1902 setting for the coronation anthem "I was glad", the choral and orchestral ode Blest Pair of Sirens, and the hymn tune "Repton", which sets the words "Dear Lord and Father of Mankind". His orchestral works include five symphonies and a set of Symphonic Variations. He also composed the music for Ode to Newfoundland, the national anthem for the Dominion of Newfoundland.

After early attempts to work in insurance at his father's behest, Parry was taken up by George Grove, first as a contributor to Grove's massive Dictionary of Music and Musicians in the 1870s and '80s, and then in 1883 as professor of composition and musical history at the Royal College of Music, of which Grove was the first head. In 1895 Parry succeeded Grove as head of the college, remaining in the post for the rest of his life. He was concurrently Heather Professor of Music at the University of Oxford from 1900 to 1908. He wrote several books about music and music history, the best-known of which is probably his 1909 study of Johann Sebastian Bach.

Both in his lifetime and afterwards, Parry's reputation and critical standing have varied. His academic duties were considerable and prevented him from devoting all his energies to composition, but some contemporaries such as Charles Villiers Stanford rated him as the finest English composer since Henry Purcell; others, such as Frederick Delius, did not. Parry's influence on later composers, by contrast, is widely recognised. Edward Elgar learned much of his craft from Parry's articles in Grove's Dictionary, and among those who studied under Parry at the Royal College were Ralph Vaughan Williams, Gustav Holst, Frank Bridge and John Ireland.

He was also an enthusiastic cruising sailor and owned successively the yawl The Latois and the ketch The Wanderer. In 1908 he was elected as a member of the Royal Yacht Squadron, the only composer so honoured.

== Biography ==
=== Early years ===
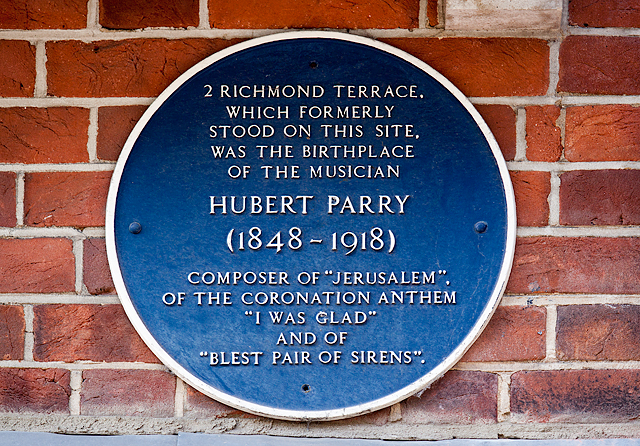
A blue plaque marking Parry's birthplace at 2 Richmond Terrace, Bournemouth

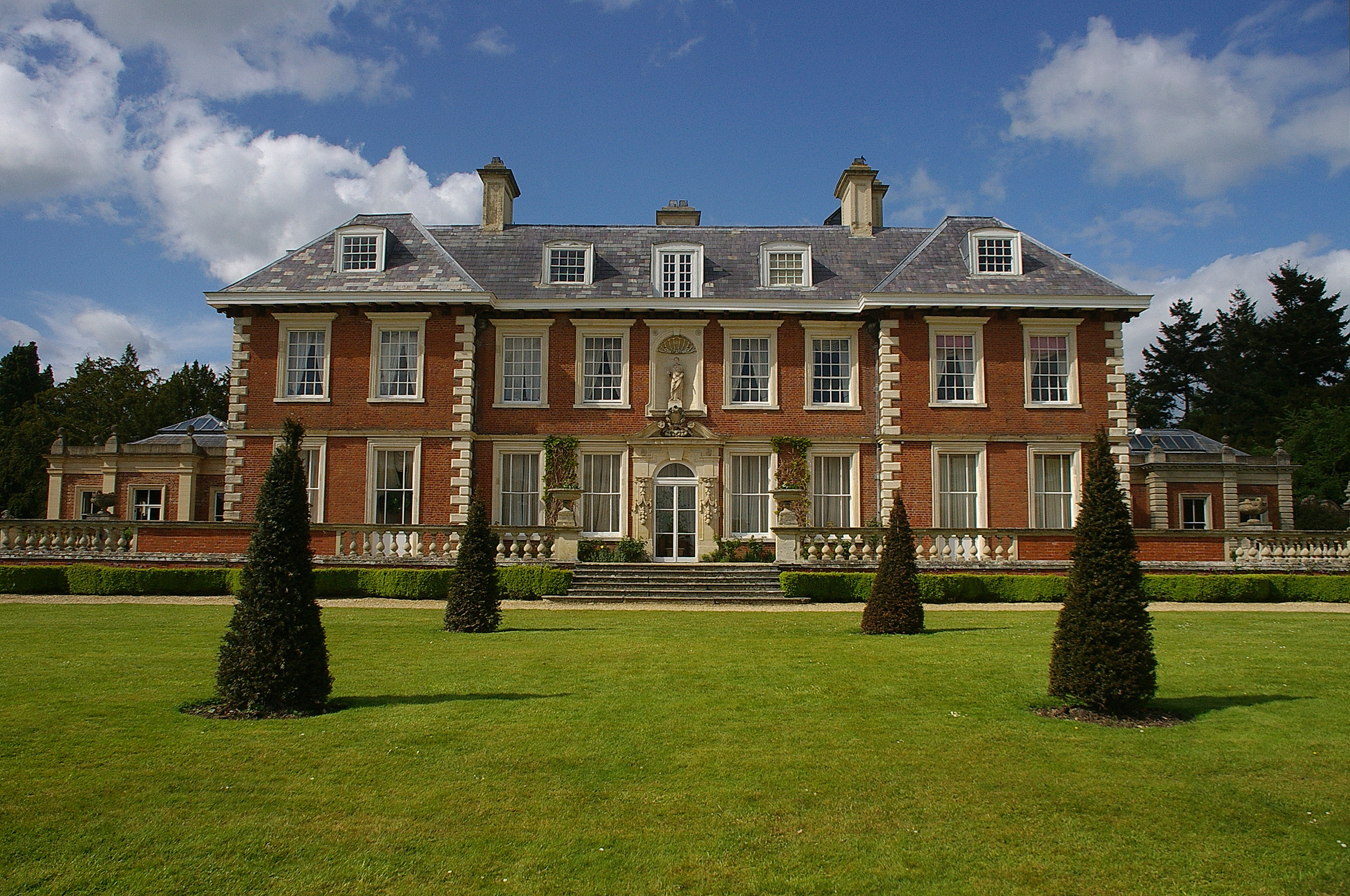
Highnam Court, Gloucestershire, the family's country house

Hubert Parry was born in Richmond Hill, Bournemouth, the youngest of the six children of Thomas Gambier Parry (1816–1888) and his first wife, Isabella née Fynes-Clinton (1816–1848), of Highnam Court, Gloucestershire. Gambier Parry, the son of Richard and Mary Parry, had been orphaned at the age of five and brought up by his maternal family, adopting their name, Gambier, as part of his surname. Having inherited enormous wealth from his grandfather, Thomas Parry (a director of the East India Company who died in 1816), Gambier Parry was able to buy a country seat at Highnam Court, a seventeenth-century house near the River Severn and two miles west of Gloucester.

Gambier Parry was an eminent collector of works of early Italian art at a time well before it was fashionable or widely known, and was also a painter and designer of some talent; he invented "spirit fresco", a process of mural painting appropriate for the damp English climate, which he used in his private chapel at Highnam as well as in Ely Cathedral. Besides his love of painting, Gambier Parry was himself musical, having studied piano and French horn as well as composition during his education at Eton. However, his advanced taste in the visual arts – he was a friend of John Ruskin and an admirer of Turner – did not transfer to his musical interests, which were highly conventional: Mendelssohn and Spohr were the limit of his appreciation for modern music. Nonetheless, he staunchly supported the Three Choirs Festival, both financially and against the threat of their closure between 1874 and 1875 by the puritanical Dean of Worcester.

Three of Gambier Parry's children died in infancy, and Isabella Parry died of consumption, aged 32, twelve days after the birth of Hubert. She was buried in the churchyard of St Peter's Church, Bournemouth, where Hubert was baptised two days later. He grew up at Highnam with his surviving siblings, (Charles) Clinton (1840–1883) and Lucy (1841–1861). Gambier Parry remarried in 1851, and had a further six children. Isabella's untimely death almost certainly affected her children, most obviously the eldest surviving son, Clinton, who was only seven when she died, and, more subtly, Hubert: according to his daughter Dorothea (1876–1963), his stepmother Ethelinda's "love for the young ones", meaning her own children, gave her little or no time for her stepchildren. Gambier Parry was often absent from home, being either away in London or on the Continent. Hubert's early childhood, with Clinton away at school and Lucy seven years his senior, was largely solitary, his only regular companion being a governess.

Clinton learned to play cello and piano, and his considerable musical talent became evident ahead of Hubert's. Yet despite their father's active interest in music, such activity was seen as a pastime, and was frowned upon as a career as being too uncertain and, unlike painting, a less than professional pursuit unseemly for a gentleman. (Note: Clinton's musical talent developed further during his time at Eton, though his surviving diary records his severe depression following his father's disapproval of both his musical activity and, more seriously, his loss of religious faith. His musical ambitions increased further as a student at the University of Oxford: his time there started auspiciously with his performing several times before the Prince of Wales, including a number of his own compositions.)

From January 1856 to the middle of 1858, Hubert attended a preparatory school in Malvern, from where he moved to Twyford Preparatory School in Hampshire. At Twyford, his interest in music was encouraged by the headmaster, and by two organists, S. S. Wesley at Winchester Cathedral, and Edward Brind, at Highnam church. From Wesley he gained an enduring love of Bach's music, which according to The Times "ultimately found expression in his most important literary work, Johann Sebastian Bach, the Story of the Development of a Great Composer (1909)".

Brind gave Parry piano and basic harmony lessons, and took him to the Three Choirs Festival in Hereford in 1861. Among the choral works performed at that festival were Mendelssohn's Elijah, Mozart's Requiem, and Handel's Samson and Messiah. Orchestral works included Beethoven's Pastoral and Mendelssohn's Italian symphonies. The experience left a great impression on Parry, and effectively marked the beginning of his lifelong association with the festival.

=== Eton and the youngest Bachelor of Music ===
Just as Parry left Twyford for Eton College in 1861, home life was clouded by Clinton's disgrace: after a promising start at Oxford, studying history and music, Clinton had been sent down for womanising, drinking and indulging in opium. During Parry's first term at Eton, further news came that his sister, Lucy, had died of consumption on 16 November. That Parry was deeply affected by this is evident in his 1864 diary where he confessed a profound sense of loss. Nonetheless, Parry threw himself into life at Eton with characteristic energy, and distinguished himself at sport as well as music, despite early signs of the heart trouble that was to dog him for the rest of his life. Meanwhile, Clinton, despite the intervention of his father to secure his return to Oxford, was sent down a further two times, the last irrevocably for not working; in 1863 Clinton left for Paris under a cloud. Though Parry never mentioned being under family pressure, his biographer, Jeremy Dibble, speculates that since "his interest in music had grown to such a point where it could no longer be ignored or thrown away ... the knowledge of his father’s opposition to a musical career, and having seen how such a denial had contributed to the rebellious nature of his brother's character, the burden of expectation must have seemed enormous."

Eton was not at that time noted for its music, despite the interest of a number of its pupils. As there was no one at the school competent enough to advance Parry's studies in composition, he turned to George Elvey, the organist of St George's Chapel, Windsor Castle, and began studies with him sometime in 1863. Elvey was musically conservative, preferring Handel to Mendelssohn, and though Parry initially idolised his teacher, he eventually realised how unadventurous he was compared to S. S. Wesley. Parry nonetheless benefited from Elvey's tuition and gained the advantage of being able to write anthems for the choir of St George's Chapel, which under Elvey's direction had reached a standard exceptional in English choral singing of that time. Elvey started his pupil on the contrapuntal disciplines of canon and fugue; recognising his pupil's talent, he soon became ambitious to train him to a standard sufficient to earn the music degree at Oxford. He therefore introduced his student to the string quartets of Haydn and Mozart, and ultimately to some of the rudiments of orchestration. Meanwhile, Parry, on his own initiative, explored the orchestral scores of Beethoven, Weber, and his beloved Mendelssohn. While still at Eton, Parry successfully sat the Oxford Bachelor of Music examination, the youngest person who had ever done so. His examination exercise, a cantata, O Lord, Thou hast cast us out, "astonished" the Heather Professor of Music, Sir Frederick Ouseley, and was triumphantly performed and published in 1867.

In 1867 Parry left Eton and went up to Exeter College, Oxford. He did not study music, being intended by his father for a commercial career, and instead read Law and Modern History. His musical concerns took second place during his time at Oxford, though during one summer holiday, acting on the advice of Wesley, he went to Stuttgart and studied with Henry Hugh Pierson. As Parry recalled, Pierson's prime aim appeared to be "to disabuse me of Bach and Mendelssohn", and he set Parry the task of re-orchestrating works by Weber, Rossini and Beethoven, as well as some of Parry's own works. Parry came back to England much more critical of Mendelssohn's music, and discovered more adventurous repertoire through attending concerts at London's Crystal Palace: he was particularly taken by Schumann's Second Symphony, with its "wildly glorious" Scherzo and the slow movement's "delicious" orchestration and "most wonderful ... modulation". He went into raptures about Beethoven's Sixth and Eighth symphonies, confessing in his diary: "I can hardly bear to hear or smell a large work by Mendelssohn in the same week as a great work of dear old Beet." Yet, as Dibble notes, Mendelssohn's influence on Parry's own music persisted.

=== Double harness ===
After leaving Exeter College, Oxford. Parry was an underwriter at Lloyd's of London from 1870 to 1877. He found the work uncongenial and wholly contrary to his talents and inclinations, but felt obliged to persevere with it, to satisfy not only his father, but his prospective parents-in-law. In 1872 he married Elizabeth Maude Herbert (1851–1933), second daughter of the politician Sidney Herbert and his wife Elizabeth. His in-laws agreed with his father in preferring a conventional career for him, although Parry proved as unsuccessful in insurance as he was successful in music. He and his wife had two daughters, Dorothea and Gwendolen, named after George Eliot characters. (Note: The elder daughter, Dorothea (1876–1963), married the politician Arthur Ponsonby in 1898, and had a son and a daughter. The younger daughter, Gwendolen Maud (1878–1959), married the baritone Harry Plunket Greene (1865–1936) and had two sons and a daughter.)

Parry studied with William Sterndale Bennett (l) and Edward Dannreuther

Parry continued his musical studies alongside his work in insurance. In London he took lessons from William Sterndale Bennett, but finding them insufficiently demanding (Note: Parry wrote, "He was kind and sympathetic, but he was too sensitive ever to criticize".) he sought lessons from Johannes Brahms. Brahms was not available, and Parry was recommended to the pianist Edward Dannreuther, "wisest and most sympathetic of teachers". Dannreuther started by giving Parry piano lessons, but soon extended their studies to analysis and composition. At this stage in his musical development, Parry moved away from the classical traditions inspired by Mendelssohn. Dannreuther introduced him to the music of Wagner, which influenced his compositions of these years.

At the same time as his compositions were coming to public notice, Parry was taken up as a musical scholar by George Grove, first as his assistant editor for his new Dictionary of Music and Musicians, to which post Parry was appointed in 1875 and contributed 123 articles. Among those who benefited from these writings was the young Edward Elgar; he did not attend a music college and, as he said in later life, had been most helped by Parry's articles. In 1883, Grove, as the first director of the new Royal College of Music, appointed him as the college's professor of composition and musical history.

Parry (back l.), in 1910 with Alexander Mackenzie (front c.), Charles Villiers Stanford (front r.), Edward German (back r.) and Dan Godfrey

Parry's first major works appeared in 1880: a piano concerto, which Dannreuther premiered, and a choral setting of scenes from Shelley's Prometheus Unbound. The first performance of the latter has been held to mark the start of a "renaissance" in English music, but was regarded by many critics as too avant garde. Parry scored a greater contemporary success with the ode Blest Pair of Sirens (1887), commissioned by and dedicated to Charles Villiers Stanford, one of the first British musicians to recognise Parry's talent. Stanford described Parry as the greatest English composer since Purcell. Blest Pair of Sirens, a setting of Milton's "At a Solemn Musick", suggested as a text by Grove, established Parry as the leading English choral composer of his day; this had the drawback of bringing him a series of commissions for conventional oratorios, a genre with which he was not in sympathy.

=== Peak years ===
Now well established as a composer and scholar, Parry received many commissions. Among them were choral works such as the cantata Ode on Saint Cecilia's Day (1889), the oratorios Judith (1888) and Job (1892), and the psalm-setting De Profundis (1891). In 1894, Lady Helen Radnor commissioned him to write Lady Radnor’s Suite for her all-female string orchestra. In 1905 he produced a lighter work, The Pied Piper of Hamelin , described later as "a bubbling well of humour." The biblical oratorios were well received by the public, but Parry's lack of sympathy with the form was mocked by Bernard Shaw, then writing musical criticism in London. He denounced Job as "the most utter failure ever achieved by a thoroughly respectworthy musician. There is not one bar in it that comes within fifty thousand miles of the tamest line in the poem." Parry, along with Stanford and Alexander Mackenzie, was regarded by some as joint leader of the "English Musical Renaissance"; (Note: The term originated in an article by the critic Joseph Bennett in 1882. In his review in The Daily Telegraph of Parry's First Symphony he wrote that the work gave "capital proof that English music has arrived at a renaissance period." J. A. Fuller Maitland, chief music critic to The Times, became the most assiduous proponent of the theory, in his 1902 book English Music in the XIXth Century.) Shaw considered them a mutual admiration society, purveying "sham classics"; reviewing Eden by Stanford in 1891 he wrote

But who am I that I should be believed, to the disparagement of eminent musicians? If you doubt that Eden is a masterpiece, ask Dr Parry and Dr Mackenzie, and they will applaud it to the skies. Surely Dr Mackenzie's opinion is conclusive; for is he not the composer of Veni Creator, guaranteed as excellent music by Professor Stanford and Dr Parry? You want to know who Parry is? Why, the composer of Blest Pair of Sirens, as to the merits of which you only have to consult Dr Mackenzie and Professor Stanford.

Contemporary critics generally regarded Parry's orchestral music as of secondary importance in his output, but in the late twentieth and early twenty-first centuries many of Parry's orchestral pieces have been revived. These include five symphonies, a set of Symphonic Variations in E minor, the Overture to an Unwritten Tragedy (1893) and the Elegy for Brahms (1897). In 1883 Parry wrote music to accompany the Cambridge Greek Play The Birds by Aristophanes, a production which starred the mediaevalist and ghost-story writer, M. R. James. Parry received an honorary degree from Cambridge University in the same year. Subsequently, he wrote music for Oxford productions of Aristophanes: The Frogs (1892), The Clouds (1905) and The Acharnians (1914). He had also provided elaborate incidental music for a West End production by Beerbohm Tree, Hypatia (1893). Among Parry's considerable output of music for the theatre, there was only one attempt at opera: Guenever, which was turned down by the Carl Rosa Opera Company.

A composer who counts is rare enough anywhere, any time. Do not try to use him as a mixture of university don, cabinet minister, city magnate, useful hack, or a dozen things besides. A great blow was delivered against English music when Parry was appointed to succeed Sir George Grove as director of the RCM

— Robin Legge, The Daily Telegraph music critic, 1918

When Grove retired as director of the Royal College of Music, Parry succeeded him from January 1895 and held the post until his death. In 1900 he succeeded John Stainer as Heather Professor. In an obituary tribute in 1918 Robin Legge, music critic of The Daily Telegraph, lamented these academic calls on Parry's time, believing that they got in the way of his principal calling – composition. Ralph Vaughan Williams, who studied at the RCM under Parry, rated him highly as both composer and teacher. Of Parry in the latter capacity he wrote:

The secret of Parry's greatness as a teacher was his broad-minded sympathy; his was not that so called broadmindedness which comes of want of conviction; his musical antipathies were very strong, and sometimes, in the opinion of those who disagreed with them, unreasonable; but in appraising a composer's work he was able to set these on one side and see beyond them. And it was in this spirit that he examined the work of his pupils. A student's compositions are seldom of any intrinsic merit, and a teacher is apt to judge them on their face-value. But Parry looked further than this; he saw what lay behind the faulty utterance and made it his object to clear the obstacles that prevented fullness of musical speech. His watchword was "characteristic" – that was the thing which mattered.

As head of the Royal College of Music, Parry numbered among his leading pupils Ralph Vaughan Williams, Gustav Holst, Frank Bridge and John Ireland.

Despite the demands of his academic posts, Parry's personal beliefs, which were Darwinian and humanist, led him to compose a series of six "ethical cantatas", experimental works in which he hoped to supersede the traditional oratorio and cantata forms. They were generally unsuccessful with the public, though Elgar admired The Vision of Life (1907), and The Soul's Ransom (1906) has had several modern performances.

Following the death of his stepmother, Ethelinda Lear Gambier-Parry, in 1896, Parry succeeded to the family estate at Highnam. He was created a Knight Bachelor in 1898. It was announced that he would receive a baronetcy in the 1902 Coronation Honours list published on 26 June 1902 for the (subsequently postponed) coronation of King Edward VII, and on 24 July 1902 he was created a Baronet, of Highnam Court, in the parish of Highnam, in the county of Gloucester.

=== Last years ===
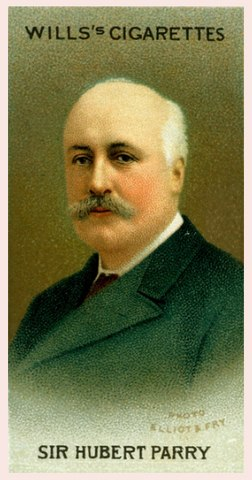
Parry shown on a 1914 cigarette card

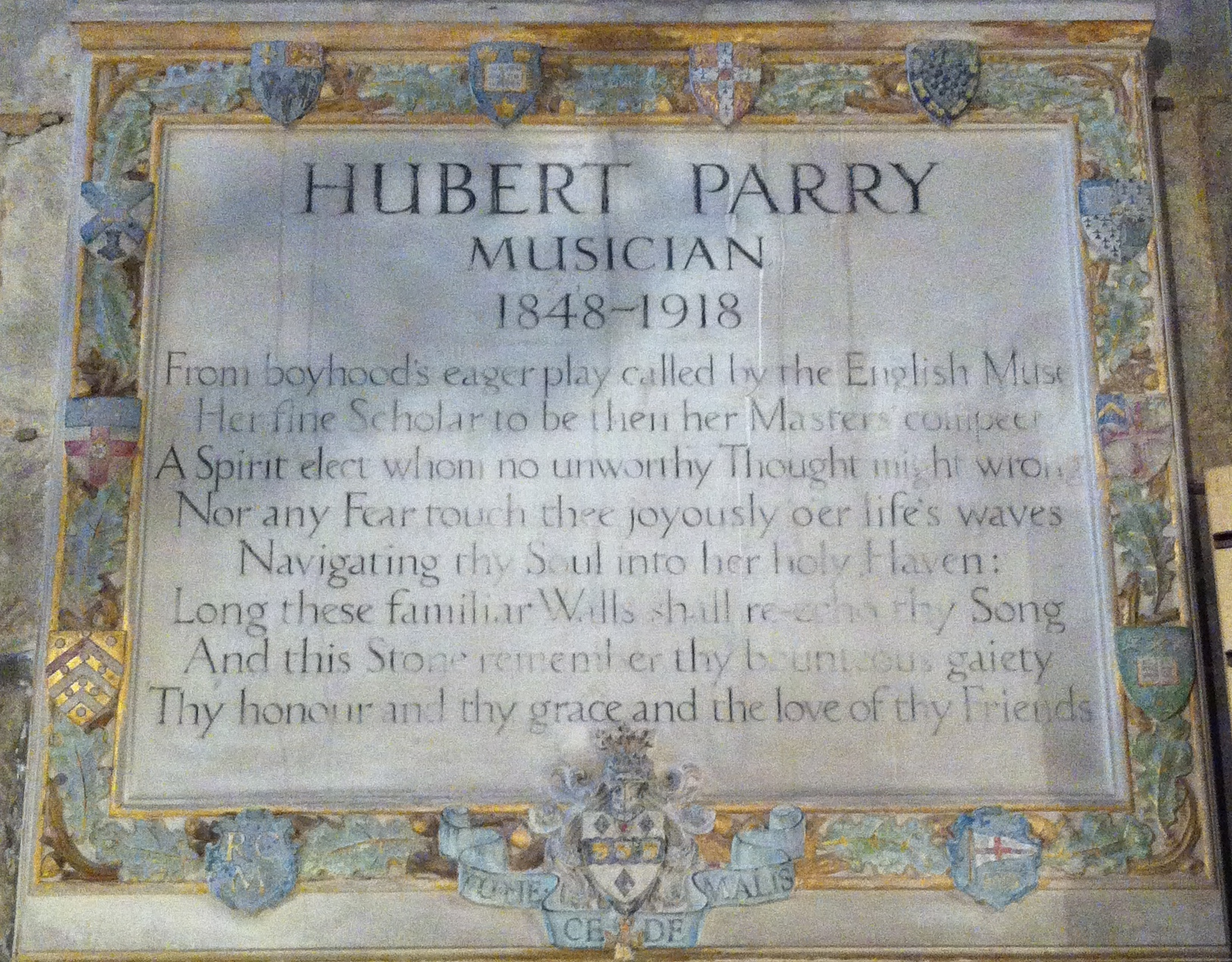
Memorial to Hubert Parry in Gloucester Cathedral. Inscription by Robert Bridges

Parry resigned his Oxford appointment on medical advice in 1908 and, in the last decade of his life, produced some of his best-known works, including the Symphonic Fantasia 1912 (also called Symphony No. 5), the Ode on the Nativity (1912) and the Songs of Farewell (1916–1918). The piece by which he is best known, the setting of William Blake's poem "And did those feet in ancient time" (1916), was immediately taken up by the suffragist movement, with which both Parry and his wife were strongly in sympathy.

Parry held German music and its traditions to be the pinnacle of music, and was a friend of German culture in general. He was, accordingly, certain that Britain and Germany would never go to war against each other, and was in despair when World War I broke out. In the words of the Oxford Dictionary of National Biography: "During the war he watched a life's work of progress and education being wiped away as the male population, particularly the new fertile generation of composing talent—of the Royal College, dwindled." During the war, he acted as chairman of the Music in Wartime Committee, and did much to relieve the prevailing distress among poorer musicians.

In the autumn of 1918 Parry contracted Spanish flu during the global pandemic and died at Knightscroft, Rustington, West Sussex, on 7 October aged 70. The death certificate says cause of death: 1. Influenza; 2. Septicaemia. His daughter, Gwendoline Maud Greene, was present at his death. At the urging of Stanford, he was buried in St Paul's Cathedral. The site of his birthplace, in Richmond Hill, Bournemouth, next door to the Square, is marked with a blue plaque; in Gloucester Cathedral, there is a memorial tablet with an inscription by the Poet Laureate Robert Bridges, unveiled during the Three Choirs Festival of 1922. Parry's baronetcy became extinct at his death. Highnam passed to his half-brother, Major Ernest Gambier-Parry.

== Legacy ==
In 2015 seventy unpublished works by Parry were discovered, including some which may never have been publicly performed. The manuscripts were sent for auction by Parry's descendants but failed to reach their reserve price.

Documentary film about the music and life of Parry "The Prince and the Composer" was broadcast on BBC Four on 27 May 2011. The film was presented by Charles III, the then-Prince of Wales.

== Works ==
=== Music ===
Parry's biographer Jeremy Dibble writes:

Parry's musical style is a complex aggregate reflecting his assimilation of indigenous as well as continental traditions. Trained in the organ loft during his schooldays and educated through the degree system of the ancient universities, he had imbibed fully the aesthetics of Anglican church music and the oratorio-centred repertory of the provincial music festivals by the age of 18.

Many colleagues and critics have concluded that Parry's music is that of a conventional and not strongly creative Englishman. Delius said of him, "How a man rolling in wealth, the lord of many acres & living off the fat of the land can write anything about Job beats me entirely" and in 1948 Bax, who was unaware of Parry's radical politics, wrote, "Parry, Stanford, Mackenzie – they were all three solid reputable citizens ... model husbands and fathers without a doubt, respected members of the most irreproachably Conservative clubs, and in Yeats's phrase had 'no strange friend'. Of this I am sure." The view of Parry taken by Bax and Bernard Shaw was contradicted by his daughter Dorothea in 1956:

This fantastic legend about my father ... that he was conventional, a conservative squire, a sportsman, a churchman, and with no "strange friend" ... My father was the most naturally unconventional man I have known. He was a Radical, with a very strong bias against Conservatism ... He was a free-thinker and did not go to my christening. He never shot, not because he was against blood-sports, but felt out of touch and ill at ease in the company of those who enjoyed shooting parties. His friends, apart from his schoolfriends, were mostly in the artistic and literary world ... He was an ascetic and spent nothing on himself. The puritanical vein in him is considered by some to spoil his music, as tending to lack of colour. Far from its being an advantage to be the son of a Gloucestershire squire, my father's early life was a fight against prejudice. His father thought music unsuitable as a profession, and the critics of music in the mid-nineteenth century showed no mercy to anyone they considered privileged. My father was sensitive, and suffered from bouts of deep depression. The extraordinary misinterpretation of him that exists should not persist.

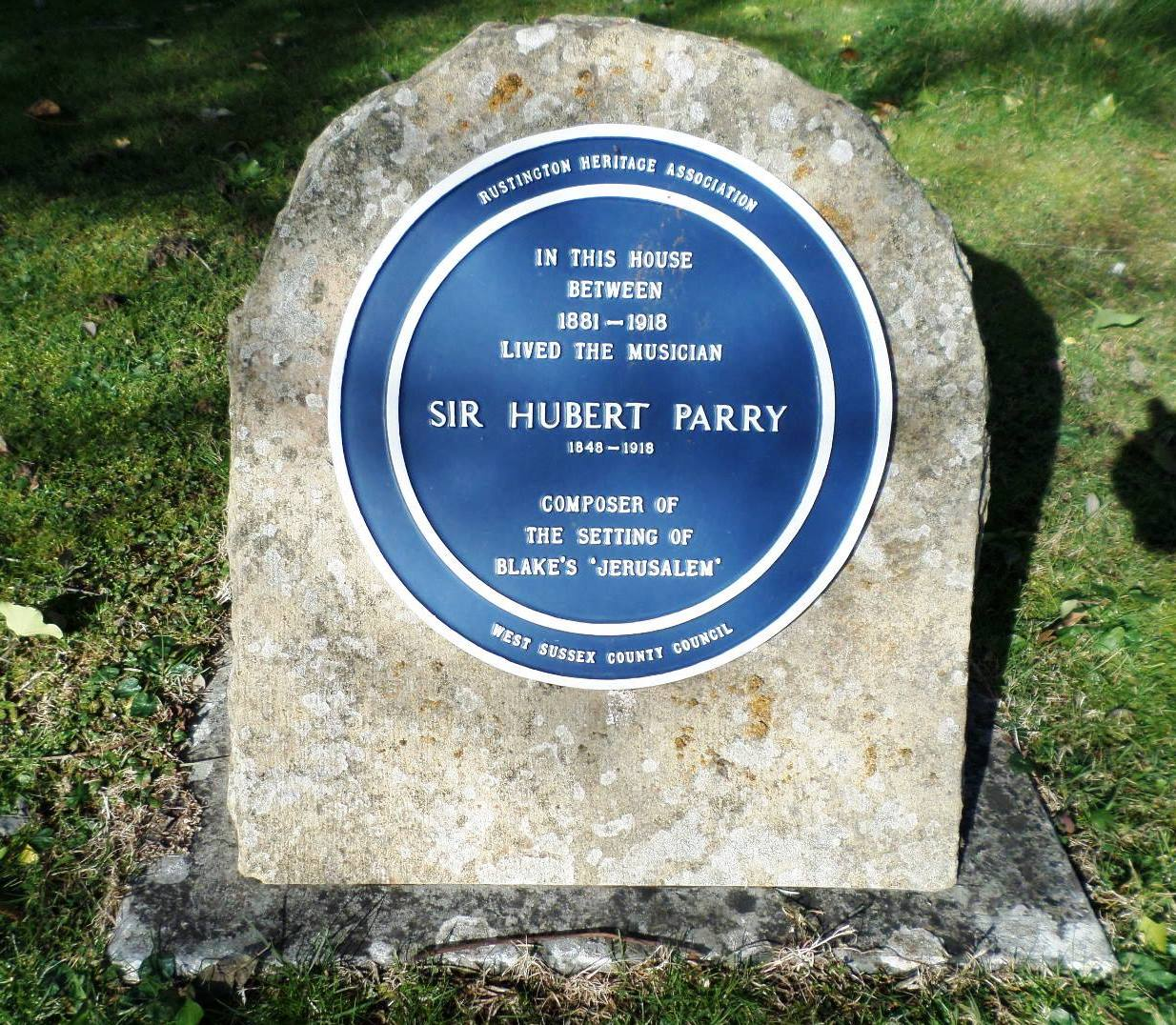
Plaque for Parry in Rustington

In an analysis of Parry's compositional process, Michael Allis draws attention to a widely held but inaccurate belief that Parry was a facile composer who dashed off new works without effort. He quotes the mid-20th century critics H. C. Colles and Eric Blom as equating Parry's supposed facility with superficiality. Allis also quotes Parry's diary, which regularly recorded his difficulties in composition: "struggled along with the Symphony", "thoroughly terrible and wearing grind over the revisions", "stuck fast" and so on. Parry himself is partly responsible for another belief about his music, that he was neither interested in nor good at orchestration. In a lecture at the RCM he was censorious of Berlioz who, in Parry's view, disguised commonplace musical ideas by glittering orchestration: "When divested of its amazingly variegated colour the ideas themselves do not convince us or exert much fascination." Bax and others took this to mean that Parry (and Stanford and Mackenzie) "regarded sensuous beauty of orchestral sound as not quite nice". In 2001, the American writers Nicolas Slonimsky and Laura Kuhn took the view: "In his orchestral music, Parry played a significant role in the fostering of the British symphonic tradition. While his orchestral works owe much to the German Romanticists, particularly Mendelssohn, Schumann, and Brahms, he nevertheless developed a personal style notable for its fine craftsmanship and mastery of diatonic writing. His 5 [symphonies] reveal a growing assurance in handling large forms. He also wrote some effective incidental music and fine chamber pieces."

The early influence of Wagner on Parry's music can be heard in the Concertstück for orchestra (1877), the overture Guillem de Cabestanh (1878), and especially in Scenes from Prometheus Unbound (1880). Dibble notes a more thoroughly absorbed Wagnerian influence in Blest Pair of Sirens, and points to the influence of Brahms on such works as the Piano Quartet in A flat (1879) and the Piano Trio in B minor (1884).

=== Books on music ===
Parry wrote about music throughout his adult life. As well as his 123 articles in Grove's Dictionary, his publications include Studies of Great Composers (1886); The Art of Music (1893), enlarged as The Evolution of the Art of Music (1896) and described by H. C. Colles as "one of the foundations of English musical literature"; The Music of the Seventeenth Century — Volume III of the Oxford History of Music (1902); Johann Sebastian Bach: the Story of the Development of a Great Personality (1909), rated by The Times as his most important book; and Style in Musical Art, collected Oxford lectures (1911).

== Arms ==
Coat of arms of Hubert Parry
Crest Three battleaxes erect Proper the blades to the dexter in front thereof five lozenges Sable. Escutcheon Argent on a fess invected between three lozenges Sable as many clarions Or. Motto Tu Ne Cede Malis

== Notes and references ==
Notes

=== Sources ===
- Allis, Michael (2002). Parry's Creative Process. Aldershot, Hants; Burlington, Vermont: Ashgate. ISBN 1840146818.
- Bax, Arnold (1943). Farewell, My Youth. London: Longmans, Green and Co. OCLC 462380567.
- Benoliel, Bernard (1997). Parry before Jerusalem. Aldershot: Ashgate. ISBN 0859679276.
- Carley, Lionel (1983). Delius, a Life in Letters. Vol. II, 1909–1934. Cambridge, Massachusetts: Harvard University Press. ISBN 0674195701.
- Dibble, Jeremy (1992). C. Hubert H. Parry: His Life and Music. Oxford: Oxford University Press. ISBN 0193153300.
- Eatock, Colin (2010). "The Crystal Palace Concerts: Canon Formation and the English Musical Renaissance". 19th-Century Music. 34 (1): 87–105. doi:10.1525/ncm.2010.34.1.087. ISSN 0148-2076.
- Reed, W. H. (1946). Elgar. London: Dent. OCLC 8858707.
- Shaw, Bernard (1989). Dan H. Laurence (ed.). Shaw's Music – The Complete Music Criticism of Bernard Shaw. Vol. 2. London: The Bodley Head. ISBN 0370312716.
- Slonimsky, Nicholas; Kuhn, Laura, eds. (2001). Baker's Biographical Dictionary of Musicians. Vol. 4. New York: Schirmer Reference. ISBN 0028655281.
- Vaughan Williams, Ralph (2007). David Manning (ed.). Vaughan Williams on Music. Oxford: Oxford University Press. ISBN 978-0199720408.

Baronetage of the United Kingdom
New creation	Baronet (of Highnam Court); 1902–1918	Extinct
Preceded by Noble baronets	Parry baronets of Highnam Court; 24 July 1902	Succeeded by Poynter baronets
