= 53rd Army =

53rd Army may refer to:

- Fifty-Third Army (Japan)
- 53rd Army (Soviet Union)
- 53rd Rocket Army, Soviet Union/Russia

== See also ==
- List of armies by number
- 53rd Division (disambiguation)
- 53rd Brigade (disambiguation)
- 53rd Regiment (disambiguation)
- 53rd Squadron (disambiguation)
- 53rd (disambiguation)
