= LIII Corps =

LIII Corps or 53rd Corps may refer to:

- 53rd Corps (German Empire)
- LIII Army Corps, Wehrmacht, Germany
- 53rd Rifle Corps, Soviet Union
- 53rd Lanarkshire Rifle Volunteer Corps, United Kingdom

== See also ==
- List of military corps by number
- 53rd Army (disambiguation)
- 53rd Brigade (disambiguation)
- 53rd Division (disambiguation)
- 53rd Regiment (disambiguation)
- 53rd Squadron (disambiguation)
- 53rd (disambiguation)
