= 53 =

53 may refer to:

- 53 (number), the natural number following 52 and preceding 54
- one of the years 53 BC, AD 53, 1953, 2053
- FiftyThree, an American privately held technology company that specializes in tools for mobile creation and visual thinking
- 53rd Regiment Alabama Cavalry
- 53rd Regiment of Foot (disambiguation)
- 53rd Division (disambiguation)
- 53 (Jacky Terrasson album), 2019
- "Fifty Three", a song by Karma to Burn from the album Arch Stanton, 2014
- Fifth Third Bank
- 53 Kalypso, a main-belt asteroid
- Cuba's international calling code
- DNS over UDP and TCP port 53 (Do53)

== See also ==
- 53rd (disambiguation)
