= 53rd =

53rd is the ordinal form of the number 53. 53rd or Fifty-third may also refer to:

- A fraction, 1/53, equal to one of 53 equal parts

== Geography ==
- 53rd meridian east, a line of longitude
- 53rd meridian west, a line of longitude
- 53rd parallel north, a circle of latitude
- 53rd parallel south, a circle of latitude
- 53rd Street (disambiguation)

== Military ==
- 53rd Army
- 53rd Brigade (disambiguation)
- 53rd Division (disambiguation)
- 53rd Regiment (disambiguation)
- 53rd Squadron (disambiguation)

== Other ==
- 53rd century
- 53rd century BC

== See also ==
- 53 (disambiguation)
