= SendThisFile =

File transfer service

- Founded: 2003
- Headquarters: Wichita, Kansas, United States
- Key people: Aaron Freeman (Co-Founder and CEO); Michael Freeman (Co-Founder and CFO)
- Industry: SaaS
- Products: Starter, Pro, Business, Enterprise, Premier, Isolated Cloud (free trials available)
- Website: www.sendthisfile.com

SendThisFile is a file transfer service operated by SendThisFile, Inc., which uses cloud computing and 128-bit TLS encryption to enable users to securely send and receive large data files through the Internet. The company was co-founded in 2003 by CEO Aaron Freeman and his father CFO Michael Freeman. SendThisFile has around 1.5 million users and has transferred over 40 million files.

The service is an alternative to e-mailing large e-mail attachments and in 2016 received recognition in the press as one of the best services available to do so.

== See also ==
- Cloud storage
- Comparison of file hosting services
- DropSend
- Pando (application)
- WeTransfer
- Smash (file transfer service)
