= Henry Lowrie Davies =

British Army general (1898–1975)

Henry Lowrie Davies CB CBE DSO MC
- Born: 25 January 1898; United Kingdom
- Died: 6 July 1975 (aged 77); United Kingdom
- Education: Dover College; Royal Military College, Sandhurst; Staff College, Quetta
- Military career
- Allegiance: British Indian Army; Pakistan Army
- Service years: 1916-1948
- Rank: Major-General
- Service number: 152142
- Unit: 39th Garhwal Rifles
- Commands: Commander 25th Indian Infantry Division; Deputy Chief of the Indian General Staff; Commandant Staff College, Quetta; Brigade Major Peshawar Brigade; Deputy Chief of General Staff (Pakistan)
- Conflicts: World War I; North-West Frontier; Second Waziristan Campaign; Second Mohmand Campaign; World War II; South-East Asian theatre; Burma campaign; Third Arakan Campaign
- Awards: India General Service Medal (1909); Victory Medal (1914-1918); British War Medal (1914-1920); Military Cross Distinguished Service Order; Commander of the Most Excellent Order of the British Empire; Companion of The Most Honourable Order of the Bath (CB); 1939–1945 Star; Burma Star (1945); War Medal 1939–1945; Defence Medal 1939-1945
- Other work: Assistant Director Investigation Division at MAFF (UK); Historian Cabinet Office Official Histories of the Second World War

Major-General Henry Lowrie Davies CB CBE DSO MC (25 January 1898 – 6 July 1975) was a British Indian Army officer, who commanded the 25th Indian Division during the Second World War. Following the Partition of India, he briefly served as Deputy Chief of the General Staff of Pakistan before returning to the United Kingdom to work as a civil servant.

== Early life and military career ==
Davies was born in 1898, to a British Army officer. He was educated at Dover College and the Royal Military College, Sandhurst, before joining the 39th Garhwal Rifles (later the 18th Royal Garhwal Rifles) in India in 1916. He served with them in the Mesopotamian campaign of the First World War and as part of the "Army of the Black Sea" during the Turkish War of Independence. It was for 'distinguished service in the Field with the British Army of the Black Sea' that he was awarded the Military Cross as a captain with the 2/39th Garhwal Rifles.

Returning to British India, he was in service during operations in Waziristan in 1922–23. He attended the Staff College, Quetta from 1928 to 1929. After Quetta, he was then posted as a staff officer grade 3 (GSO.3) to Northern Command. He later became Brigade Major of the Peshawar Brigade, with whom he saw active service during the Mohmand campaign of 1933. It was for 'distinguished service rendered in the field in connection with the military operations against the Upper Mohmands, period July–October 1933' that he was mentioned in dispatches and awarded the Distinguished Service Order. He then returned to senior staff duties, as a GSO.2 at the Military Department of the India Office.

== Second World War ==
In the early stages of the Second World War, he was posted to operations in the North Atlantic as the GSO.1 of the force sent to occupy Iceland. However, he quickly returned to India in 1941, was appointed and Officer of the Order of the British Empire in the London Gazette of 1 July 1941, and in 1942 was appointed as a Brigadier on the General Staff of the Burma Army and Burma Corps. After heavy fighting in the Burma Campaign, the existing Burmese Army had been pushed back to the Indian border and effectively ceased to exist in May 1942. Davies was then appointed to command the newly created 25th Indian Infantry Division, forming in Bangalore to defend southern India against invasion. It trained for jungle operations through 1943, and was deployed during the Third Arakan Campaign in March 1944, pushing south along the Burmese coast. Davies relinquished command of the division in October 1944.

Davies resumed a staff position after leaving the division, appointed as the Deputy Chief of the Indian General Staff. He was appointed a Companion of the Bath as a temporary Major-General in the London Gazette of 13 September 1945. He was promoted to the substantive rank of Major-General with seniority of 15 November 1946 in the London Gazette of 1 April 1947. He then became commandant of the Staff College, Quetta, and following the partition of India transferred to the Pakistan Army as Deputy Chief of the General Staff. He retired the following year in 1948.

== Civil Service work ==
Returning to the United Kingdom, Davies joined the Ministry of Agriculture, Fisheries and Food, where he was assistant director of the investigation division. He remained at the Ministry for fourteen years, before moving to the Historical Section of the Cabinet Office, where he worked as a historian on the Official Histories of the Second World War. He finally retired in 1972.

== Bibliography ==
- Smart, Nick (2005). Biographical Dictionary of British Generals of the Second World War. Barnesley: Pen & Sword. ISBN 1844150496.

Military offices
Preceded by New post	GOC 25th Indian Infantry Division; 1942−1944	Succeeded by George Wood
Preceded by Stephen Fenemore Irwin	Commandant of the Staff College, Quetta; April−August 1947	Succeeded by Stephen Fenemore Irwin
