= Pando (application) =

Pando logo

Pando was an application which was mainly aimed at sending (and receiving) files which would normally be too large to send via more "conventional" means. It used both peer-to-peer (BitTorrent protocol) and client-server architectures and was released for Windows and Mac OS X operating systems.

Pando shut down its servers and ceased business on August 31, 2013.

As of February 24, 2014, the Pando Media Booster had been hijacked, and unsuspecting persons who installed a prompted update had their web browsers hijacked, and a virus called the "Sweet Page" browser virus was installed on their computers.

== Details ==
Pando functioned as a normal BitTorrent client and used the BitTorrent protocol to transfer files.

Using Pando was very similar to using any BitTorrent client. A Pando upload began with meta-data stored within a file with a .pando filename extension. Also like BitTorrent, this file could be sent via e-mail or published on a website or exchanged with the recipient in some other way (such as via IM). And, like BitTorrent, the downloader had to first install the Pando software.

Pando used a 256-bit end-to-end encryption method to secure communication among peers.

The primary difference from traditional BitTorrent file transfer operations was that a copy of the shared file was uploaded to Pando's servers and remained there for a limited time, seeding it. In this way, the file remained available even after the original sender went offline.

== Features ==
A non-subscription version was ad-supported; i.e. it offered to install the SmartShopper malware on the computers of its users. A subscription version extended the capabilities. Beyond the features listed below, there were additional service offerings for high-volume publishers and subscription content delivery.

Its common features were:

- Server-assisted delivery provided increased file availability and delivery speeds. (Subscribers received faster server-assisted speeds.)
- Seven days, or thirty days, of file retention on Pando's servers, depending on how users shared. (Subscriptions doubled these retention times to fourteen days or sixty days.)
- Statistics about number and time of downloads were provided to the sender.
- It was fully supported client software for both the Windows and the Mac OS X operating systems.
- An assortment of software could be added-on to popular web browsers, instant messaging, or e-mail clients.
- Users were allowed an unlimited number of uploads.
- The maximum file size that could be so transferred by non-subscribers was 1 GB; this was increased to 3 GB with subscriptions.

== Pando Media Booster ==
The Pando Media Booster (PMB) was an application by Pando Networks that publishers of games and software could employ to ensure safe, complete and speedy downloads of large files. PMB was primarily used to download MMORPGs. Users of PMB participated in a secure, closed peer-to-peer network where users received pieces of the download package from a Content Delivery Network (CDN) as well as "peers, or other active users. PMB was usually packaged and automatically uploaded to a PC without the knowledge of the user. Many times, users would experience drastically slower downloads of these MMORPGs while PMB was being installed. Unlike Pando, PMB could not be used to send files from the user's computer. PMB was only activated to deliver Pando-enabled downloads from commercial sources such as TV networks, software publishers and gaming companies.

== Conflicts ==
The Pando Media Booster (PMB.exe) listened on TCP ports 443 and 563. People who were having trouble getting web servers such as Apache, IIS, or others to work were advised to consider removing the Pando Media Booster.

The Pando Media Booster ran at system startup and took priority to other downloads. Slower-than-normal downloading speeds or general network performance issues might be related to the product.

These conflicts ceased to be reported in 2013, when Pando shut down its servers and ceased business. But after 2014, when the Pando Media Browser was hijacked, unsuspecting persons who installed a prompted update instead had their internet browsers hijacked and the "Sweet Page" browser virus installed.

== See also ==
- Cloud storage
- Comparison of file hosting services
- DropSend
- SendThisFile
- WeTransfer
