= 25th Infantry Division (India) =

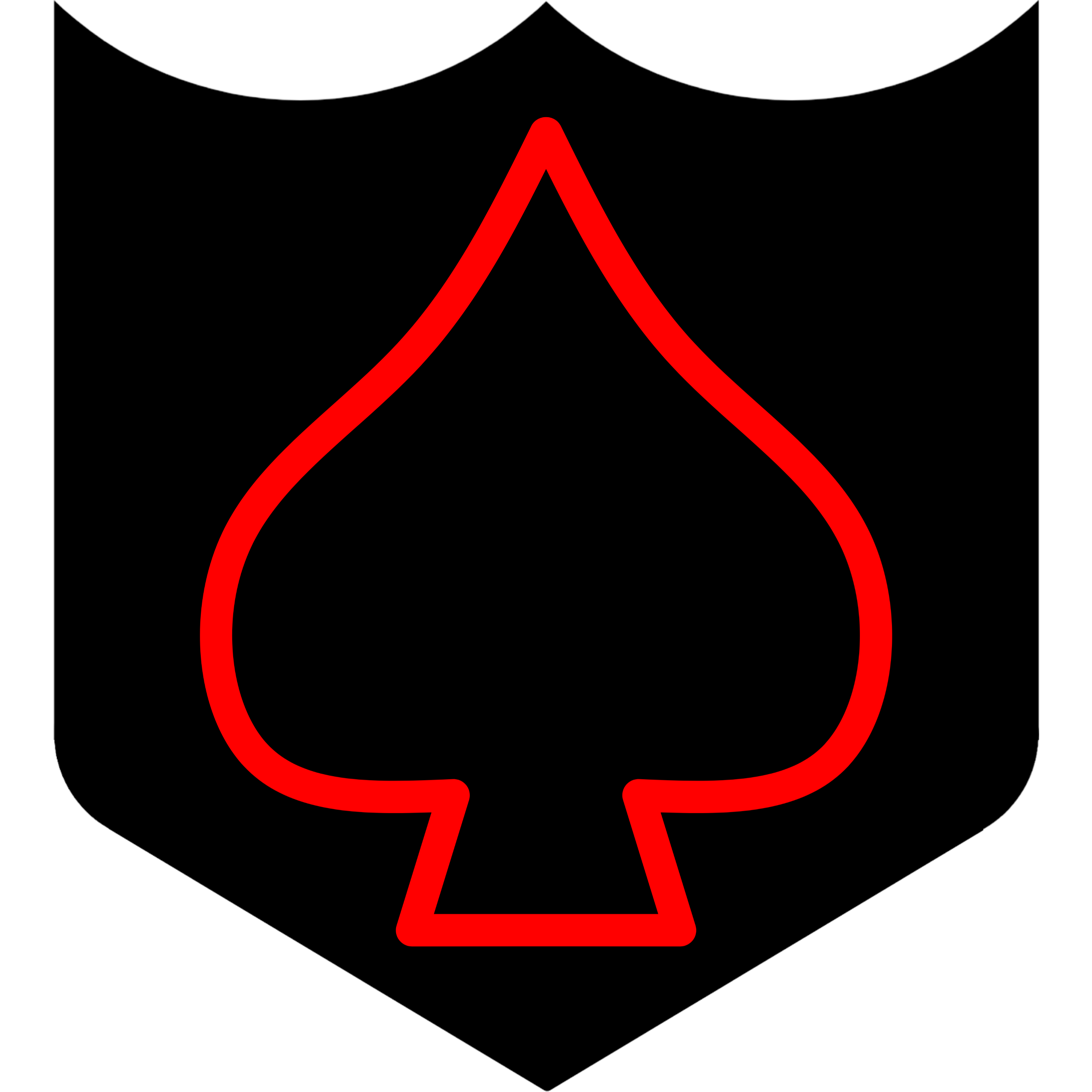
- Formation sign of the 25th Infantry Division.
- Active: 1942–1946; 1948–present
- Country: (British Raj) British India; India
- Allegiance: India
- Branch: British Indian Army; Indian Army
- Type: Infantry
- Size: Division
- Garrison/HQ: Rajouri

Insignia
- Identification symbol: Ace of Spades

The 25th Infantry Division is an infantry division of the Indian Army which was raised during the World War II and fought in the Burma Campaign. It was re-raised within the post-independence Indian Army in 1948.

== History ==
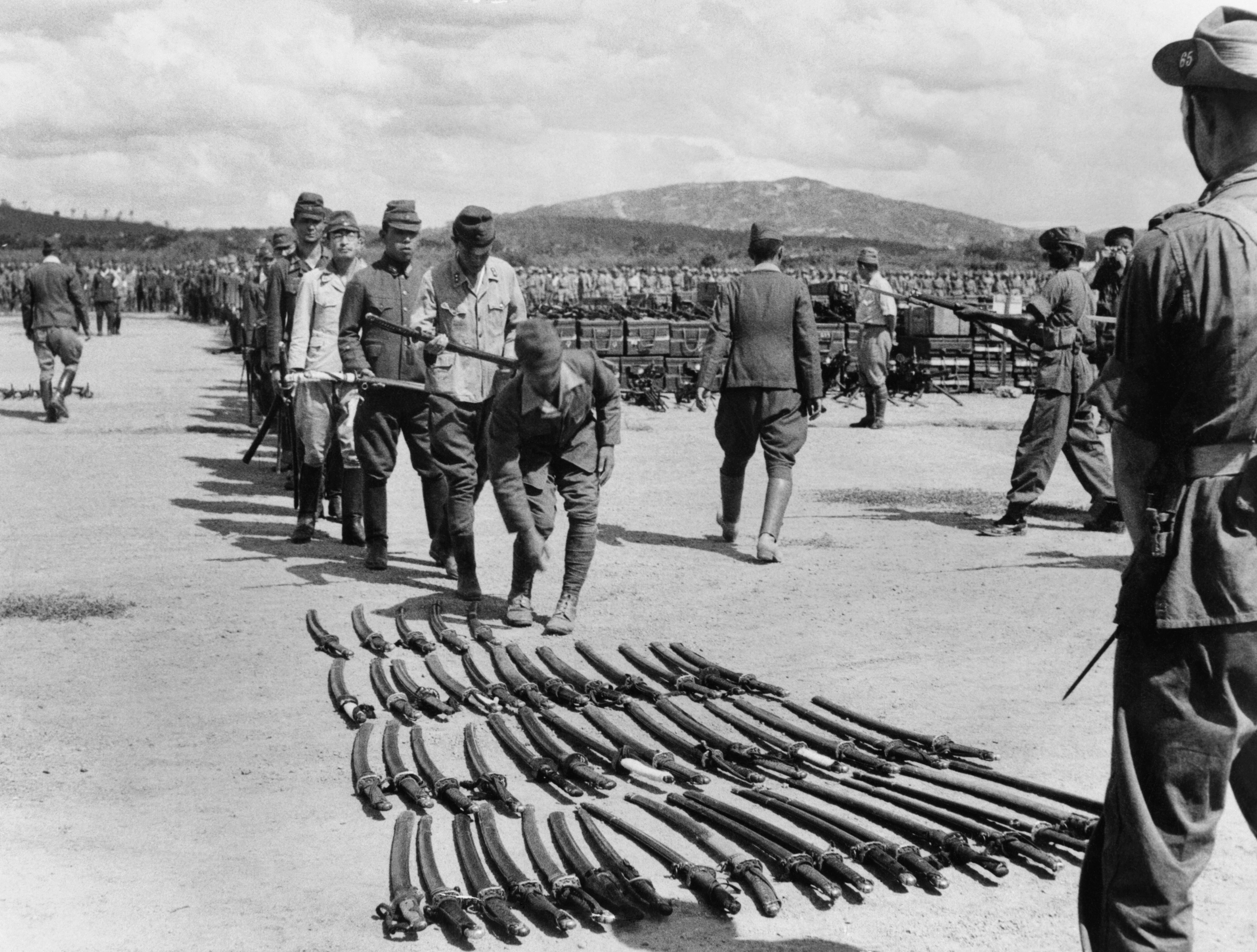
A long line of Japanese officers wait to surrender their swords to the 25th Indian Division in Kuala Lumpur, 1945.

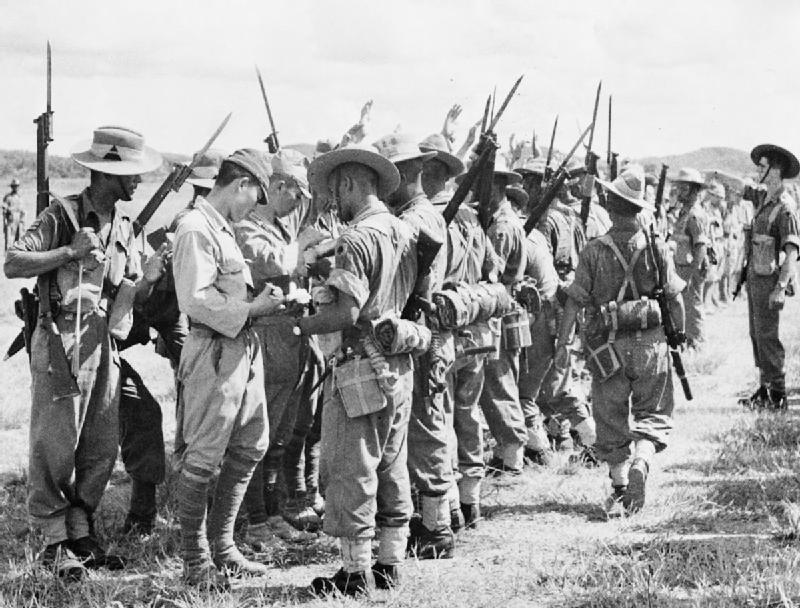
The 25th Indian Division search Japanese prisoners soon after they have been disarmed in Kuala Lumpur.

Originally formed in Bangalore in South India on 1 August 1942 under Major-General Henry Davies the Division was disbanded at the end of World War II.

The division's original role as conceived by Army Commander General Sir W. J. Slim was to meet any attempted Japanese invasion while at the same time training actively for jungle warfare. It first saw action, having become part of Indian XV Corps, at the onset of the third Arakan Campaign in March 1944 where it held and enlarged the Maungdaw Base and established superiority over the enemy.

In May 1944 command of the division was assumed by Major-General George Wood, previously commanding British 4th Infantry Brigade in India. In November 1944, supported by destroyers of the Royal Australian Navy, the division cleared the Mayu Range down to Foul Point and occupied Akyab Island. Following this, with 3 Commando Brigade under command, it made a series of successful seaborne attacks down the coast, supported by sloops of the Royal Indian Navy and winning four Victoria Crosses in the process. These actions included the decisive Battle of Kangaw and landings at Myebon and Ruywa to intercept the retreating Japanese.

In April 1945 the division was withdrawn to South India to prepare for 'Operation Zipper', the invasion of British Malaya, having been chosen for the assault landing (amphibious) role. Although hostilities then ceased, the operation proceeded as planned and 25th Division was the first formation to land in Malaya, occupying the capital, Kuala Lumpur, and then accepting the surrender of the Japanese Army. The division was disbanded in Malaya in February and March 1946.

=== Post-independence ===
The division was re-raised within the post-independence Indian Army in 1948. In October 1962 the division was under XV Corps in the Army's Western Command. Its headquarters were at Poonch, and it included the 80th, 93rd and 120th Infantry Brigades.

== Composition During World War II ==
- 19th King George's Own Lancers (Divisional Reconnaissance Regiment)
- Commander, Royal Artillery:
  - Brigadier G.H. Johnstone (August 1942 - June 1943)
  - Brigadier A.G. O'C. Scott (June 1943 - August 1944)
  - Brigadier A.J. Daniell (August 1944 - April 1945)
  - Brigadier Nigel Tapp (April 1945 - 1946)
  - HQ
  - 8th & 27th Field Regts, Royal Artillery
  - 5th Indian Field Regt Indian Artillery
  - 33 Indian Mountain Regt IA
  - 7 Indian Anti-Tank Regt IA
- Indian Engineers: Sappers & Miners
  - 63rd & 425th Field Coys Q.V.O. Madras
  - 93rd FD Company Royal Bombay
  - 325th FD Park Coy Q.V.O. Madras
- 25th Indian Div Signals
- 7th Battalion, 16th Punjab Regiment

=== 51st Indian Infantry Brigade ===
Commanders:

- Brigadier T.H. Angus ( - Nov 1944)
- Brigadier R.A. Hutton (May 1944 - )
  - HQ
  - 8th Battalion, York and Lancaster Regiment (until October 1944)
  - 2nd Battalion, 2nd Punjab Regiment (from September 1944)
  - 16th Battalion, 10th Baluch Regiment
  - 17th Battalion, 5th Mahratta Light Infantry (until March 1945)
  - 8th Battalion, 19th Hyderabad Regiment (from March 1944)

=== 53rd Indian Infantry Brigade ===
Commanders:

- Brigadier G.A.P. Coldstream (to August 1944)
- Brigadier A.G.O'C. Scott (August 1944 to December 1944)
- Brigadier B.C.H. Gerty (from December 1944)
  - HQ
  - 9th Battalion, York and Lancaster Regiment
  - 17th Battalion, 5th Mahratta Light Infantry
  - 9th Battalion, 9th Jat Regiment
  - 4th Battalion, 18th Royal Garhwal Rifles

=== 74th Indian Infantry Brigade ===
Commanders:

- Brigadier J.E. Hirst (to March 1945)
- Brigadier J.C.W. Cargill (from March 1945)
  - HQ
  - 6th Battalion, Oxfordshire and Buckinghamshire Light Infantry
  - 14th Battalion, 10th Baluch Regiment
  - 3rd Battalion, 2nd King Edward VII's Own Gurkha Rifles (The Sirmoor Rifles)

=== 3rd Commando Brigade ===
Commanders:

- Brigadier
  - HQ
  - No. 44 (Royal Marine) Commando
  - No. 42 (Royal Marine) Commando
  - No. 1 Army Commando
  - No. 5 Army Commando

=== Support Units ===
- Royal Indian Army Service Corps
  - 18th, 39th and 59th Animal Transport Coys (Mules)
  - 68th, 81st and 101st Gp Tpt Coys
  - Comp Supply Units
  - Inland Water Tpt
- Medical Services
  - I.M.S-R.A.M.C-I.M.D-I.H.C-I.A.M.C
  - 51st, 52nd, 53rd and 56th Indian Field Ambulances
- 25th Indian Div Provost Unit
- Indian Army Ordnance Corps
  - 125th Ordnance sub-Park
- Indian Electrical & Mechanical Engineers
  - 76th, 77th & 78th Infantry Workshop Companies
  - 25th Indian Div Recovery Company

== Assigned brigades ==
All these brigades were assigned or attached to the division at some time during World War II

- 51st Indian Infantry Brigade
- 53rd Indian Infantry Brigade
- 74th Indian Infantry Brigade
- 22nd (East Africa) Infantry Brigade
- 3 Commando Brigade
- 2nd (West Africa) Infantry Brigade

== Sources ==
- Cole, Howard (1973). Formation Badges of World War 2. Britain, Commonwealth and Empire. London: Arms and Armour Press.
- Mason, Philip (1982-06-09). The Indian Divisions Memorial, 1939-1945, Royal Military Academy Sandhurst. Wellingborough: Skeltons Press.
- Yeats-Brown, F (1945). Martial India. London: Eyre and Spottiswoode.
- "Orders of Battle.com". Archived from the original on 17 July 2007.
- Houterman, Hans; Koppes, Jeroen. "World War II unit histories and officers". Archived from the original on 26 June 2007.
