= DropSend =

DropSend is a software tool that allows users to send large files as though by email, through a small desktop client. DropSend has been available since at least November 25, 2005. It is available for Windows and Mac OS X. The service can send files of up to 8GB in size, and is available with 256bit AES Security.

On November 4, 2006, the parent company, Carson Systems, expressed an interest in selling its DropSend operations. Flock is also reported to have expressed an interest in acquiring it. Later, in 2008, Ryan Carson announced via Twitter that DropSend had been sold, though he did not specify to whom.

== About ==
DropSend offers file sharing and storage for individuals. There is a free plan, which includes up to 5 file sends a month and 250 MB/2 GB of storage space, and a number of paid plans which include more sends and storage space.

DropSend is an application to send large files (up to 8GB) to other people without being restricted by email attachment sizes. With DropSend you upload a file online and the receiver gets an email with a download link.

It also offers a mobile app for Android and Apple devices. Share files and manage your storage right from your iOS or Android device. With DropSend Mobile App, you can upload files to your storage and send them, access your Inbox, review sent items and manage your account.

== See also ==
- Cloud storage
- Comparison of file hosting services
- Pando (application)
- SendThisFile
- WeTransfer
