= 33rd Indian Mountain Regiment, Royal Indian Artillery =

33rd Indian Mountain Regiment, RIA
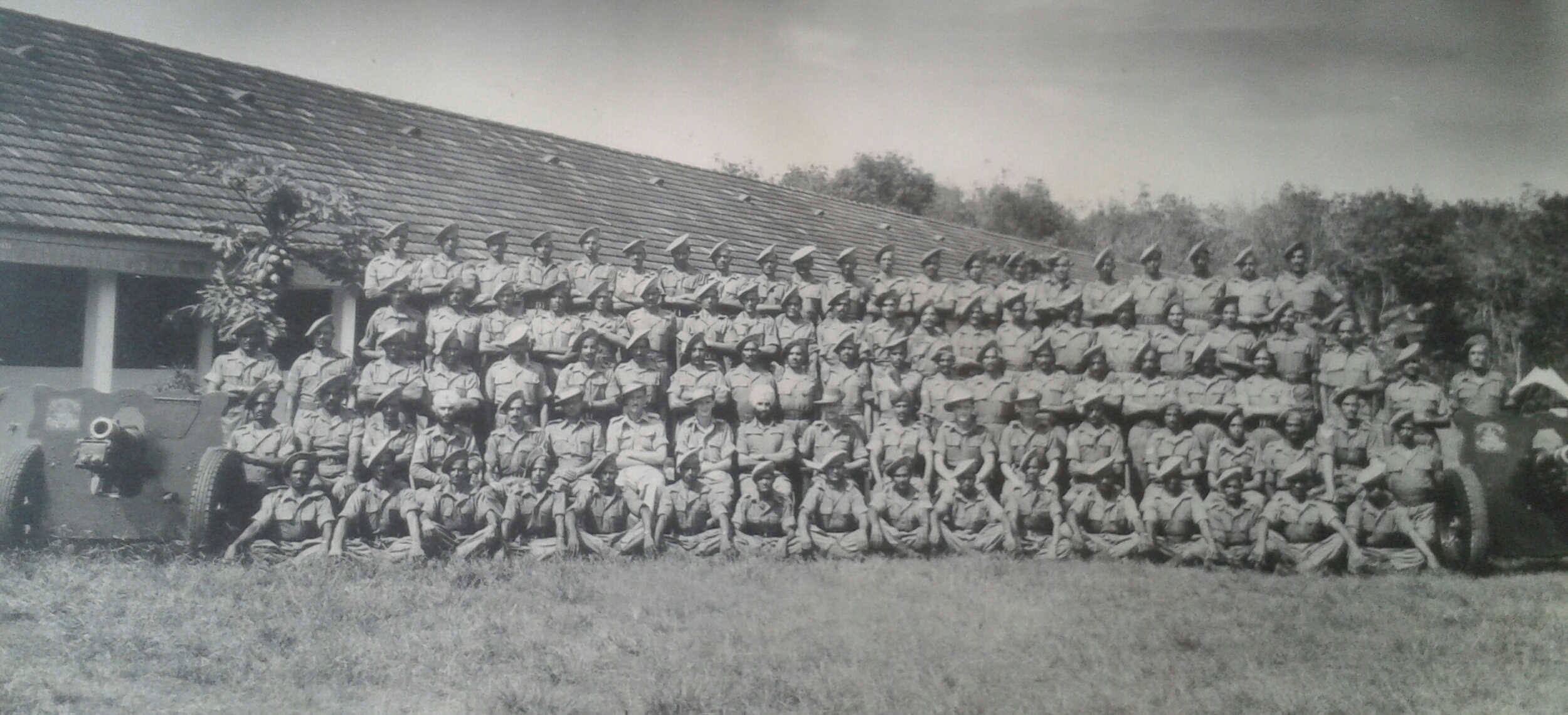
- The regiment photographed in Tanjung Rambutan in 1945.
- Active: 1944–1946
- Country: (British Raj) Indian Empire
- Branch: British Indian Army
- Type: Artillery
- Part of: 25th Indian Infantry Division
- Engagements: Burma Campaign

Commanders
- Notable commanders: Lieutenant-Colonel R. Ellis

The 33rd Indian Mountain Regiment, Royal Indian Artillery was an artillery regiment of the Indian Army during World War II, which fought in the Burma Campaign and South-East Asia.

== Service ==
The 33rd Mountain Regiment was formed in September 1944 by amalgamating the 34th Battery of the 30th Mountain Regiment and the 19th (Maymyo) Battery. It was initially under the command of Lieutenant-Colonel R. Ellis and garrisoned at Ambala Cantonment. The regiment primarily comprised Sikh, Ahir and Punjabi native soldiers and British officers, and was equipped with the QF 3.7-inch mountain howitzer transported by mules. It was attached to the 25th Indian Infantry Division from its inception and by October 1944, it was participating in the Arakan Campaign. For much of the campaign, the regiment was understrength and was consequently directly attached to brigades in a support role rather than acting as divisional artillery.

In late 1944, the 33rd Mountain Regiment was attached to the 53rd Indian Infantry Brigade. It was trained for an amphibious assault on the north-west corner of the Akyab peninsular, to be followed by the capture of Akyab from the landward side. In December 1944, the regiment was involved in the capture of Kudaung island to the north of Akyab, using rafts to travel down the Kaladan River and landing on the banks to engage the Japanese. While crossing at Kwazu on 29 December 1944, a raft containing a sub-section of 34th Battery overturned and thirteen Indian soldiers drowned. The howitzers of the regiment were engaged in the successful capture of Akyab on 4 January 1945 and the capture of Myebon on 18 January. The 25th Division was then transferred to India, with the 33rd Mountain Regiment arriving in Madras in May 1945. Here the regiment was made up to strength with the addition of the 35th Indian Mountain Battery.

In August 1945, the regiment left India and participated in Operation Zipper. It entered Kuala Lumpur in Christmas 1945 where the regiment was mustered out, with the regiment's Ahirs going to 2nd Mountain Regiment and the Punjabi Muslims to 23rd Mountain Regiment.
