= 51st Indian Infantry Brigade =

- Active: December 1941 – May 1946
- Country: British India
- Allegiance: British Crown
- Branch: British Indian Army
- Type: Infantry
- Size: Brigade
- Part of: 25th Indian Division
- Engagements: Second World War Burma Campaign Arakan 1944–45

Commanders
- Notable commanders: Brig. R.A. Hutton; Lt Col K.S. Thimayya

The 51st Indian Infantry Brigade was an infantry brigade of the British Indian Army that saw active service in the Indian Army during the Second World War. It took part in the Arakan Campaign and in the immediate post-war period reoccupied Malaya.

== History ==
The 51st Indian Infantry Brigade was formed in December 1941, in India, and initially assigned to HQ Rawalpindi District. It was transferred to the 20th Indian Infantry Division in April 1942, and transferred again in August 1942 to the 25th Indian Infantry Division where it remained until the end of the war.

The brigade moved to the Arakan in March 1944 where it remained until April 1945 before returning to India. It took part in actions at Mayu Peninsula, at Kangaw and at Tamandu.

At the end of the war, it took part in Operation Zipper, landing in Malaya on 9 September 1945 and reaching Kuala Lumpur by 13 September. It remained in Malaya with 25th Division until February 1946 then returned to India where it was disbanded in May.

== Order of battle ==
The following units served with the brigade during and after the Second World War:

- 17th Battalion, 5th Mahratta Light Infantry (December 1941 to March 1944)
- 8th Battalion, 19th Hyderabad Regiment (December 1941 to July 1942 and March 1944 to April 1946) (Note: 8th Battalion, 19th Hyderabad Regiment was redesignated as 4th Battalion, Kumaon Regiment on 16 April 1945.)
- 16th Battalion, 10th Baluch Regiment (May 1942 to March 1946)
- 8th Battalion, York and Lancaster Regiment (August 1942 to October 1944)
- 2nd Battalion, 2nd Punjab Regiment (September 1944 to March 1945 and September 1945 to February 1946)
- 51 Brigade Signal Section
- 51 Brigade Workshop Section, IAOC (1942 to 1943)
- 51 LAD Type E/F, IEME (1943 onwards) (Note: 51 Brigade Workshop Section, IAOC was redesignated 51 LAD Type E/F, IEME in 1943.)
- 75 Field Post Office (August 1942 to March 1946)

== Commanders ==
The brigade had the following commanders in the Second World War:

From	Rank	Name	Notes
7 April 1942	Brigadier	T.H. Angus DSO MC	
6 November 1944	Brigadier	R.A. Hutton DSO OBE	
11 December 1944	Lt. Col.	K.S. Thimayya	acting (from 8th Battalion, 19th Hyderabad Regiment)
13 January 1945	Brigadier	R.A. Hutton DSO OBE	
22 September 1945	Brigadier	J.M.K. Bradford DSO	
20 January 1946	Brigadier	R.A. Hutton DSO OBE	

2014-2016 Brigadier J.S. Yadav, VSM

== See also ==
- List of Indian Army Brigades in World War II

== Bibliography ==
- Kempton, Chris (2003b). 'Loyalty & Honour', The Indian Army September 1939 – August 1947. Vol. Part II Brigades. Milton Keynes: The Military Press. ISBN 0-85420-238-2.
