= Richard O'Connor =

British Army general (1889–1981)

General Sir Richard O'Connor KT GCB DSO & Bar MC
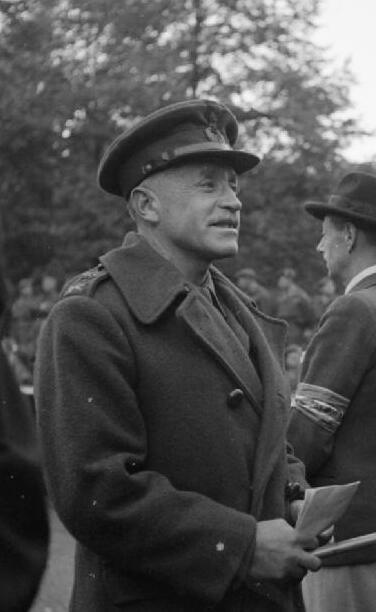
- Born: 21 August 1889; Srinagar, British India
- Died: 17 June 1981 (aged 91); King Edward VII's Hospital, London, England
- Military career
- Allegiance: United Kingdom
- Branch: British Army
- Service years: 1908–1948
- Rank: General
- Service number: 936
- Unit: Cameronians (Scottish Rifles)
- Commands: Northern Command, India (1945–1946); Eastern Command, India (1945); VIII Corps (1944); British Troops in Egypt (1941); XIII Corps (1941); Western Desert Force (1940–1941); 6th Infantry Division (1939–1940); 7th Infantry Division (1938–1939); Peshawar Brigade (1936–1938); 2nd Infantry Battalion, Honourable Artillery Company (1917–1919)
- Conflicts: First World War; Arab revolt in Palestine; Second World War
- Awards: Knight of the Order of the Thistle; Knight Grand Cross of the Order of the Bath; Companion of the Distinguished Service Order & Bar; Military Cross; Mentioned in despatches (13); Legion of Honour (France); Croix de Guerre (France); Silver Medal of Military Valor (Italy)
- Other work: Commandant of the Army Cadet Force, Scotland; Colonel of the Cameronians; Lord Lieutenant of Ross and Cromarty; Lord High Commissioner to the General Assembly of the Church of Scotland

General Sir Richard Nugent O'Connor (21 August 1889 – 17 June 1981) was a senior British Army officer who fought in both the First and Second World Wars, and commanded the Western Desert Force in the early years of the Second World War. He was the field commander for Operation Compass, in which his forces destroyed a much larger Italian army – a victory which nearly drove the Axis from Africa, and in turn, led Adolf Hitler to send the Afrika Korps under Erwin Rommel to try to reverse the situation. O'Connor was captured by a German patrol on 6 April 1941 and spent over two years in an Italian prisoner of war camp. He eventually escaped after the fall of Mussolini in the autumn of 1943. In 1944 he commanded VIII Corps in the Battle of Normandy and later during Operation Market Garden. In 1945 he was General Officer in Command of the Eastern Command in India and then, in the closing days of British rule in the subcontinent, he headed Northern Command. His final job in the army was Adjutant-General to the Forces in London, in charge of the British Army's administration, personnel and organisation.

In honour of his war service, O'Connor was recognised with the highest level of knighthood in two different orders of chivalry. He was appointed a Companion of the Distinguished Service Order (with Bar); awarded the Military Cross, the French Croix de Guerre and the Legion of Honour; and served as aide-de-camp to King George VI. He was also mentioned in despatches nine times for actions in the First World War, once in Palestine in 1939 and three times in the Second World War.

== Early life ==
Richard Nugent O'Connor was born in Srinagar, Kashmir, India, on 21 August 1889. His father, Maurice O'Connor, was a major in the Royal Irish Fusiliers, and his mother, Lilian Morris, was the daughter of a former governor of India's central provinces. He attended Tonbridge Castle School in 1899 and The Towers School in Crowthorne in 1902. In 1903, aged 13, and after his father's death in an accident, he moved to Wellington College. "His career there was not distinguished in any way", however, although he enjoyed his time there.

Following this, he went to the Royal Military College at Sandhurst in January 1908. Despite his success in later life, his time there, as at Wellington (only a few miles away from Sandhurst), was not remarkable, and he did not mention his time there even in his later life. A year ahead of him at the college was a man who would play a significant role in O'Connor's future military career and life. This was Bernard Montgomery, about two years older than O'Connor, although it is unknown if the two men knew of each other at this very early stage of their military careers.

Passing out 38th in the order of merit, in September of the following year O'Connor, anxious to join a Scottish regiment, was commissioned, as a second lieutenant and posted to the 2nd Battalion of his new regiment, Cameronians (Scottish Rifles), the regiment of his choice, recruiting from Glasgow and Lanarkshire, and with which he was to maintain close ties with for the rest of his life. The battalion was initially stationed in Aldershot when O'Connor joined them in October 1909 before being rotated, in January 1910, to Colchester. It was here where he received signals and rifle training, after attending courses for both, resulting in his being appointed a regimental signals officer for the former, and becoming a distinguished marksman after attending the Small Arms School at Hythe, Kent. In September 1911 the battalion sailed for Malta where it was to remain for the next three years as part of a Malta brigade, with O'Connor, now a lieutenant (having been promoted to that rank in May), continuing in his role as regimental signals officer. By now it was becoming obvious that a war in Europe was on the horizon. As a result, for O'Connor, who at some point was appointed the Malta brigade's signals officer, the years of 1913 and 1914 were spent in training the men under his command for the duties that they would one day have to perform in battle.

== First World War ==
During the First World War, O'Connor initially served as signals officer of the 22nd Brigade in the 7th Division and captain in command of the 7th Division's Signals Company. From October 1916, as a captain and later as a brevet major, he served as brigade major of 91st Brigade, 7th Division. He was awarded the Military Cross (MC) in February 1915. In March of that year he saw action at Arras and Bullecourt. O'Connor was appointed a Companion of the Distinguished Service Order (DSO) and appointed brevet lieutenant-colonel while he was in command of the 2nd Infantry Battalion of the Honourable Artillery Company, part of the 7th Division, in June 1917. The citation for his DSO reads:

For conspicuous gallantry and resource. In consequence of a change in the situation a revision of plans became necessary, but, owing to darkness and heavy shelling, confusion arose. By his courage and promptness he quickly restored order, and organised a successful attack.

In November of that year, the division was ordered to support the Italians against the Austro-Hungarian forces at the River Piave which then formed part of the Italian Front. In late October 1918 the 2nd Battalion captured the island of Grave di Papadopoli on the Piave River for which O'Connor received the Italian Silver Medal of Military Valor and a Bar to his DSO.

At the end of the war, O'Connor reverted to his rank of captain and served as regimental adjutant from April to December 1919.

== Between the wars ==
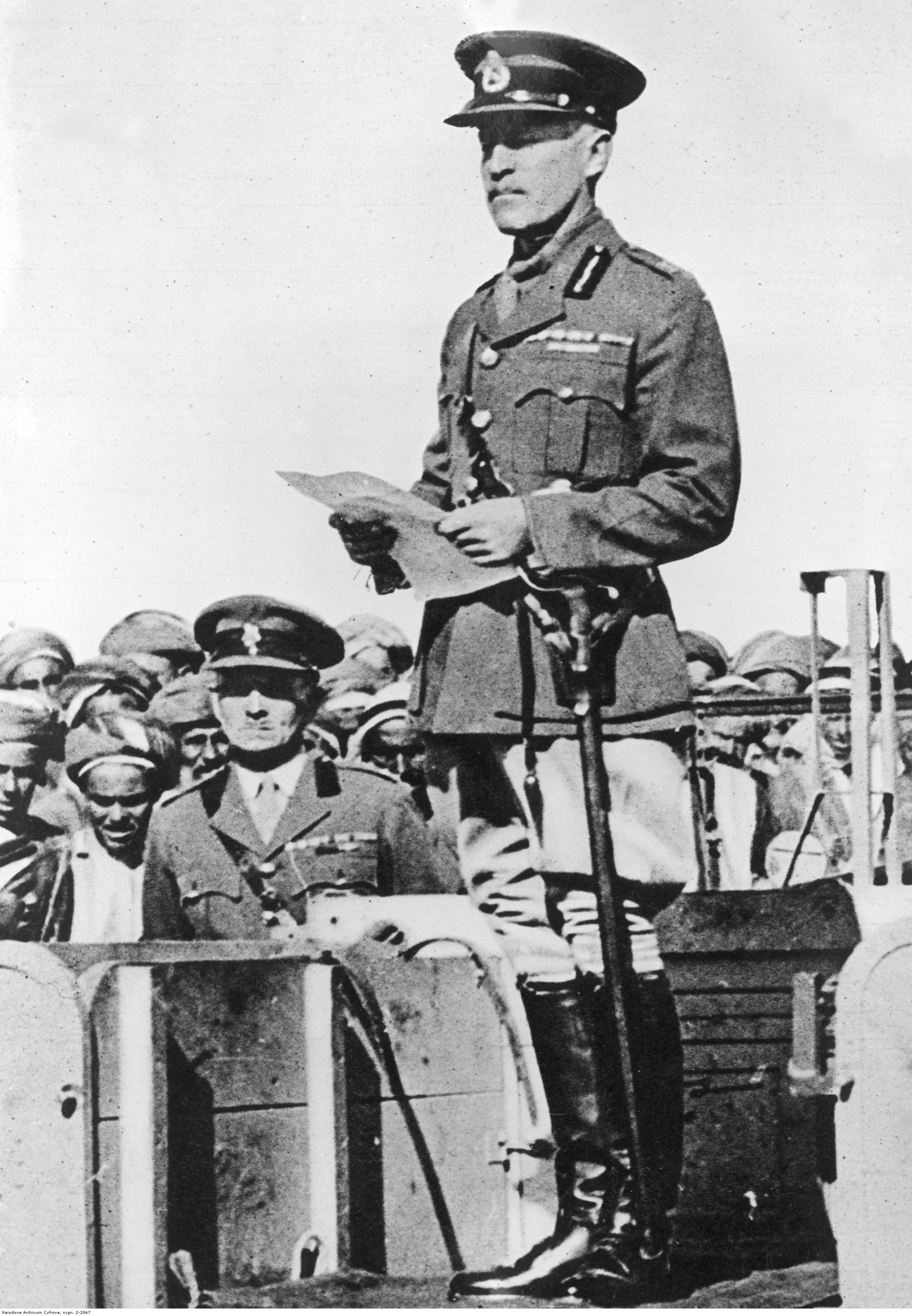
O'Connor in Yatta, Mandatory Palestine, December 1938

O'Connor attended the Staff College, Camberley in 1920. O'Connor's other service in the years between the world wars included an appointment from 1921 to 1924 as brigade major of the Experimental Brigade (or 5 Brigade) under the command of J. F. C. Fuller, which was formed to test methods and procedures for using tanks and aircraft in co-ordination with infantry and artillery.

He returned to his old unit, the Cameronians (Scottish Rifles), as adjutant from February 1924 to 1925. From 1925 to 1927 he served as a company commander at Sandhurst. He returned to the Staff College, Camberley as an instructor from October 1927 to January 1930. In 1930 O'Connor again served with the 1st Battalion, Cameronians (Scottish Rifles) in Egypt and from 1931 to 1932 in Lucknow, India. From April 1932 to January 1935 he was a general staff officer, grade 2 at the War Office. He attended the Imperial Defence College in London in 1935. In April 1936 O'Connor was promoted to full colonel and appointed temporary brigadier to assume command of the Peshawar Brigade in north west India. In September 1938 O'Connor was promoted to major-general and appointed general officer commanding 7th Infantry Division in Palestine, along with the additional responsibility as Military Governor of Jerusalem. For his services in Palestine O'Connor was mentioned in despatches.

In August 1939, shortly before the outbreak of the Second World War, the 7th Division was transferred to the fortress at Mersa Matruh, Egypt, where O'Connor was concerned with defending the area against a potential attack from the massed forces of the Italian Tenth Army over the border in Libya. The 7th Division later converted to become the 6th Division in November 1939. He was appointed a Companion of the Order of the Bath in July 1940.

== Second World War ==
=== Italian Offensive and Operation Compass ===
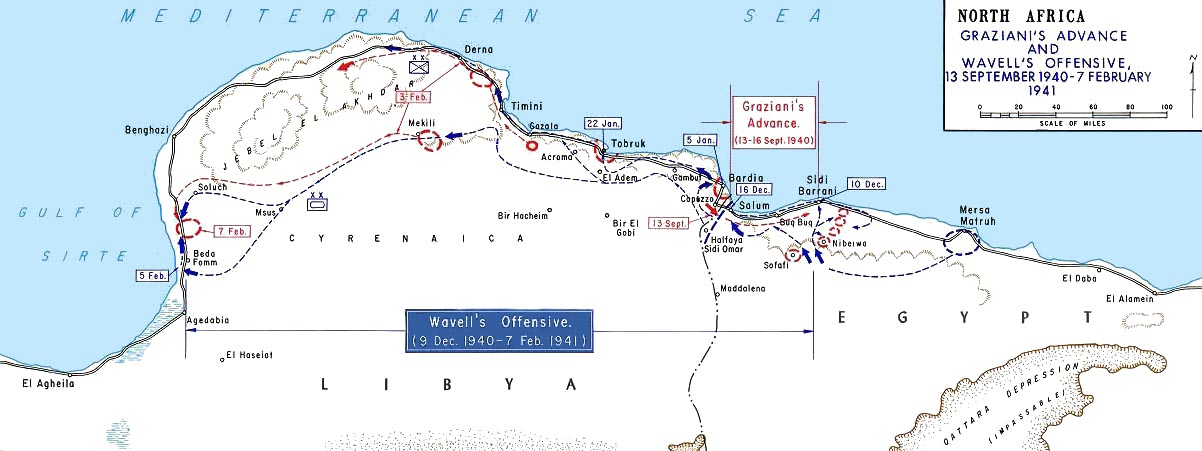
The Italian Offensive and Operation Compass 13 September 1940 – 7 February 1941 (Click to enlarge).

Italy declared war on Britain and France on 10 June 1940 and, soon after, O'Connor was appointed commander of the Western Desert Force. He was tasked by Lieutenant-general Henry Maitland Wilson, commander of the British troops in Egypt, to push the Italian force out of Egypt, to protect the Suez Canal and British interests from attack.

On 13 September, Graziani struck: his leading divisions advanced sixty miles into Egypt where they reached the town of Sidi Barrani and, short of supplies, began to dig in. O'Connor then began to prepare for a counterattack. He had the 7th Armoured Division and the Indian 4th Infantry Division along with two brigades. British and Commonwealth troops in Egypt totalled around 36,000 men. The Italians had nearly five times as many troops along with hundreds more tanks and artillery pieces and the support of a much larger air force, albeit most of the Italian tank force comprised obsolete tankettes. Meanwhile, small raiding columns were sent out from the 7th Armoured and newly formed Long Range Desert Group to probe, harass, and disrupt the Italians (this marked the start of what became the Special Air Service). The Royal Navy and Royal Air Force supported by bombarding enemy strongpoints, airfields and rear areas.

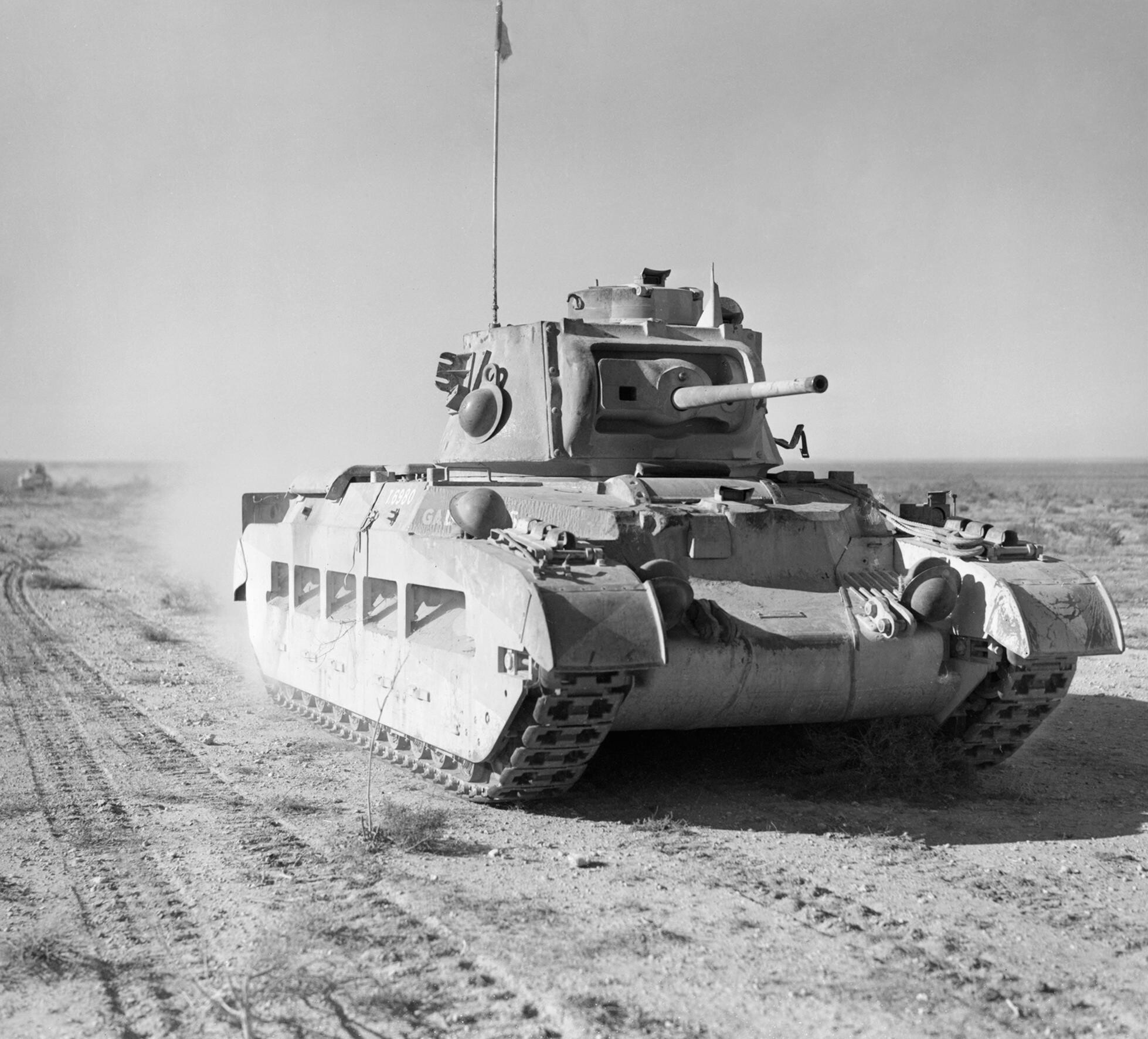
A Matilda tank advances through Egypt as part of Operation Compass.

During November, O'Connor was appointed an acting lieutenant-general in recognition of the increased size of his command.

The counteroffensive, Operation Compass, began on 8 December 1940. O'Connor's relatively small force of 31,000 men, 275 tanks and 120 artillery pieces, ably supported by an RAF wing and the Royal Navy, broke through a gap in the Italian defences at Sidi Barrani near the coast. The Desert Force cut a swath through the Italian rear areas, stitching its way between the desert and the coast, capturing strongpoint after strongpoint by cutting off and isolating them. The Italian guns proved to be no match for the heavy British Matilda tanks and their shells bounced off the armour. By mid-December the Italians had been pushed completely out of Egypt, leaving behind 38,000 prisoners and large stores of equipment.

The Desert Force paused to rest briefly before continuing the assault into Italian Libya against the remainder of Graziani's disorganised army. At that point, the Commander-in-Chief Middle East General Sir Archibald Wavell ordered the 4th Indian Division withdrawn to spearhead the invasion of Italian East Africa. This veteran division was to be replaced by the inexperienced 6th Australian Division, which, although tough, was untrained for desert warfare. Despite this setback, the offensive continued with minimal delay. By the end of December the Australians besieged and took Bardia along with 40,000 more prisoners and 400 guns.

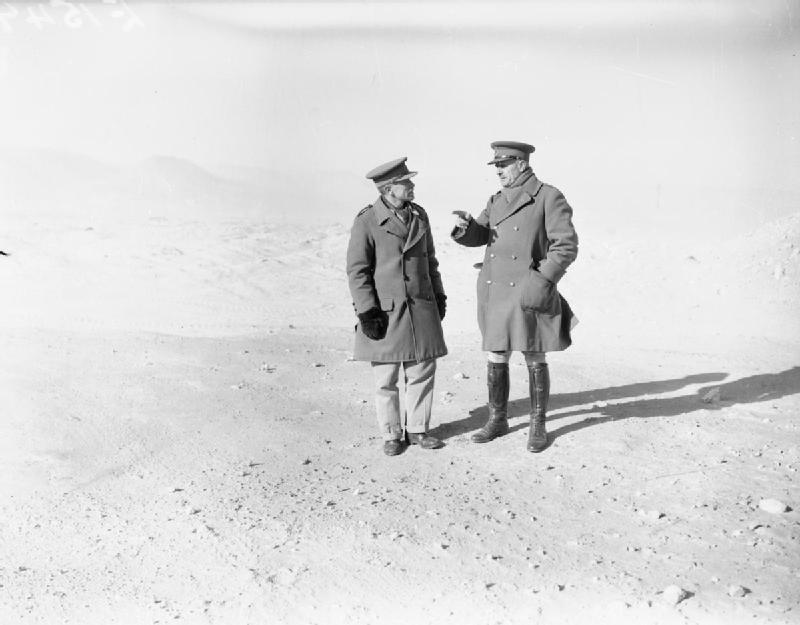
O'Connor with Wavell during the assault on Bardia.

In early January 1941, the Western Desert Force was redesignated XIII Corps. On 9 January, the offensive resumed. By 12 January the strategic fortress port of Tobruk was surrounded. On 22 January it fell and another 27,000 Italian POWs were taken along with valuable supplies, food, and weapons. As Tobruk fell it was decided to have XIII Corps answerable directly to Wavell at HQ Middle East Command, removing HQ British troops Egypt from the chain of command. On 26 January the remaining Italian divisions in eastern Libya began to retreat to the northwest along the coast. O'Connor promptly moved to pursue and cut them off, sending his armour southwest through the desert in a wide flanking movement, while the infantry gave chase along the coast to the north. The lightly armoured advance units of 4th Armoured Brigade arrived at Beda Fomm before the fleeing Italians on 5 February, blocking the main coast road and their route of escape. Two days later, after a costly and failed attempt to break through the blockade, and with the main British infantry force fast bearing down on them from Benghazi to the north, the demoralised, exhausted Italians unconditionally capitulated. O'Connor and Eric Dorman-Smith cabled back to Wavell, "Fox killed in the open..."

In two months, the XIII Corps/Western Desert Force had advanced over 800 miles (1,300 km), destroyed an entire Italian army of ten divisions, taken over 130,000 prisoners, 400 tanks and 1,292 guns at the cost of 500 killed and 1,373 wounded. In recognition of this, O'Connor was made a Knight Commander of the Order of the Bath.

=== Reversal and capture ===
In a strategic sense, however, the victory of Operation Compass was not yet complete; the Italians still controlled most of Libya and possessed forces which would have to be dealt with. The Axis foothold in North Africa would remain a potential threat to Egypt and the Suez Canal so long as this situation continued. O'Connor was aware of this and urged Wavell to allow him to push on to Tripoli with all due haste to finish off the Italians. Wavell concurred as did Lieutenant-general Sir Henry Maitland Wilson, now the military governor of Cyrenaica, and XIII Corps resumed its advance. However, O'Connor's new offensive would prove short-lived: when the corps reached El Agheila, just to the southwest of Beda Fomm, Churchill ordered the advance to halt there. The Axis had invaded Greece and Wavell was ordered to send all available forces there as soon as possible to oppose this. Wavell took the 6th Australian Division, along with part of 7th Armoured Division and most of the supplies and air support for this ultimately doomed operation. XIII Corps HQ was wound down and in February 1941 O'Connor was appointed general officer commanding-in-chief the British Troops in Egypt.

Matters were soon to become much worse for the British. By March 1941, Hitler had dispatched General Erwin Rommel along with the Afrika Korps to bolster the Italians in Libya. Wavell and O'Connor now faced a formidable foe under a commander whose cunning, resourcefulness, and daring would earn him the nickname "the Desert Fox". Rommel wasted little time in launching his own offensive on 31 March. The inexperienced 2nd Armoured Division was soundly defeated and on 2 April Wavell came forward to review matters with Lieutenant-general Sir Philip Neame, by now the commander of British and Commonwealth troops in Cyrenaica (Wilson having left to command the Allied expeditionary force in Greece). O'Connor was called forward and arrived from Cairo the next day, but declined to assume Neame's command because of his lack of familiarity with the prevailing conditions. However, he agreed to stay to advise.

On 6 April O'Connor and Neame, while travelling to their headquarters which had been withdrawn from Maraua to Timimi, were captured by a German patrol near Martuba.

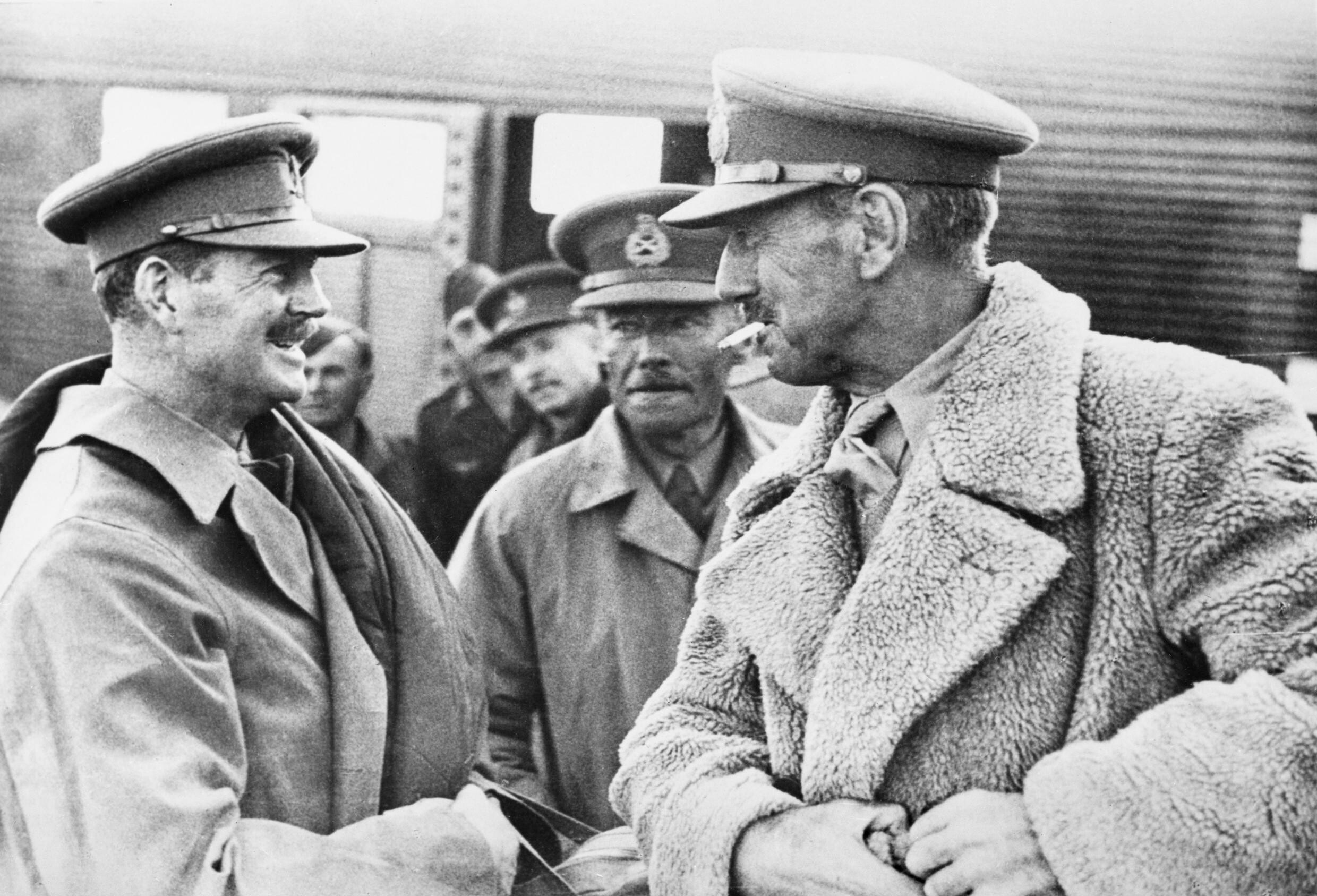
O'Connor (centre, middle distance) along with Brigadier John Combe (left), Lieutenant-general Philip Neame (centre) and Major-general Michael Gambier-Parry (right), after their capture in North Africa pictured in front of a Luftwaffe Junkers Ju 52.

=== Captivity and escape ===
O'Connor spent the next two and a half years as a prisoner of war, mainly at the Castello di Vincigliata near Florence, Italy. Here he and Neame were in the company of such figures as Major-general Sir Adrian Carton de Wiart and Air Vice Marshal Owen Tudor Boyd. Although the conditions of their imprisonment were not unpleasant, the officers soon formed an escape club and began planning a break-out. Their first attempt, a simple attempt to climb over the castle walls, resulted in a month's solitary confinement. The second attempt, by an escape tunnel built between October 1942 and March 1943, had some success, with two New Zealander brigadiers, James Hargest and Reginald Miles, reaching Switzerland. O'Connor and Carton de Wiart, travelling on foot, were at large for a week but were captured near Bologna in the Po Valley. Once again, a month's solitary confinement was the result.

It was only after the Italian surrender in September 1943 that the final, successful, attempt was made. With help from the Italian resistance movement, Boyd, O'Connor and Neame escaped while being transferred from Vincigliati. After a failed rendezvous with a submarine, they arrived by boat at Termoli, then went on to Bari where they were welcomed as guests by General Sir Harold Alexander, commanding the Allied Armies in Italy (AAI), then fighting on the Italian Front, along with the American General Dwight D. Eisenhower, on 21 December 1943. Upon his return to Britain, O'Connor was presented with the knighthood he had been awarded in 1941 and promoted to lieutenant-general. Montgomery suggested that O'Connor be his successor as British Eighth Army commander, but that post was instead given to Oliver Leese and O'Connor was given a corps to command.

=== VIII Corps and Normandy ===
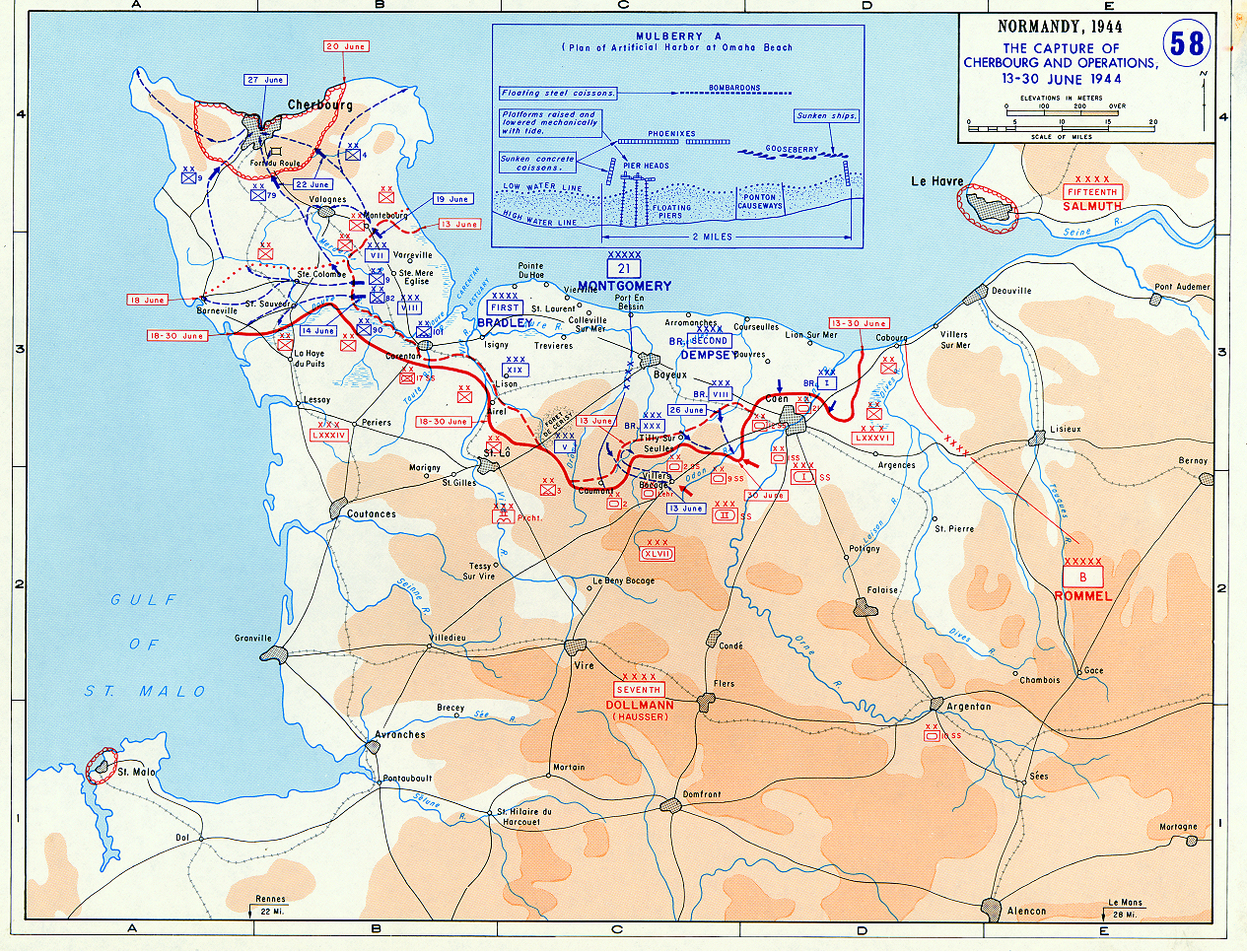
The Normandy Campaign, 13 to 30 June 1944.

On 21 January 1944 O'Connor became commander of VIII Corps, which consisted of the Guards Armoured Division, 11th Armoured Division, 15th (Scottish) Infantry Division, along with 6th Guards Tank Brigade, 8th Army Group Royal Artillery and 2nd Household Cavalry Regiment. The corps formed part of the British Second Army, commanded by Lieutenant-general Miles Dempsey, which itself was part of the Anglo-Canadian 21st Army Group, commanded by General Sir Bernard Montgomery, a friend who had also been a fellow instructor at the Staff College, Camberley in the 1920s, in addition to having served together in Palestine some years before. O'Connor's new command was to take part in Operation Overlord, the Allied invasion of German-occupied France, although it was not scheduled for the initial landings as it was to form part of the second wave to go ashore.

On 11 June 1944, five days after the initial landings in Normandy, O'Connor and the leading elements of VIII Corps arrived in Normandy in the sector around Caen, which would be the scene of much hard fighting during the next few weeks. O'Connor's first mission (with the 43rd (Wessex) Infantry Division under command, replacing the Guards Armoured Division) was to mount Operation Epsom, a break out from the bridgehead established by the 3rd Canadian Infantry Division, cross the Odon and Orne rivers, then secure the high-ground positions northeast of Bretteville-sur-Laize and cut Caen off from the south. The break-out and river crossings were accomplished promptly. The army group commander, Montgomery, congratulated O'Connor and his VIII Corps on their success. But cutting off Caen would prove much harder. VIII Corps was pushed back over the Orne. O'Connor tried to re-establish a bridgehead during Operation Jupiter with the 43rd (Wessex) Division, but met with little success. Although the operation had failed to achieve its tactical objectives, Montgomery was pleased with the strategic benefits in the commitment and fixing of the German armoured reserves to the Caen sector.

After being withdrawn into reserve on 12 July, the next major action for VIII Corps would be Operation Goodwood, for which the corps was stripped of its infantry divisions but had a third armoured division (7th Armoured Division) attached. The attack began on 18 July with a massive aerial bombardment by the 9th USAAF, and ended on 20 July with a three-pronged drive to capture Bras and Hubert-Folie on the right, Fontenay on the left, and Bourguébus Ridge in the centre. However, the attack ground to a halt in pouring rain, turning the battlefield into a quagmire, with the major objectives still not taken, notably the Bourguebus Ridge which was the key to any break-out.

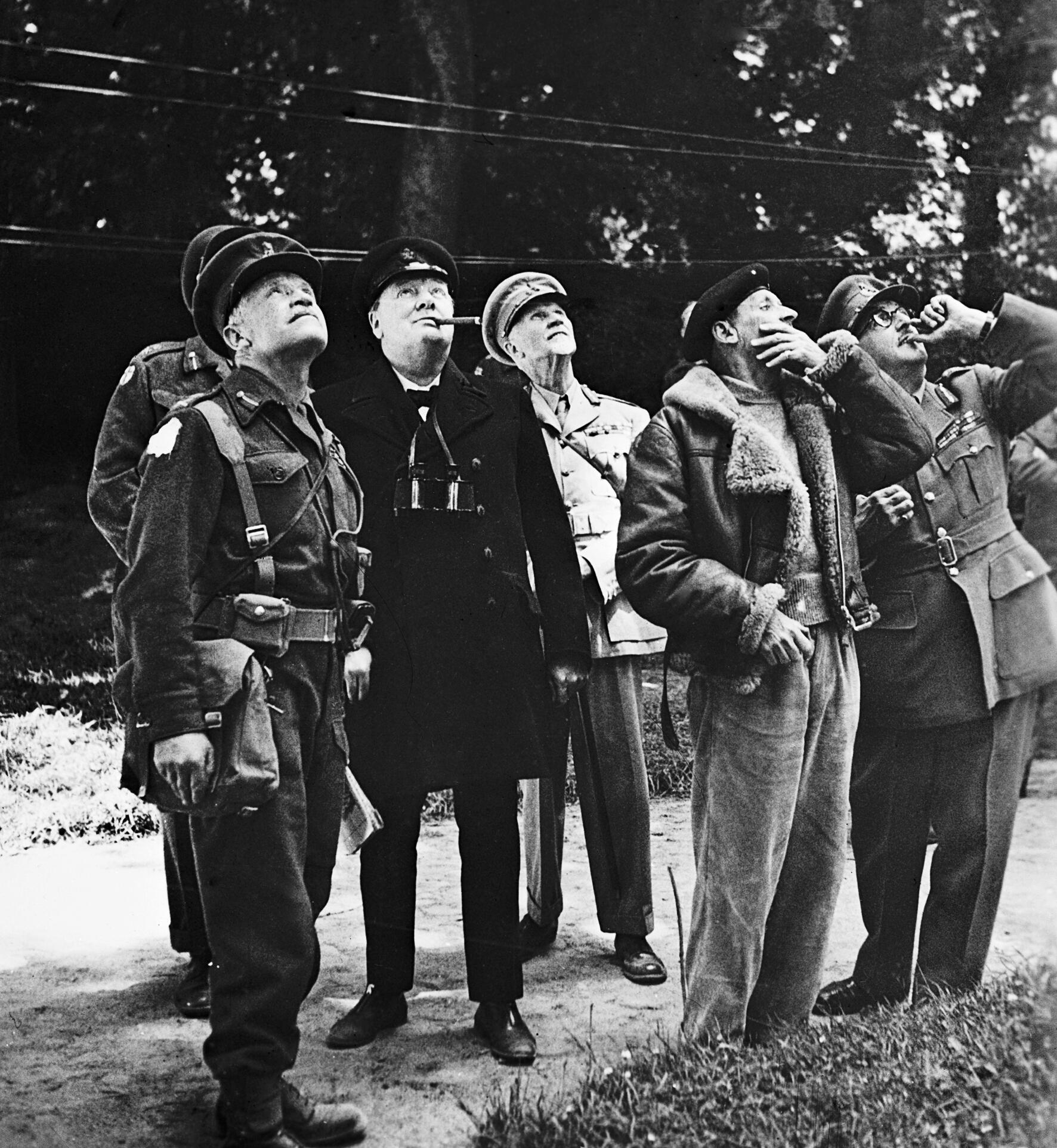
O'Connor looking at enemy and British aircraft engaged overhead with Prime Minister Winston Churchill, Field Marshal Jan Smuts, General Sir Bernard Montgomery and Field Marshal Sir Alan Brooke in Normandy, 12 June 1944.

Restored to its pre-invasion formation but with British 3rd Infantry Division attached, the corps was switched to the southwest of Caen to take part in Operation Bluecoat. 15th (Scottish) Division attacked towards Vire to the east and west of Bois du Homme in order to facilitate the American advance in Operation Cobra (O'Connor, 5/3/25 July 29 1944). A swift drive was followed by fierce fighting to the south during the first two days of the advance, with both sides taking heavy losses.

As the allies prepared to pursue the Germans from France, O'Connor learned that VIII Corps would not take part in this phase of the campaign. VIII Corps was placed in reserve, and its transport used to supply XXX Corps and XII Corps. His command was reduced in mid-August, with the transfer of the Guards Armoured Divisions and 11th Armoured Division to XXX Corps and 15th (Scottish) Division to XII Corps. While in reserve, O'Connor maintained an active correspondence with Montgomery, Hobart and others, making suggestions for improvements of armoured vehicles and addressing various other problems such as combat fatigue. Some of his recommendations were followed up; such as for mounting "rams" on armoured vehicles in order to cope with the difficult hedgerow country (O'Connor, 5/3/41- 5/3/44 Aug 24, 26 1944).

=== Operation Market Garden and India ===
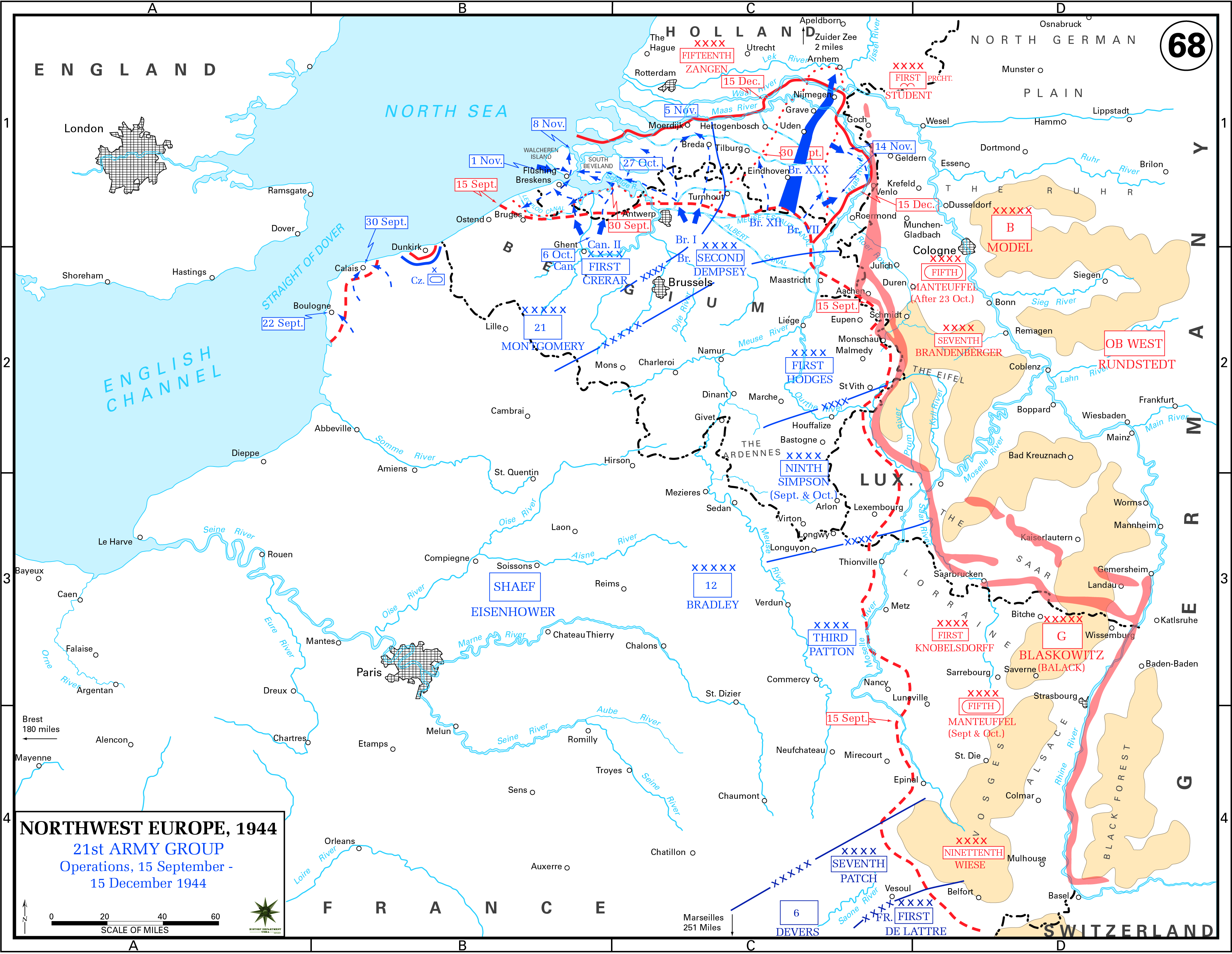
Operation Market Garden

O'Connor remained in command of VIII Corps, for the time being, and was given the task of supporting Lieutenant-general Brian Horrocks' XXX Corps in Operation Market Garden, the plan by Montgomery to establish a bridgehead across the Rhine in the Netherlands. Following their entry into Weert at the end of September, VIII Corps prepared for and took part in Operation Aintree, the advance towards Venray and Venlo beginning on 12 October.

However, on 27 November O'Connor was removed from his post and was ordered to take over from Lieutenant-general Sir Mosley Mayne as GOC-in-C, Eastern Command, India. Smart's account says that Montgomery prompted the move for, "not being ruthless enough with his American subordinates", although Mead states that the initiative was taken by Field Marshal Sir Alan Brooke, the Chief of the Imperial General Staff (CIGS), but Montgomery made no attempt to retain O'Connor. He was succeeded as GOC VIII Corps by Major-general Evelyn Barker, a much younger man and formerly the GOC of the 49th (West Riding) Infantry Division who had been one of O'Connor's students at the Staff College at Camberley in the late 1920s. This marked the end of a long and distinguished combat career, although the new job was an important one, controlling the lines of communication of the Fourteenth Army. O'Connor was mentioned in despatches for the thirteenth and final time of his career on 22 March 1945.

Having been promoted to full general in April 1945, O'Connor was appointed GOC-in-C North Western Army in India in October that year (the formation was renamed Northern Command in November of that year). By now the war was over.

== Post-war career ==
From 1946 to 1947 he was Adjutant-General to the Forces and aide-de-camp general to the King. His career as adjutant general was to be short-lived, however. After a disagreement over a cancelled demobilisation for troops stationed in the Far East, O'Connor offered his resignation in September 1947, which was accepted. Montgomery, by then the CIGS in succession to Brooke, maintained that he had been sacked, rather than resigned, for being, "not up to the job." Not long after this he was installed as a Knight Grand Cross of the Order of the Bath.

== Retirement and final years ==
O'Connor retired in 1948 at the age of fifty-eight. However, he maintained his links with the army and took on other responsibilities. He was commandant of the Army Cadet Force in Scotland from 1948 to 1959; colonel of the Cameronians, 1951 to 1954; Lord lieutenant of Ross and Cromarty from 1955 to 1964 and served as Lord High Commissioner to the General Assembly of the Church of Scotland in 1964. His first wife, Jean, died in 1959, and in 1963 he married Dorothy Russell.

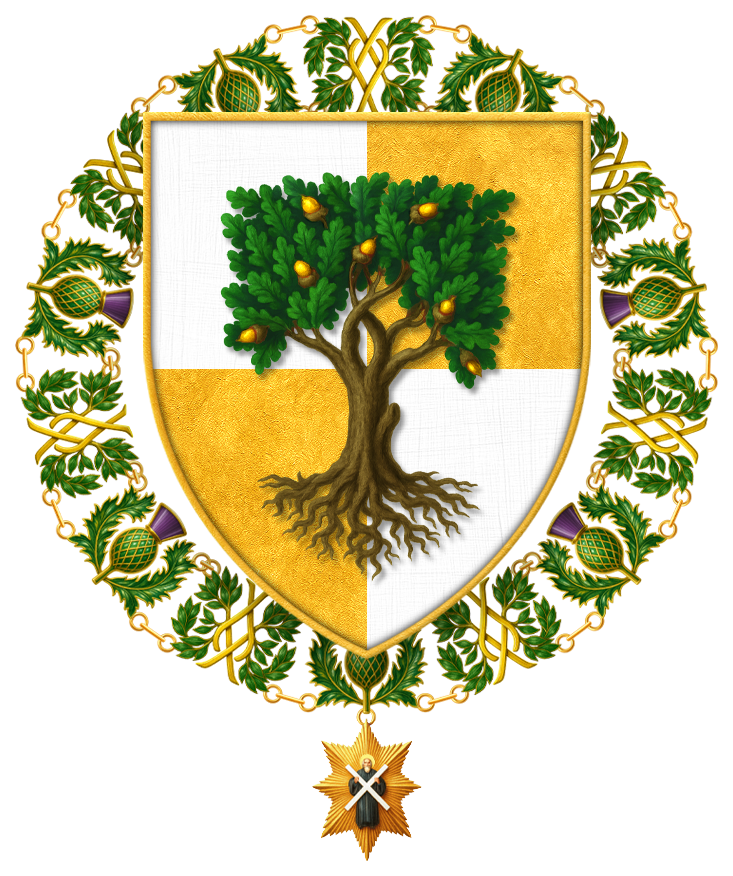
Shield of Arms of Gen. Sir Richard Nugent O'Connor, KT, encircled with the collar of the Order of the Thistle – Quarterly argent and or, an oak tree eradicated proper.

In July 1971, he was created Knight of the Order of the Thistle. O’Connor was interviewed concerning North African operations in episode 8, "The Desert: North Africa (1940–1943)”, of the acclaimed British documentary television series The World at War. O'Connor died in London on 17 June 1981, just two months shy of his 92nd birthday. There was a small funeral, attended by his family only. There were also two memorial services, one held in London on 15 July, with O'Connor's great friend and admirer Field Marshal Lord Harding, as he was now known, giving the address, where he stated the following:

Dick O'Connor was my ideal of a commander in battle; always approachable and ready to listen, yet firm and decisive and always fair in his judgement of people and events; modest to a degree, shunning the limelight and embarrassed by praise; calmly resolute and courageously determined.

The second memorial service was held in Edinburgh on 11 August, at which Lieutenant General Sir George Collingwood, who had been O'Connor's aide-de-camp in the late 1930s, made the address. Making references to O'Connor's campaign in the desert some forty years earlier, he then mentioned his numerous attempts to escape from captivity, alongside his happy private life and his two "wonderful partners in the home", before ending his address with:

So there is in a sense a picture of three different people. The dedicated soldier and brilliant fighting Commander, a prisoner of war exerting all his energies and taking great risks to escape and return to serve his Country, and the quiet, unassuming little country gentleman with the kindly smile and charming manners, who was a wonderful host and a wonderful guest, but of course it was one and the same person and the chief facets of his character were, I think, great courage and determination, an impelling sense of duty, loyalty, extreme personal modesty, kindness and generosity and a delightful sense of humour. I think the jokes he liked best were those against himself.

== Notes ==
Military offices
Preceded by Claude Auchinleck	Commander, Peshawar Brigade; 1936–1938	Succeeded by George Channer
New post	GOC 7th Infantry Division; 1938–1939	Post redesignated 6th Infantry Division
New post	GOC 6th Infantry Division; 1939–1940	Succeeded by John Evetts
New post	GOC Western Desert Force; 1940–1941	Post redesignated XIII Corps
New post	GOC XIII Corps; 1941	Succeeded by Noel Beresford-Peirse
Preceded by Sir Henry Wilson	GOC British Troops in Egypt; February–April 1941	Succeeded by James Marshall-Cornwall
Preceded by John Harding	GOC VIII Corps; January–November 1944	Succeeded by Evelyn Barker
Preceded by Sir Mosley Mayne	GOC-in-C Eastern Command, India; January–October 1945	Succeeded by Sir Arthur Smith
Preceded by Cecil Toovey	GOC-in-C Northern Command, India; 1945–1946	Succeeded by Sir Frank Messervy
Preceded by Sir Ronald Adam	Adjutant-General to the Forces; 1946–1947	Succeeded by Sir James Steele
Honorary titles
Preceded by Sir Thomas Riddell-Webster	Colonel of the Cameronians (Scottish Rifles); 1951–1954	Succeeded by Douglas Graham
Preceded by Sir Hector Mackenzie	Lord Lieutenant of Ross and Cromarty; 1955–1964	Succeeded by Sir John Stirling
