= 53rd Battalion =

53rd Battalion may refer to:

- 53rd Battalion (Australia)
- 53rd Battalion (Northern Saskatchewan), CEF
- 53rd Transportation Battalion, a transportation battalion of the United States Army
