= Kuvva =

Kuvva is an app for the iPhone or Mac desktop that streams wallpapers from different artists. Kuvva was co-founded by Damian Bradfield and Nalden in Amsterdam and developed by Present Plus. Kuvva launched in 2011 during The Next Web conference. Kuvva wallpapers are available for use in the smartphone application Strava.

== See also ==
- iOS
- Mobile app
- Computer wallpaper
