= Damian Bradfield =

British businessman

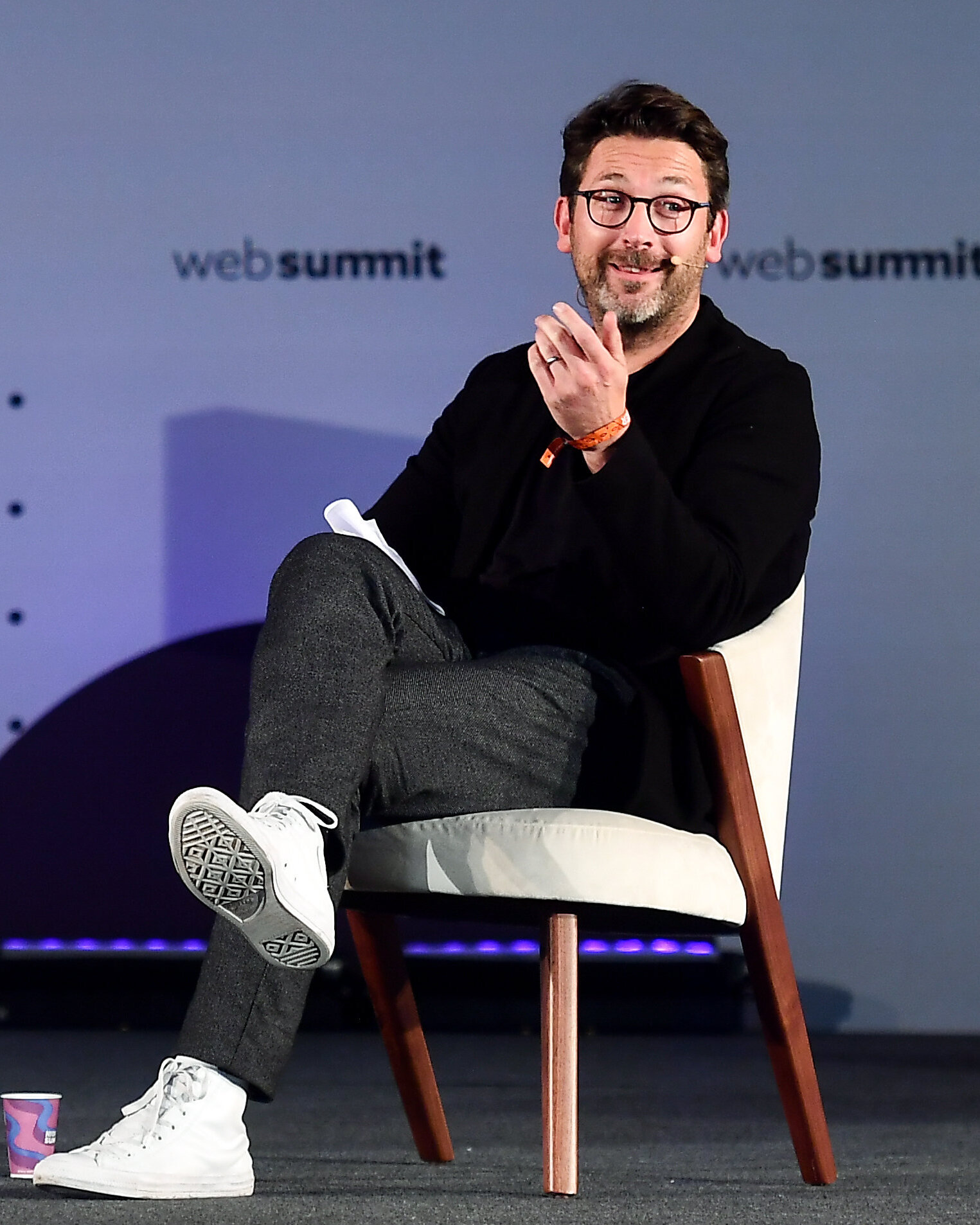
- Born: 29 March 1977 (age 49); Canterbury, England
- Education: London School of Economics
- Employer: WeTransfer
- Website: damianbradfield.com

Damian Bradfield (born 29 March 1977) is an entrepreneur, writer, publisher, podcaster, and cultural curator. He is best known as the co-founder of WeTransfer, the digital file-sharing and media platform founded in Amsterdam in 2009, where he served as Chief Creative Officer until the company's sale in 2024. Bradfield is known for his work at the intersection of technology, creativity, publishing, and cultural production, and has become known for advocating trust, ethical technology, and artist-led innovation.

Based in Amsterdam, Netherlands, Bradfield is the founder of FUPE, an independent publishing and entertainment company, and serves as chairman of the Supporting Act Foundation and trustee of the Sarabande Foundation. In addition to his entrepreneurial work, he is the author of several books including The Trust Manifesto, Algorithmic Reality, Not A Playbook, and Caro Carrowack.

== Biography ==
Bradfield was born in Canterbury, Kent, England. He attended Kent College before enrolling at Oxford Brookes University. He subsequently left university and spent time in South Africa before later applying to and attending the London School of Economics, where he studied Geography.

After graduating from LSE, Bradfield worked for Gucci Group and Stella McCartney before pursuing a career in advertising in London.

== Career ==
=== Early Ventures ===
Bradfield worked at DLKW and AMVBBDO in London before moving to Amsterdam in 2005, Bradfield began working for the advertising agency J. Walter Thompson (JWT) while spending significant time in Moscow working with one of the agency's largest clients.

In 2010, Bradfield left JWT and established the design studio Present Plus with Dutch entrepreneur Nalden. Through the studio they developed Kuvva, a digital wallpaper platform that featured artwork from leading photographers, designers, and illustrators.

=== WeTransfer ===
In 2010, Bradfield joined WeTransfer in Amsterdam alongside Nalden, Bas Beerens, and Rinke Visser. The company launched as a simplified file-sharing service designed for creatives frustrated by cumbersome enterprise software.

Under Bradfield's creative leadership, WeTransfer evolved from a practical utility into one of Europe's culturally distinctive technology brands. The company became known for combining design, editorial storytelling, and support for artists through initiatives such as WePresent, the company's arts and culture platform.

Bradfield played a significant role in shaping WeTransfer's public identity, emphasizing trust, privacy, transparency, and user respect as key differentiators within the technology sector. He frequently argued that trust should function as a strategic business advantage rather than simply a compliance requirement.

In July 2017, acting in his capacity as WeTransfer president, Bradfield offered a $10,000 grant to each of the 173 employees laid off by SoundCloud to help them pursue new ventures and creative projects.

During his tenure, WeTransfer grew to 90 million monthly users worldwide and attracted major investment rounds.

Bradfield created the platform WePresent. The cultural arts platform of WeTransfer. That went on to win numerous awards alongside artists such as FKA Twigs, established radio station WWFM alongside Gilles Peterson and won an Oscar for the film The Long Goodbye with actor Riz Ahmed and director The company was sold in 2024, concluding Bradfield's formal leadership role. He is no longer affiliated with the company.

=== Publishing and FUPE ===
Following his departure from WeTransfer, Bradfield founded FUPE, an independent publishing and entertainment company focused on experimental storytelling, visual culture, and literary innovation.

Through FUPE, Bradfield has worked across fiction, illustrated narrative publishing, audio projects, cultural programming, and collaborative art-led initiatives. The company has developed projects that intentionally blur the boundaries between literature, design, technology, and performance.

Under the FUPE umbrella, Bradfield has also launched Megalomaniacs, an arts-focused platform exploring contemporary creative culture and alternative forms of storytelling.

=== Cultural curation and public arts ===
Bradfield has expanded his practice into cultural curation and public art programming. His work frequently explores relationships between public participation, technology, performance, and visual storytelling.

In 2026, he curated artist Daisy Collingridge's Bod installation for the Times Square Arts Midnight Moment programme in New York City. The project featured large-scale wearable sculptures that combined fashion, costume design, performance, and fine art, forming part of Times Square's public arts programming.

=== Podcasting ===
==== The Influence Podcast ====
Bradfield is the host of Influence, a long-form interview podcast exploring creativity, leadership, entrepreneurship, technology, and cultural change.

The series returned for its fourth season in 2022 and has featured conversations with artists, entrepreneurs, filmmakers, designers, and cultural leaders including Riz Ahmed, Harris Reed, Russell Tovey, Dame Stephanie Shirley, Davis Guggenheim, and Cyrill Gutsch.

=== Newsletter ===
Bradfield writes Any Given Sunday, a monthly newsletter covering technology, creativity, culture, media, and contemporary ideas.

== Media ==
Bradfield has appeared extensively in international media discussing technology, trust, creativity, entrepreneurship, branding, and digital culture.

His work and interviews have been featured in publications including the Financial Times, The Times, The Sunday Times, Fast Company, Creative Review, The Drum, Design Week, Literary Hub, Mr Porter, Fortune, TechCrunch and The Genius List

He has also appeared on numerous podcasts and broadcast programmes, including Russell Brand's Under The Skin podcast, where he discussed themes from The Trust Manifesto and the influence of major technology platforms.

== Other Works ==
Bradfield serves as chairman of the Supporting Act Foundation, a philanthropic organization supporting cultural and social impact initiatives.

He is also a trustee of the Sarabande Foundation, the charitable institution established by fashion designer Alexander McQueen to support emerging creative talent.

Bradfield has served as chairman of the University of the Underground and has participated in the Champions of Change Global Tech initiative. He has also served as a director of Tour De Moon Ltd., a public arts festival touring the United Kingdom.

== Writing ==
Bradfield is the author of multiple books exploring trust, business culture, creativity, technology, and cultural systems.

=== The Trust Manifesto ===
Published by Penguin Books in 2019, The Trust Manifesto: What You Need to Do to Create a Better Internet examines how trust has become one of the defining social and commercial challenges of the digital age. The book argues for rebuilding digital systems around transparency, responsibility, and meaningful human relationships.

The work was widely discussed across publishing and technology circles and positioned Bradfield as an advocate for trust-based digital design.

=== Los años de internet ===
Published in 2021 and co-authored with Spanish comic artist David Sánchez, Los años de internet (The Internet Years) explored the social and cultural consequences of digital life through a graphic narrative format. The english version was Published in 2022 under the title of Algorithmic Reality.

=== Not A Playbook ===
Published by FUPE in March 2025 and co-authored with Andreas Tzortzis, Not A Playbook: The Art of Building a Brand reflects on entrepreneurship, creativity, leadership, and brand-building while challenging formulaic approaches to business growth.

The book advocates adaptive experimentation over rigid startup orthodoxy and features contributions from a range of artists and cultural figures including FKA Twigs, Russell Tovey, Moses Sumney, and Tim Walker.

=== Caro Carrowack ===
Created in collaboration with illustrator Luis Mendo, Caro Carrowack is an experimental narrative project combining fiction, illustration, and immersive world-building.

== Philanthropy ==
Bradfield's philanthropic and governance work focuses primarily on supporting creative talent, cultural institutions, and socially driven initiatives. Through his roles with the Supporting Act Foundation and the Sarabande Foundation, he has contributed to programmes designed to support emerging artists, designers, and cultural entrepreneurs.

== Views and opinions ==
Bradfield's public work frequently focuses on the relationship between trust, creativity, technology, and institutional power.

He has argued that technology companies should move beyond extractive business models toward systems rooted in ethical stewardship, cultural responsibility, and long-term trust. His writing and public speaking often explore how creative thinking can help shape more humane digital systems and institutions.

== Personal life ==
Bradfield is married with two children and is based in Amsterdam, Netherlands.
