= George Wood (British Army officer) =

British general

Major-General George Wood CB CBE DSO MC
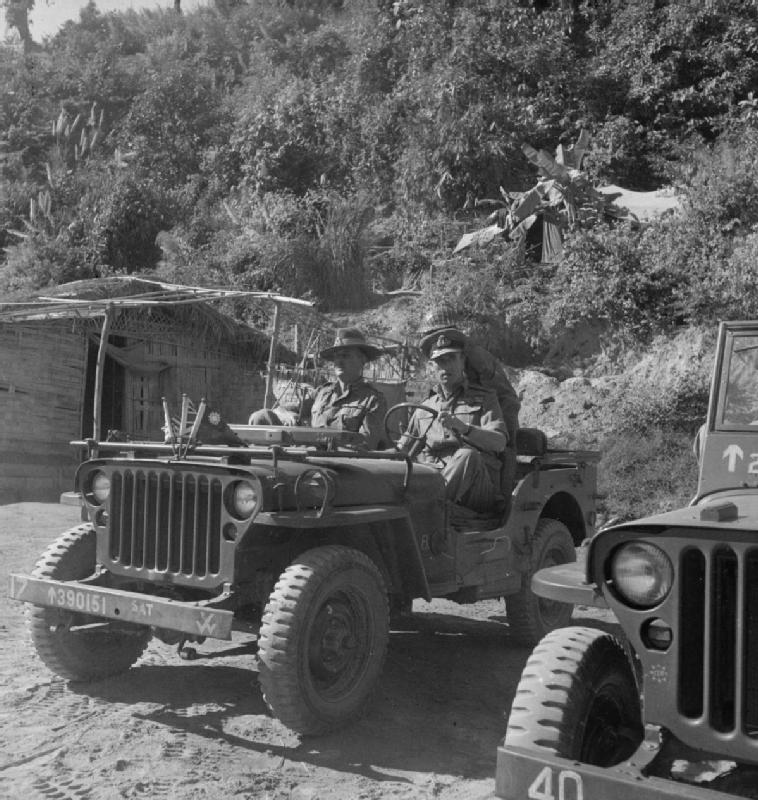
- Lord Louis Mountbatten, Supreme Allied Commander South East Asia, with Wood (left) in a jeep during a visit to the 25th Indian Division, January 1945
- Born: May 4, 1898; Bristol, England
- Died: January 14, 1982 (aged 83); Camden, England
- Military career
- Allegiance: United Kingdom
- Branch: British Army
- Service years: 1916–1952
- Rank: Major-General
- Service number: 13820
- Unit: Dorsetshire Regiment
- Commands: 53rd (Welsh) Infantry Division; 25th Indian Infantry Division; 4th Indian Infantry Brigade; 2nd Battalion, Dorsetshire Regiment; 12th Battalion, West Yorkshire Regiment
- Conflicts: First World War; Russian Civil War; Second World War
- Awards: Companion of the Order of the Bath; Commander of the Order of the British Empire; Distinguished Service Order; Military Cross; Mentioned in despatches (2)

Major-General George Neville Wood, CB, CBE, DSO, MC (4 May 1898 – 14 January 1982) was a senior British Army officer who fought during the First and Second World War, commanding the 25th Indian Infantry Division during the Burma campaign.

== Early life ==
Wood was born on 4 May 1898 in Bristol, England the son of Frederick and Hannah Wood, his father was a commercial traveller.

== Military career ==
After being educated at Colston's School, Wood entered the Royal Military College, Sandhurst and was commissioned as a second lieutenant into the Dorsetshire Regiment in January 1916. He fought in the First World War, serving the last year of the war in the Royal Air Force and was awarded the Military Cross, mentioned in despatches and made an Officer of the Order of the British Empire. He went on to serve in the Russian Civil War.

He was promoted to temporary major in 1920.

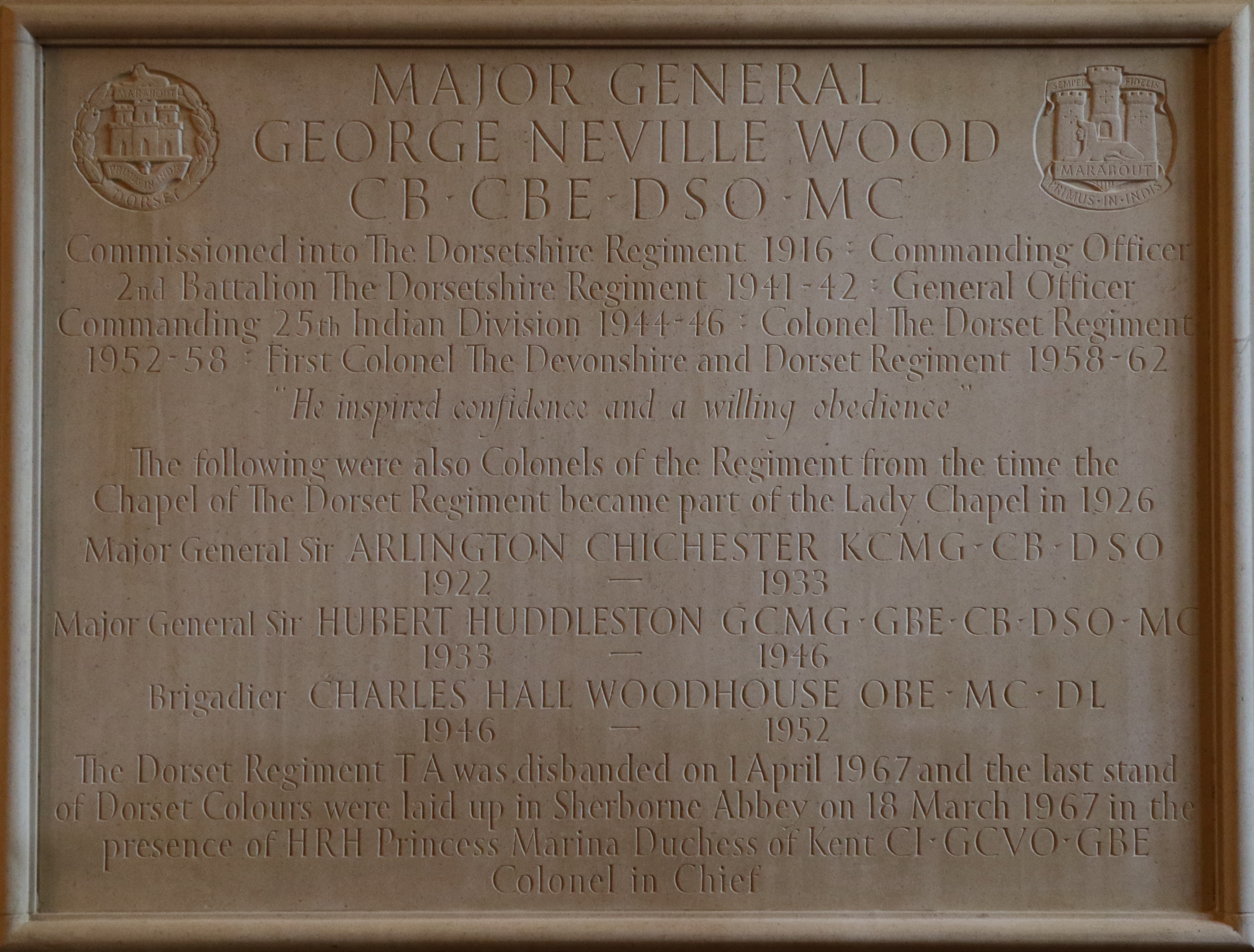
Memorial plaque to Wood in Sherborne Abbey

Attending the Staff College, Camberley from 1926 to 1927, he was made a GSO2 at the War Office in London on 12 May 1938.

During the Second World War Wood was the commanding officer (CO) of the 12th Battalion, West Yorkshire Regiment in 1941 and CO of the 2nd Battalion, Dorset Regiment between late 1941 and mid-1942. In July 1942 he was the acting commander of the 5th Indian Infantry Brigade before becoming commander of the 4th Indian Infantry Brigade until January 1943. In October 1944, Wood was made acting major-general and took the command of the 25th Indian Infantry Division, overseeing victory at the decisive Battle of Kangaw and Operation Zipper during the Burma campaign.

Promoted to full major-general in February 1947, Wood became General Officer Commanding (GOC) 3rd (United Kingdom) Division in April 1947; between August 1947 and March 1950, he was GOC 53rd (Welsh) Infantry Division, before serving as Director of Quartering at the War Office until his retirement in 1952. He was subsequently honorary colonel of the Dorset Regiment from 1952 to 1958 and the first honorary colonel of the Devonshire and Dorset Regiment.

== Bibliography ==
- Smart, Nick (2005). Biographical Dictionary of British Generals of the Second World War. Barnesley: Pen & Sword. ISBN 1844150496.

Military offices
Preceded by Henry Davies	GOC 25th Indian Infantry Division; 1944–1946	Succeeded by Post disbanded
Preceded by John Churcher	GOC 3rd Infantry Division; April–June 1947	Succeeded by Sir Hugh Stockwell
Preceded by Christopher Woolner	GOC 53rd (Welsh) Infantry Division; 1947–1950	Succeeded by Ernest Down
Honorary titles
Preceded by Charles Hall Woodhouse	Colonel of the Dorsetshire Regiment; 1952–1958	Succeeded by Regiment amalgamated with the Devonshire Regiment to form the Devonshire and Dorset Regiment
Preceded by New post	Colonel of the Devonshire and Dorset Regiment; 1958–1962	Succeeded by Hugh Borradaile
