= 74th Indian Infantry Brigade =

- Active: 1942–1945
- Country: (British Raj) British India
- Allegiance: British Empire
- Branch: British Indian Army
- Type: Infantry
- Size: Brigade
- Part of: 25th Indian Infantry Division
- Engagements: Burma Campaign

Commanders
- Notable commanders: J.E. Hirst; J.C.W. Cargill

The 74th Indian Infantry Brigade was an infantry brigade formation of the Indian Army during World War II. It was formed in July 1942, in India. The brigade was assigned to the 25th Indian Infantry Division and fought in the Burma Campaign.

== Formation ==
- 8th Battalion, 19th Hyderabad Regiment August 1942 to September 1943
- 14th Battalion, 10th Baluch Regiment August 1942 to August 1945
- 6th Battalion, Oxfordshire and Buckinghamshire Light Infantry August 1942 to June 1945
- 3rd Battalion, 2nd Gurkha Rifles October 1943 to August 1945
- 9th Battalion, Royal Sussex Regiment July to August 1945

== See also ==
- List of Indian Army Brigades in World War II
