= Peshawar Brigade =

- Active: 1907–1945
- Country: (British Raj) British India
- Allegiance: British Empire
- Branch: British Indian Army
- Type: Infantry
- Size: Brigade

Commanders
- Notable commanders: Claude Auchinleck; Richard O'Connor; GO der Channer; EVR Bellers

The Peshawar Brigade was an infantry brigade formation of the Indian Army during World War II. It was formed in December 1907, for service on the North West Frontier. During World War II it was normal practice for newly formed battalions to be posted to the North West Frontier for service before being sent to Africa, Burma or Italy.

== Formation ==
These units served in the brigade during World War II

- 1st King's Regiment
- 16th Light Cavalry
- 2/19th Hyderabad Regiment
- 24th Mountain Regiment, Indian Artillery
- 3/6th Rajputana Rifles
- 4/8th Punjab Regiment
- 4/14th Punjab Regiment
- 5/10th Baluch Regiment
- 5/12th Frontier Force Regiment
- 2/11th Sikh Regiment
- 4/17th Dogra Regiment
- Kalibahadur Regiment, Nepal
- 5/5th Mahratta Light Infantry
- 2/2nd Punjab Regiment
- 11/18th Royal Garhwal Rifles
- 4/18th Royal Garhwal Rifles
- 4/15th Punjab Regiment
- 7/12th Frontier Force Regiment
- 6/18th Royal Garhwal Rifles
- 2nd Duke of Wellington's Regiment
- 26th Mountain Regiment IA
- 9/1st Punjab Regiment
- 8/11th Sikh Regiment
- 7/17th Dogra Regiment
- 1st Queen's Royal Regiment
- 4th Jammu and Kashmir Infantry
- 16/5th Mahratta Light Infantry
- 6/19th Hyderabad Regiment
- 6/18th Royal Garhwal Rifles
- 6/7th Rajput Regiment
- 14/9th Jat Regiment
- 7th York and Lancaster Regiment
- 20 Mountain Regiment IA
- 5/8th Punjab Regiment
- 5/15th Punjab Regiment
- 6/6th Rajputana Rifles
- 2nd Green Howards
- 2nd Patiala Infantry
- 1st Somerset Light Infantry
- 6/8th Punjab Regiment
- 8/2nd Punjab Regiment
- 29th Mountain Regiment IA
- 5/4th Bombay Grenadiers
- 5/16th Punjab Regiment
- 18/5th Mahratta Light Infantry
- 9/19th Hyderabad Regiment
- 1st Field Company Indian Engineers
- 8th Anti-Aircraft Battery Royal Artillery
- 18th Mountain Battery IA
- 19th Medium Battery RA
- 62nd Field Company IE

== See also ==
- List of Indian Army Brigades in World War II
