= 53rd Indian Infantry Brigade =

- Active: 1942–1945
- Country: British India
- Allegiance: British Crown
- Branch: British Indian Army
- Size: Brigade
- Engagements: Burma Campaign

Commanders
- Notable commanders: Brigadier G A P Coldstream; Brigadier A G O'C Scott; Brigadier R A Hutton; Brigadier B C H Gerty

The 53rd Indian Infantry Brigade was an infantry formation of the Indian Army during the Second World War. It was formed in March 1942, in India. In April 1942, it was assigned to the 20th Indian Infantry Division but was soon after in August 1942 transferred to the 25th Indian Infantry Division, staying with the 25th until the end of the war.

== Formation ==
- 14th Battalion, 10th Baluch Regiment March to August 1942
- 9th Battalion, 9th Jat Regiment April to July 1942 – 1942
- 2nd Battalion, 2nd Punjab Regiment April 1942 to August 1943
- 9th Battalion, York and Lancaster Regiment June 1942 to June 1944
- MG Battalion, 13th Frontier Force Rifles September 1942 to September 1944
- 4th Battalion, 18th Royal Garhwal Rifles August 1943 to August 1945
- 17th Battalion, 5th Mahratta Light Infantry September 1944 to August 1945
- 7th Battalion, 16th Punjab Regiment January 1945
- Kumaon Rifles April to August 1945

== See also ==
- List of Indian Army Brigades in World War II
