= 53rd Infantry Division (Russian Empire) =

- 53-я пехотная дивизия
- Active: 1914–1918
- Country: Russian Empire
- Branch: Russian Imperial Army
- Role: Infantry

The 53rd Infantry Division (Russian: 53-я пехотная дивизия, 53-ya Pekhotnaya Diviziya) was an infantry formation of the Russian Imperial Army.

== Organization ==
- 1st Brigade
  - 209th Infantry Regiment
  - 210th Infantry Regiment
- 2nd Brigade
  - 211th Infantry Regiment
  - 212th Infantry Regiment
- 53rd Artillery Brigade

== Commanders ==
- 1915: S. P. Abakanovich
- 1915–1917: D. K. Guncadze

== Commanders of the 1st Brigade ==
- 1914–1915: I. A. Kholmsen
