= 53rd Street (disambiguation) =

53rd Street may refer to:

- 53rd Street (Manhattan), a midtown cross street in New York City

== New York City Subway ==
- 53rd Street (BMT Fourth Avenue Line), in Brooklyn; serving the N, R, and W trains
- Fifth Avenue / 53rd Street (IND Queens Boulevard Line), in Manhattan; serving the E, F, and <F> trains
- Lexington Avenue – 53rd Street (IND Queens Boulevard Line), also in Manhattan; serving the E, F, and <F> trains
- 53rd Street (IRT Third Avenue Line), a defunct aboveground station in Manhattan, closed 1955

== Elsewhere ==
- 51st/53rd Street/Hyde Park station, a commuter train station in Chicago
