= 53rd Brigade =

53rd Brigade or 53rd Infantry Brigade may refer to:

== China ==
- 53rd Mountain Motorized Infantry Brigade (People's Republic of China)

== Greece ==
- 53rd Brigade (Greece) of the Greek Army during the Greek Civil War

== India ==
- 53rd Indian Brigade of the British Indian Army in the First World War
- 53rd Indian Infantry Brigade of the British Indian Army in the Second World War

== Russia ==
- 53rd Anti-Aircraft Missile Brigade of the Russian Ground Forces

== Ukraine ==
- 53rd Mechanized Brigade (Ukraine)

== United Kingdom ==
- 53rd Brigade (United Kingdom) of the British Army during the First and Second World Wars

=== Artillery units ===
- 53rd (Howitzer) Brigade, Royal Field Artillery of the British Army in the First World War
- 53rd (Bolton) Brigade, Royal Field Artillery of the British Army after the First World War
- 53rd (City of London) Anti-Aircraft Brigade, Royal Garrison Artillery
- 53rd (London) Medium Brigade, Royal Garrison Artillery

== United States ==
- 53rd Infantry Brigade Combat Team

== See also ==
- 53rd Division (disambiguation)
- 53rd Regiment (disambiguation)
