= FiftyThree =

American privately held technology company

FiftyThree, Inc.
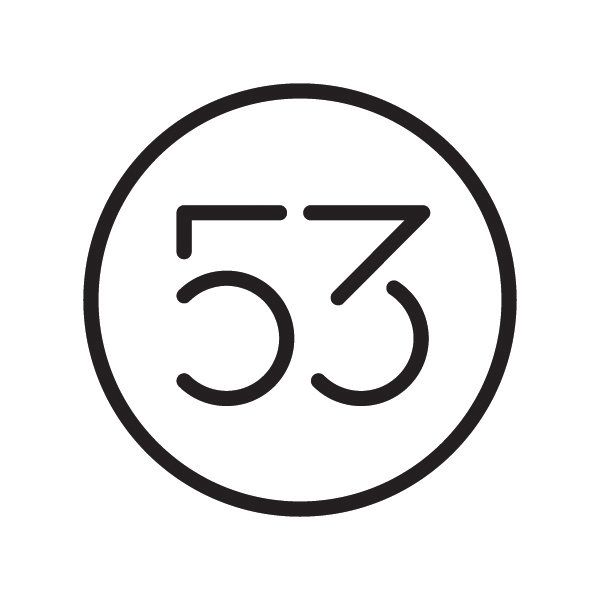
- Company type: Private
- Industry: Mobile tools for creation
- Founded: 2011; 15 years ago
- Founders: Georg Petschnigg, Jonathan Harris, Julian Walker, Andrew S. Allen
- Defunct: August 21, 2018; 7 years ago
- Headquarters: 60 Hudson, New York, United States
- Products: Paper and Paste
- Number of employees: 14 (2018)
- Website: fiftythree.com

FiftyThree, Inc. was an American privately held technology company that specialized in tools for mobile creation and creativity. They were the makers of Paper, Apple's 2012 iPad App of the Year, Pencil, a digital stylus, and Paste, a collaborative presentation tool. FiftyThree had offices in New York City and Seattle.

On August 21, 2018, WeTransfer acquired FiftyThree's assets and patents. As such, Paper and Paste apps are now products of WeTransfer. Of FiftyThree's 14 employees, 12 joined WeTransfer, including the company's entire executive team.

In 2024, We Transfer was acquired by Bending Spoons, which owns Evernote. As at January 2026, the Paper app is available from the App Store as an Evernote offering.

== History ==
FiftyThree was co-founded in 2011 by Georg Petschnigg, Jonathan Harris, Julian Walker, and Andrew S. Allen. Former colleagues at Microsoft, the company aimed to build creativity tools that were less encumbered by the dense UI common to software used by creative professionals. Initially operating out of Petschnigg's apartment, they began work on their first product, Paper, which launched in March 2012 and was chosen by Apple as the iPad App of the Year. Two additional products, Book by FiftyThree and Moleskine, and Pencil by FiftyThree, were released in 2013, followed by the 2014 releases of the FiftyThree SDK and Mix, and the release of Paper 3.0.

According to a 2013 article on Wired, the name FiftyThree references the physical space in which a person creates: "An average human's arm's reach is 53 centimeters ... a sort of invisible sphere encompassing head, heart, and blank canvas." Since its inception, the company has maintained a nearly 1:1 ratio of designers to engineers. The team is composed of employees who have previously worked at Microsoft, Sonos, Google, Adobe, Apple, and Nike, among other companies. As of December 2014, the company employs 51 people. In June 2013, FiftyThree announced raising a $15 million Series A round of funding, led by Chris Dixon at Andreessen Horowitz. Other investors included SV Angel's Ron Conway, Highline Ventures' Shana Fisher, Thrive Capital's Josh Kushner, and Twitter / Square founder Jack Dorsey. FiftyThree collaborated with Women's Wear Daily in February 2013 to live sketch Mercedes-Benz Fashion Week in New York City, and in July 2013 they partnered with Historic Royal Palaces in London to bring technology to the Fashion Rules exhibition at Kensington Palace. They have subsequently partnered with (RED) to raise awareness and funds for AIDS, GE to use art to visualize brain activity, and Skillshare to teach classes using Paper. Skillshare classes were taught by artist Shantell Martin and data visualization expert Catherine Madden.

In 2014, FiftyThree moved their NYC headquarters to 60 Hudson, the original home of the Western Union Company and moved their Seattle offices to the historic Pioneer Square.

In March 2015, FiftyThree announced raising a $30 million Series B round of funding, led by Dayna Grayson at New Enterprise Associates (NEA). With the support of NEA, FiftyThree will grow their product offerings in business and education.

== Products ==
=== Paper ===
Paper by FiftyThree is an iPad application that launched in March 2012. Two weeks after its release, it had amassed 1.5 million downloads and 7 million pages had been created in Paper. As at April 2014, Paper has been downloaded over 10 million times and over 100 million pages have been created. According to FiftyThree's blog, creators spent one millennium in the app combined.

Paper contains digital journals in which users can create sketches, diagrams, illustrations, notes, or drawings, and share them by email or across the web. Paper is available in ten different languages, is free to download, and comes with the draw tool. The additional tools Sketch, Outline, Write, Color, and Mixer can be added via in-app purchases. Paper was built using an OpenGL framework, making it the first productivity tool to match the world of digital gaming. Paper flows between tasks with real-time 3D and shadows, includes a touch-gesture rewind feature, and a touch-gesture zoom. Paper released a new tool in October 2012: Mixer, which allows users to create custom colors by "mixing" two colors together in the color well. As of April 2014, over 47 million colors have been created using Mixer. In May 2013, the Made With Paper Stream launched to showcase user creations. The addition of Presentation Mode followed shortly, which allows users to hide the tool tray and menus when Paper is connected to a second display or projector.

FiftyThree updated Paper for iOS 7 in March 2014 and the November 2014 Paper 2.1.0 update included Adobe Creative Cloud integration, which allows users to export Paper pages directly into Adobe Creative Cloud Storage, and the Adobe programs Photoshop and Illustrator. In December 2014, FiftyThree updated Paper to include the features Color Picker and Swap Background Colors, which respectively lets users to sample colors from the canvas and save them to the palette, and swap background colors without losing drawings.

In September 2014, FiftyThree launched Mix. Mix is a public part of Paper where users can share their work, or work on someone else's shared creation. Mix contains templates, outlines, tutorials, notes, and sketches, and all creations shared are committed to the Creative Commons Universal Public Domain. The December 2014 Paper 2.2 release updated Mix to allow users to add friends from Tumblr, Twitter, and Facebook to their Mix contact list. The feature Global Search was also added, which enables users to find and follow people on Mix by their names and emails. In March 2015, 157 days after launch, FiftyThree announced that Mix had surpassed 1 million accounts created.

In February 2015, FiftyThree announced the Draw, Sketch, Outline, Write, Color, and Mixer tools in Paper would be available for free in each download of the Paper app. The free version of the tools became available with the Paper 2.3.1 update.

In May 2015, FiftyThree announced Think Kit, three additional free tools in Paper geared toward creating charts and diagrams. The tools, called Diagram, Cut, and Fill, employ FiftyThree's trademark drawing recognition and rendering system called Intention Engine. It detects and corrects dozens of shapes sketched in real-time, enabling users to create presentation-ready charts, diagrams, graphs, flows, wireframes, and models.

Along with Think Kit, FiftyThree introduced a new sharing menu that allowed users to open work made in the Paper app in other productivity apps including Trello, Slack, Dropbox, Box, and more. Entire journals may also be exported to PDF and Powerpoint formats.

In September 2015, FiftyThree brought Paper to the iPhone with the release of Paper 3.0. They introduced two new features: the photo import tool and the text tool. With photo import, users can take, import, annotate, and spotlight photographs. The text tool's swipe-to-style feature allows the user to format text and create bullet points by swiping left or right on the screen. The classic notebook interface was replaced by "Spaces", where individual ideas are arranged in a grid view. FiftyThree modified the Mix service as well, including switching the name to "People You Follow".

In November 2017, the app added an optional monthly subscription and was redesigned for iOS 11.

=== Pencil and the FiftyThree SDK ===
Pencil by FiftyThree is a digital stylus modeled after the carpenter pencil. It launched in November 2013 in the U.S. and Canada, and came in two models: graphite, made from brushed aluminum, and walnut, made from sustainably-harvested walnut. In January 2015, FiftyThree announced the availability of a third model of Pencil: Pencil Gold, made from an anodized, brushed aluminum. Pencil is an active stylus whose main features include palm rejection erase, and blend. Inside the tip and eraser are 14k gold-plated switches, allowing Pencil to communicate with an iPad over Bluetooth LE. Pencil's Palm Rejection allows users to rest their hand on the iPad while drawing, Blend lets users smudge or blur with their fingertips, and the built-in eraser enables users to flip Pencil around to erase. Pencil is certified Bluetooth Smart and has a built-in battery that charges from a USB port.

In July 2014, FiftyThree announced the FiftyThree SDK, which allows software developers to fully integrate Pencil into third-party apps. FiftyThree launched the SDK in partnership with the apps Procreate, Noteshelf and Squiggle. In November 2014 Mobile Mouse and Autodesk's Sketchbook were added to the list of Pencil-ready apps, followed by Microsoft OneNote, Adobe Illustrator Draw, Adobe Photoshop Sketch, PicsArt Photo Studio, Tayasui Sketches, Astropad, PDFpen 2, Flowpaper, and ZoomNotes in 2015.

In September 2014 FiftyThree updated Pencil for iOS 8 and introduced Surface Pressure. Surface Pressure changes the variance of the lines drawn in Paper based on responsive transitions between Pencil's broad edge and tip.

FiftyThree discontinued its hardware business in 2016.

=== Book ===
In October 2013 FiftyThree launched Book in collaboration with Moleskine. Book is a 15-page, custom-printed, foldout notebook of a user's Paper sketches. It is a newly invented format and the first time Moleskine created a journal to exactly match the iPad's 4×3 aspect ratio. The pages in Book are made from sustainable paper and use HP Indigo 4-color digital printing. The cover and spine image and color are customizable. Customers order Books from within the Paper app. As of September 2015, the Book service was discontinued.

=== Paste ===
Paste is a paid presentation program released in 2017, and designed for enterprise clients. The app is available for iOS and on the web.

== Recognition ==
Paper by FiftyThree was named App of the Year by Apple in 2012. In 2012, Paper also won an Apple Design Award, a Crunchie Award for Best Design, and was an AIGA Design winner.

In 2013, Paper won the IxDA Interaction Award, IDSA's Gold IDEA award, and was recognized by Communication Arts in its Interactive Design Annual. Time Inc. also featured FiftyThree in their annual list of 10 NYC Startups To Watch.

In 2014, Pencil by FiftyThree won a Crunchie for Best Design, an IDSA Silver IDEA award in the Computer Equipment category, and an IDEA Gold for Packaging. Book by FiftyThree and Moleskine won IDSA's Gold IDEA award for Digital Design.

In 2015, Mix won Communication Arts' Interactive Annual in the tablets/handheld device category, and won Bronze at the Edison Awards in the Collaborative Services category.

== See also ==
- Apple Pencil
