= 53rd Transportation Battalion =

Transportation battalion of the United States Army

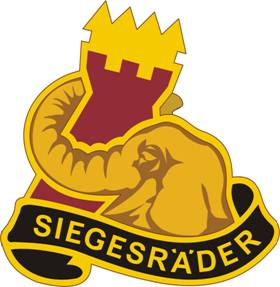
Distinctive unit insignia

The 53rd Transportation Battalion (Movement Control) was as US Army unit, which was inactivated on 10 April 2025. The battalion was assigned to the 593rd Expeditionary Sustainment Command at JBLM, Washington . The structure of the battalion has shifted over time with the deployment of units and reassignment to the 593rd ESC. Today the Battalion includes the Headquarters and Headquarters Detachment (HHD), six Movement Control Teams (70th, 99th, 271st, 384th, 612th, and 622nd), and two Inland Cargo Transfer Companies (155 and 567). The battalion also has administrative control of four Engineer Dive Detachments (74th, 86th, 511th, and 569th).

Since 2001, the battalion has experienced a near constant rotation of units into and out of the CENTCOM area of responsibility with the headquarters and subordinate units deploying to Afghanistan, Iraq, and Kuwait as part of Operations Enduring Freedom, Iraqi Freedom, and New Dawn. Most recently, the battalion headquarters returned from a deployment to Liberia as part of Operation United Assistance and the response to the West African Ebola outbreak.

The MCB is a functional transportation battalion that executes movement control in its assigned area of operation. It provides mission command over four to ten MCT spread throughout its area of operation. The MCB oversees the committing of Army theater common user transportation and is responsible for regulating Army movement on theater controlled MSRs and ASRs. The MCB is directly subordinate to the TSC/ESC and is a vital component in assisting in the planning and execution of deployment, redeployment, and distribution operations.

The Movement Control Team (MCT) is designed to execute five movement control missions: 1) intermodal 2) area 3) movement regulation 4) documentation and 5) division support (see chapter 5). The commits allocated transportation assets, regulates movement, and provides transportation services in a theater of operation. MCTs are positioned throughout the theater to assist in the decentralized execution of movement control responsibilities.

The Inland Cargo Transfer Companies (ICTC) provide material handling and cargo management at a variety of locations, ensuring accountability and efficient movement of cargo to end destination. The company can manage intermodal transfer points including rail yards, airfields, seaports, and central receiving and shipping points.

Lineage

- Constituted 28 May 1943 in the Army of the United States as Headquarters and Headquarters Detachment, 53d Quartermaster Truck Battalion
- Activated 22 June 1943 in North Africa
- Reorganized and redesignated 22 May 1944 as Headquarters and Headquarters Detachment, 53d Quartermaster Battalion, Mobile
- Inactivated 12 November 1945 in Germany
- Converted and redesignated 1 August 1946 as Headquarters and Headquarters Detachment, 53d Transportation Corps Truck Battalion, and activated at Fort Sill, Oklahoma
- Redesignated 16 May 1947 as Headquarters and Headquarters Detachment, 53d Transportation Truck Battalion
- Reorganized and redesignated 3 May 1949 as Headquarters and Headquarters Company, 53d Transportation Truck Battalion, and allotted to the Regular Army
- Reorganized and redesignated 1 April 1953 as Headquarters and Headquarters Company, 53d Transportation Battalion
- Redesignated 19 June 1959 as Headquarters and Headquarters Detachment, 53d Transportation Battalion
- Inactivated 15 September 1995 in Germany
- Activated 16 November 1999 at Fort McPherson, Georgia

Campaign Participation Credit

- World War II: Sicily (with arrowhead); Naples-Foggia; Anzio (with arrowhead); Rome-Arno; Southern France (with arrowhead); Rhineland; Central Europe
- War on Terrorism: Global War on Terrorism

Decorations

- Meritorious Unit Commendation (Army) 2014
- Meritorious Unit Commendation (Army) 2003
- Army Superior Unit Award for 1986
- Army Superior Unit Award for 2014-2015

Distinctive Unit Insignia

"Brick red and golden yellow (gold) are the colors traditionally associated with the Transportation Corps. The heavy equipment (truck) of the organization is symbolized by the elephant and the tower, indigenous to Europe, the general area in which the unit served during World War II. The four arrowheads allude to the four assault landings made the Battalion." Referring to the Battalion's long term service in Germany, SIEGESRÄDER translates as "Victory Wheels."
