= Smash (file transfer service) =

File transfer service

Smash & Co
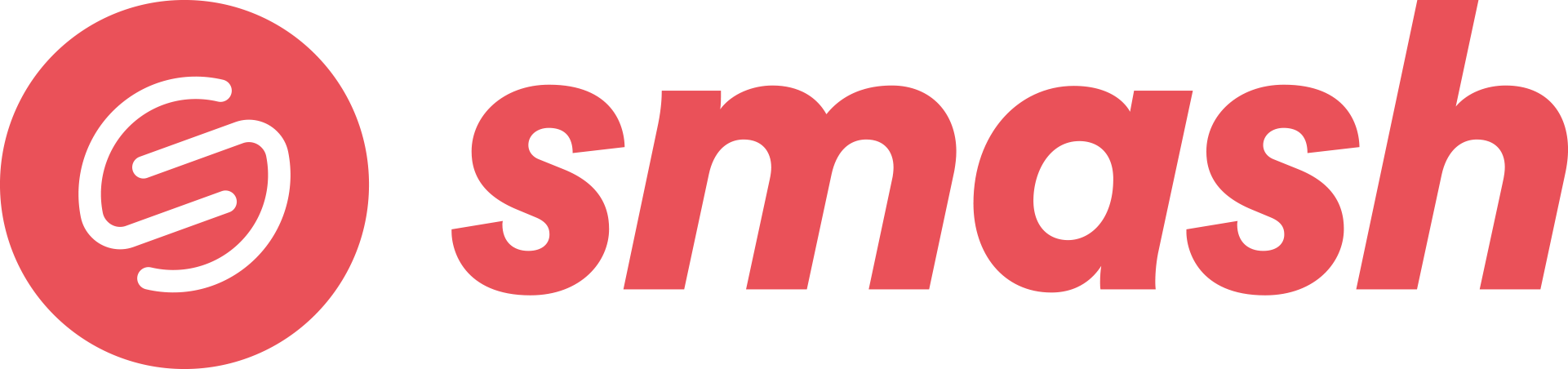
- Trade name: Smash
- Founded: 2017
- Founder: Romaric Gouedard-Comte
- Headquarters: Lyon, France
- Area served: Worldwide
- Services: File transfer
- Website: fromsmash.com

Smash is an online file transfer service of French origin, launched in 2017 in Lyon by Romaric and Rémi Gouedard-Comte. Smash allows sending large files via a web interface or dedicated applications, offering a free service without size limits and paid plans aimed at professionals.

== History ==
Smash was launched in 2017 in Lyon to compete with WeTransfer by eliminating limitations on the size of transferred files. In 2019, Smash completed its first funding round, raising 1.5 million euros to accelerate its development in France and internationally.

In 2020, driven by the increase in remote work, Smash surpassed one million users across 190 countries and launched its first mobile and desktop applications.

In 2023, Smash launched its API for developers looking to automate large file workflows.

== Features ==
Smash allows the sending of files without size limits, accessible for free for 7 days. Files larger than 2 GB are processed with lower priority. Smash has direct streaming previews of sent files (video, audio, images).

The service offers encryption during transfers, the ability to password-protect files, and claims to comply with GDPR, with its servers based all around Europe.

In 2024, Smash released a plugin for Microsoft Outlook that enables users to easily send large files directly from their email client, bypassing traditional attachment size limits through seamless integration with the Smash file transfer service.

== Revenue model ==
Smash adopts a freemium model. Its free offering is financed by the discreet display of partner content during uploads. Paid subscriptions (Pro, Team) offer extended file availability durations, interface customization, and priority processing for large sends.

== Critical response ==
Smash has received positive reception in France, recognized for its simplicity, lack of strict size limits, and clean interface. Clubic awarded it a score of 9/10 in 2025, highlighting its performance and its location in France. However, the absence of end-to-end encryption is sometimes noted as a weakness.

== See also ==
- WeTransfer
- File sharing
