= 53rd Division =

53rd Division or 53rd Infantry Division may refer to:

- 53rd Division (1st Formation) (People's Republic of China), 1949–1957
- 53rd Infantry Division (France)
- 53rd Reserve Division (German Empire)
- 53rd Infantry Division "Arezzo", Italy, World War II
- 53rd Division (Imperial Japanese Army)
- 53rd Infantry Division (Russian Empire)
- 53rd Guards Motor Rifle Division, Soviet Union
- 53rd Guards Rifle Division, Soviet Union
- 53rd Rifle Division, Soviet Union
- 53rd (Welsh) Infantry Division, a British division of World Wars I and II
- 53 Division (Sri Lanka)

== See also ==
- List of military divisions by number
- 53rd Brigade (disambiguation)
- 53rd Regiment (disambiguation)
- 53rd Battalion (disambiguation)
- 53rd Squadron (disambiguation)
