= WeTransfer =

Cloud-based file transfer service

WeTransfer B.V.
- Type: Private
- Industry: Software
- Founded: 2009; 17 years ago
- Founders: Rinke Visser; Bas Beerens; Ronald Hans
- Headquarters: Amsterdam, Netherlands
- Area served: Worldwide
- Key people: Alexandar Vassilev (CEO); Martha Lane Fox (chair); Damian Bradfield (CCO)
- Services: SaaS
- Revenue: €72m (2021)
- Owner: Bending Spoons
- Number of employees: 350+ (2024)
- Website: wetransfer.com/explore/

WeTransfer B.V. is a Dutch Internet-based computer file transfer service company that was founded in 2009 and based in Amsterdam. In 2024, the company was acquired by Bending Spoons.

== History ==
=== Early history ===
WeTransfer was founded in 2009 by Rinke Visser, Bas Beerens and Ronald Hans (Nalden) in Amsterdam, Netherlands. It was created to enable the sharing of large files (up to 2 GB) free of charge.

In 2012, WeTransfer implemented a re-design and introduced a paid-for 'Plus' tier with support for larger file transfers.

In 2014, WeTransfer launched "creative-class.tv", an ongoing video series. The company initiated its first bursaries that year through a collaborative partnership with Central Saint Martins. These scholarships supported two students from around the globe in their full-time studies.

In 2015, WeTransfer raised a US$25 million Series A funding round from Highland Capital Partners Europe. They also added venture capitalist Troy Carter to its board.

=== 2016–2022 ===
In 2016, WeTransfer announced the acquisition of digital design studio Present Plus, established in 2010 by Damian Bradfield and WeTransfer co-founder Nalden. In September, WeTransfer opened its first office in the United States at Venice Beach, Los Angeles.

In early 2017, Gordon Willoughby became the company's Chief Executive Officer, taking over from Bas Beerens, who became Executive Chairman.

In January 2018, WeTransfer launched a content arm called "WePresent". In August, WeTransfer acquired app developer FiftyThree, owner of sketching app Paper and collaborative presentation app Paste. In October, WeTransfer relaunched its mobile app under the name "Collect by WeTransfer".

In June 2019, WeTransfer experienced a security incident in which files were "sent to the wrong people". In August, the company closed a €35 million secondary funding round led by HPE Growth.

In May 2020, India banned WeTransfer, citing security reasons. In June, the company became a certified B Corporation.

In February 2021, WeTransfer claimed to have achieved carbon-neutral certification, having pledged the previous year to reduce emissions by 30% by 2025. In March, the 2020 short film "The Long Goodbye" by Aneil Karia and Riz Ahmed commissioned by WeTransfer through WePresent won the 2022 Academy Award for Best Live Action Short Film. In April, the company launched a charitable arm known as "Supporting Act", focused on helping emerging creative talent, pledging to donate 1% of revenues from 2022 onwards. In October, WeTransfer announced sales in 2020 of €65m.

In April 2021, Reuters reported that the WeTransfer logos and likeness were used in high-profile phishing scams.

In January 2022, WeTransfer planned for an IPO for a valuation of up to $800 million but ended up canceling the offering shortly before listing citing market volatility.

In 2022, Alexandar Vassilev took over as the company's Chief Executive Officer.

In May 2023, WeTransfer announced it reduced 78% of server emissions as part of its environmental commitments.

=== Sale to Bending Spoons ===
In July 2024 Italian technology company Bending Spoons announced that it would acquire WeTransfer.

In early September 2024, Bending Spoons' CEO Luca Ferrari announced that WeTransfer would be having layoffs, with 'up to 3/4 of the jobs' likely to be cut.

== Leadership ==
Bas Beerens founded the file-sharing platform WeTransfer with Nalden (Ronald Hans) and Rinke Visser in 2009.

Damian Bradfield joined the company as a "founding shareholder" in 2010. Bradfield is currently WeTransfer's Chief Creative Officer.

Chief Executive Gordon Willoughby joined WeTransfer in January 2017. He announced his departure from the company in May 2022 and was replaced by former Chief Technology Officer Alexandar Vassilev.

Chief Financial Officer Melissa Nussbaum joined WeTransfer from King in September 2020.

Martha Lane Fox joined WeTransfer as chair in July 2020.

== Technology ==
WeTransfer is based on Amazon's infrastructure and technology. It uses Amazon S3 for storage and for sending files.

=== Services ===
WeTransfer offers a free, limited service, and a paid option called "Pro" where users can send and store more data.

== Revenue model ==
WeTransfer has a dual revenue model split between advertising and premium ("pro") subscriptions.

WeTransfer displays full-screen advertisements while transferring instead of banner ads. The company donated 30% of the advertising inventory to creatives and charitable causes.

== Controversies ==
In July 2025, WeTransfer received criticism after changing its terms of service, which some interpreted as allowing it the right to use files for AI training. The specific passage said that using WeTransfer gave the company the right to use the data "for the purposes of operating, developing, commercializing, and improving the Service or new technologies or services, including to improve performance of machine learning models that enhance our content moderation process, in accordance with the Privacy & Cookie Policy." In response, WeTransfer clarified its terms of service by removing any mention of machine learning.

== See also ==
- Comparison of file hosting services
- Smash (file transfer service)
