= 18th Royal Garhwal Rifles =

- Active: 1922–1947
- Country: British India
- Branch: British Indian Army
- Type: Infantry
- Engagements: World War II

The 18th Royal Garhwal Rifles was an infantry regiment of the British Indian Army. It was formed in 1922, after the Indian government decided to reform the army, moving away from single-battalion regiments to multi-battalion regiments. They were the only Indian Infantry regiment to remain intact without being amalgamated. They were renumbered 18th Royal Garhwal Rifles with three active battalions and the 4th battalion becoming the 10th training battalion. After the partition of India in 1947, it was allocated to the new Indian Army and renamed The Garhwal Rifles.

== World War II (1939–45) ==
During World War II, five more battalions of the Garhwal Rifles were raised. These were: the 4th (re-raised having been converted into a training battalion and designated 10th Battalion earlier), the 5th, 6th, 7th and 25th (Garrison) battalion. The Regiment saw active service in almost all of the theatres of the war, including: Burma, Malaya, Egypt, Iraq, Eritrea, Abyssinia. Many soldiers of 5/18 Garhwal Rifles deployed in Malaya, left and joined Indian National Army and fought in Burma against the British from 1942 to 1945.

The 2nd and 5th Battalions were captured in the fall of Singapore and remained in captivity until the end of the war.

The Regiment's casualties during the war were high, with some 350 killed and approximately 1,400 wounded.

Following the war the 1st and 3rd Battalions served briefly in a garrison role in Sumatra and Italy before returning to India. The 4th Battalion was used to reconstitute the 2nd Battalion in May 1946. The 5th Battalion was not raised again and the 6th Battalion was disbanded at war's end.

== Formation ==
- 1st battalion ex 1/39th Garhwal Rifles
- 2nd battalion ex 2/39th Gahwal Rifles
- 3rd battalion ex 3/39th Gahwal Rifles
- 10th (Training) battalion ex 4/39th Gahwal Rifles

== Sources ==
- "Punjab Regiment". Bharat-Rakshak.com. Archived from the original on 8 April 2009.
- "The Punjab Regiment [Pakistan]". regiments.org. Archived from the original on 11 October 2007.
- Sharma, Gautam. 1990. Valour and Sacrifice: Famous Regiments of the Indian Army. Allied Publishers. ISBN 81-7023-140-X.
