= 53rd Regiment =

53rd Regiment or 53rd Infantry Regiment may refer to:

- 53rd (Napier's) Regiment of Foot, a unit of the British Army
- 53rd (Shropshire) Regiment of Foot, a unit of the British Army
- 53rd Sikhs (Frontier Force), a unit of the British Indian Army
- 53rd (City of London) Heavy Anti-Aircraft Regiment, Royal Artillery
- 53rd Anti-Aircraft Missile Regiment (Romania)
- 53rd Coast Artillery Regiment, a unit of the United States Army
- 53rd Infantry Regiment (Imperial Japanese Army)
- 53rd Infantry Regiment (United States)
- 53rd Coast Artillery Regiment, United States

== American Civil War regiments ==
- 53rd Alabama Cavalry Regiment, a unit of the Confederate States Army

=== Union Army ===
- 53rd Illinois Infantry Regiment
- 53rd Indiana Infantry Regiment
- 53rd Kentucky Mounted Infantry Regiment
- 53rd Massachusetts Infantry Regiment
- 53rd Ohio Infantry Regiment
- 53rd Pennsylvania Infantry Regiment
- 53rd Wisconsin Infantry Regiment

== See also ==
- 53rd Division (disambiguation)
