= Florence Baker =

Hungarian-born British explorer (1841–1916)

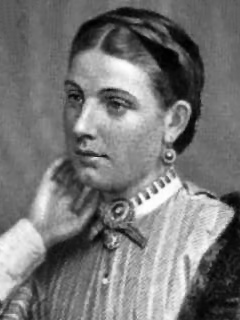
- Born: Florence Barbara Maria von Sass; 6 August 1841; Nagyenyed, Principality of Transylvania, Austrian Empire
- Died: 11 March 1916 (aged 74); Newton Abbot, Devon, England
- Other names: Florence Barbara Marie Finnian; Maria Freiin von Sass
- Known for: an orphan who became a slave, explored the Nile, and died an English lady
- Spouse: Sir Samuel Baker

Florence, Lady Baker, or Florence Barbara Marie Finnian: or Florica Maria Sas; or Maria Freiin von Sas; (Hungarian: Sass Flóra) (6 August 1841 – 11 March 1916) was a Transylvanian-born ethnic Hungarian British explorer. Born in Transylvania (then part of the Lands of the Hungarian Crown), she became an orphan when her parents and brother were murdered by the Romanian marauders led by Ioan Axente Sever.

She fled with the remnants of the Hungarian army to the Ottoman Empire, settling in Vidin. There, she was sold as a slave in 1859. Years later, Samuel Baker encountered her during a visit to the Vidin white slave auction. Florence, a white slave girl destined for the Ottoman Pasha of Vidin, caught Baker’s eye. Although outbid by the Pasha, Baker bribed her guards, and the two escaped together. Florence became Baker’s companion and later his wife. They reportedly married, likely in Bucharest, before holding a formal family wedding in England in 1865.

Together, they explored Africa in search of the source of the Nile and discovered Lake Albert. Florence later joined Baker in his efforts to combat the slave trade in Africa. The couple eventually retired to Devon, where they lived until their deaths.

== Early life ==
Some sources say that Florence Baker began life in 1841 in Nagyenyed, Principality of Transylvania (today Aiud, Romania) as Barbara Maria von Sas. The story handed down in the Baker family is that she was the daughter of a Székely officer from a Hungarian noble family, who had estates in Transylvania, called von Sas (a branch of the von Sass family) and whilst she was young, during the Hungarian Revolution of 1848 "her father and brothers had been killed before her eyes". As an adolescent, she spoke Hungarian, German, Romanian, and Turkish. She was sold as a slave in Vidin, a town and fortified port on the River Danube in what was then the Ottoman Empire and is now in Bulgaria, in January 1859. According to certain accounts, she was destined to be owned by the Pasha of Vidin, but she had been spotted by Samuel Baker. He and Maharaja Duleep Singh were both on a hunting trip. It was said that Samuel Baker bribed the guards and Florence was allowed to escape into his ownership, but later accounts said that Samuel Baker simply bought her.

== Africa ==
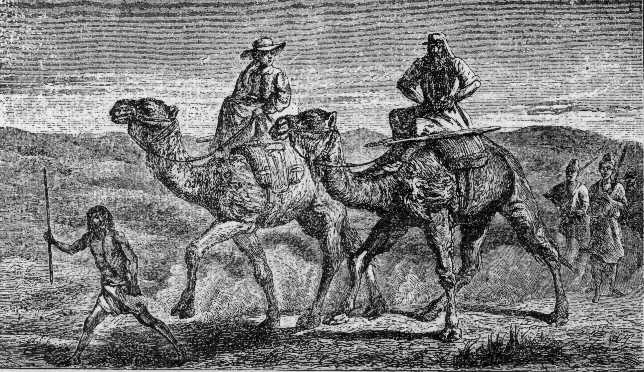
Florence and Samuel White Baker as illustrated in a book of 1890

Samuel Baker took her to Africa where he was leading an expedition to find the source of the River Nile. They travelled up the Nile to Gondokoro in present-day South Sudan where Florence saved the expedition. There was a dispute between her husband's inflexibility and the staff's disloyalty. Florence was able to intercede and find some common agreement. Gondokoro was a base for ivory and slaves, and the point where boats could go no further and where they would need to travel to the source on foot. There they met Speke and Grant who told them of their explorations. They suggested that they investigate another branch of the Nile. When Speke and Grant both later wrote down accounts of their voyages neither of them mentioned that Baker had Florence with him. This was in line with an agreement they made with Samuel Baker.

Florence and Samuel Baker discovered Murchison Falls and Lake Albert in what is now Uganda.

Arriving in England, they lived at Hedenham Hall in Norfolk.

They were married on 4 November 1865 at St James's Church, Piccadilly, when Florence’s name was given as Florence Barbara Marie Finnian and the name of her father as "Matthew Finnian, Gentleman decd."

When Samuel Baker was knighted she became Lady Baker. The details of how they met was meant to be kept secret but the story circulated and this resulted in Queen Victoria deciding to exclude Baker from court.

In 1869 Samuel was invited by Isma'il Pasha, the Turkish Viceroy of Egypt, to return to Africa to help eliminate or reduce the trade in slaves around Gondokoro. Samuel was made Governor General of the Equatorial Nile. Accepting the invitation, they returned to Africa where they attempted to gain the upper hand. Florence served as the medic and when they were defeated at Bunyoro she was there carrying rifles and brandy in addition to two umbrellas and a pistol.

== Later life ==
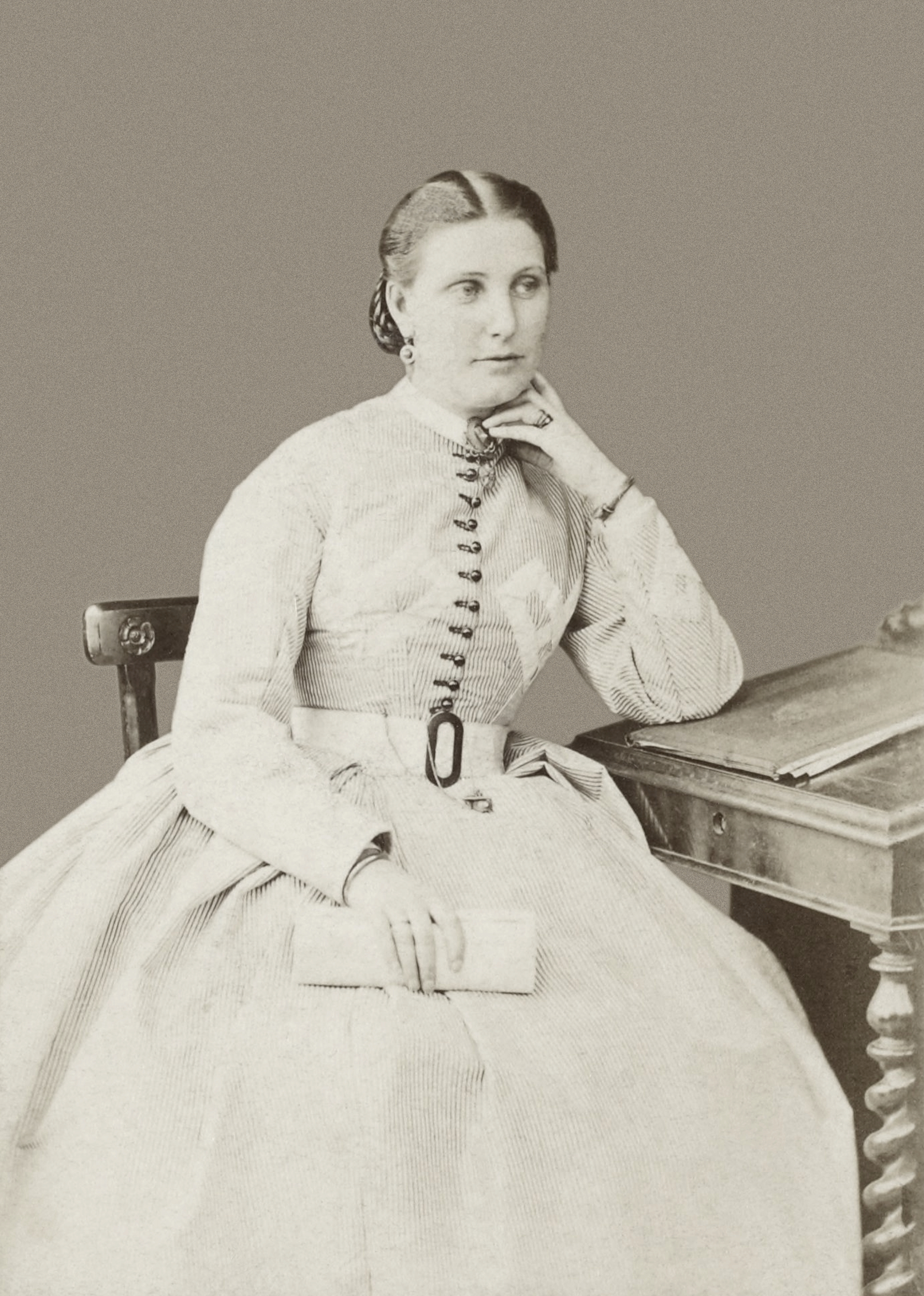
Florence, Lady Baker c. 1875

In 1873 she and her husband started living at their house, Sandford Orleigh, at Newton Abbot in Devon. General Gordon arrived in February 1883 and requested that Samuel assist him in evacuating people from the besieged Khartoum during the Mahdist War in Egypt. Florence would be required on such a journey. However, Florence would not go back to Africa and her husband would not travel without her. Sir Samuel Baker died in 1893.

In the 1901 United Kingdom census, Florence B. M. Baker was still living at Sandford, Orleigh, Highweek, and her age was stated as 58, her place of birth as Hungary. She was living with Ethel L. Baker, a 46-year-old step-daughter and eight servants, including a cook and a footman.

Florence Baker died in Devon of a heart attack, and was buried with the remains of her husband in the family vault at Grimley, near Worcester.

== Legacy ==
The Bakers appear in a painting called "Samuel Baker (1821–93) and the Discovery of Lake Albert" by Severino Baraldi.

Together with Delia Akeley, Christina Dodwell, Mary Kingsley and Alexine Tinne, she was one of the five subjects chosen for a 1997 book on women explorers in Africa.

A memorial plaque commemorating her travels was unveiled by László Kövér, Speaker of the Hungarian National Assembly on 4 March 2019. He and Ephraim Kamuntu were there on the 155th anniversary of her trip to search for the source of the Nile. The memorial plaque is on the shore of the Nile, in the Murchison Falls National Park in Uganda and it was organised by the African-Hungarian Union and the Kenya's Hungarian embassy.
