= Selim Qapudan =

Nizami Djedid Néféri Kapudan Muhammad Selim Pasha
- Born: Crete, Ottoman Empire
- Died: Khedivate of Egypt
- Occupations: Explorer, officer, Geographer, author
- Notable work: Exploration of the White Nile; Discovery of the mouth of the Sobat River; Discovery of Bahr al-Jabal

Muhammad Selim Qapudan or Salim Kapudan or Salim Qabūdān (Arabic: سليم قبودان), was an Egyptian geographer and naval officer whose name is closely associated with the major 19th-century exploration expeditions of the Nile River basin. Born in Crete, Greece, to a family of Turkish-Circassian origins originating from Ankara, he moved to Egypt during his youth with his family, where they settled. He later joined the Egyptian Navy during the reign of Muhammad Ali Pasha, the Wali of Egypt, rising through the military ranks. He worked as an officer at the Alexandria Naval Shipyard and was later promoted to the rank of Kapudan Pasha.

He achieved his scientific and historical prominence when Muhammad Ali Pasha entrusted him with leading three major scientific exploration expeditions between 1839 and 1842 into equatorial Africa to discover the sources of the Nile River. By virtue of these commissions, he pioneered the dispatch and command of exploration campaigns to the sources of the White Nile, preceding the expeditions later launched by European explorers into the region. These expeditions successfully reached the thresholds of the river's equatorial course for the first time, produced the earliest maps of the White Nile's path, and documented detailed hydrographic, astronomical, and ethnographic observations regarding the nature of the discovered regions and the tribes inhabiting them, as well as introducing Islam among them.

The field geographical expeditions he commanded yielded decisive scientific results that altered prevailing geographical concepts of the time. They contributed to completely dismantling the ancient hypothesis that the sources of the White Nile lay toward West Africa. Furthermore, the findings of these voyages refuted previous geographical and historical notions, particularly the account by the geographer Al-Idrisi regarding the Nile originating from the "Mountains of the Moon" to the south, as field explorations proved that these mountains did not exist in reality. Consequently, his reports became a cornerstone of modern knowledge regarding the equatorial Nile Basin. His discoveries also served as an essential foundation upon which European geographers and explorers later relied to map modern Africa, and his work paved the way for subsequent Egyptian military, political, and economic expansion into the African continent during the reign of Khedive Ismail.

== Early life ==
The precise details of Salim Kapudan's early life remain shrouded in mystery; the works and reports of the European explorers who accompanied him on his expeditions did not extensively cover the details of his childhood and beginnings. However, it is known that he had Cretan origins (from the Greek island of Crete) as well as Circassian ancestry. He was also known to have Turkish roots, as his family descended from the city of Ankara in Anatolia. He arrived in Egypt, integrated into Egyptian society, and mingled with its people until he became Egyptian. He was educated in Egyptian schools and enrolled in the Naval School, where he excelled and became one of the top students, completing his education in England. He then graduated to join the Egyptian Navy during the reign of Wali Muhammad Ali Pasha, working as a naval officer at the Alexandria Shipyard. He was promoted through the military ranks, becoming a Binbashi (major) when he was commissioned for his first voyage, and then a Qaimaqam (colonel) after completing his three voyages, additionally receiving the title of Bey. He eventually reached the rank of Kapudan Pasha later on.

== Character and personality ==
Historical sources accompanying the White Nile exploration expeditions provide nuanced details about the character and administrative style of Muhammad Salim Kapudan. Professionally, he was a highly experienced naval officer skilled in navigation, having worked at the Alexandria Shipyard. The German engineer Ferdinand Werne described him as intelligent, courageous, active, deeply aware of his responsibilities, and ambitious. Werne also noted his physical build, describing him as a sturdy man of commanding presence.

Administratively, he was characterized by tact and reservation in his conversations with the engineers and his companions, making sure to consult them on important matters as an essential factor for the mission's success and to avoid disputes. He adhered to the principle of consultation and rejected tyranny; he frequently convened collective councils that included officers, engineers, and soldiers to make majority-vote decisions when facing natural crises, as happened near the confluence of the Sobat River and when the expedition turned back south of "Jankir" Island (located in present-day South Sudan). In his dealings with local tribes, he favored diplomacy and peaceful solutions, sending interpreters and offering gifts to avoid military clashes. At the same time, he was firm in enforcing military regulations, punishing negligence among his men, and strictly prohibiting any encroachment on the property of the local inhabitants.

Regarding his personal faith, he was a practicing Muslim known for his religious commitment. He consistently began his official reports with praise and gratitude to God, was diligent in performing his prayers at their designated times, and logged the expedition's journals using both the Hijri and Gregorian dates alongside astronomical tables. He also insisted on fasting the entire month of Ramadan with his men despite the hardships of travel, and ensured that military and religious celebrations for Eid al-Fitr and Eid al-Adha were observed in the middle of the Nile River by firing cannons, raising flags, and performing congregational prayers on deck.

== Exploratory expeditions ==
Between 1839 and 1842, Muhammad Ali Pasha dispatched Salim Kapudan on three scientific and military exploration expeditions to discover the main course of the Nile River and explore its geographic sources in Equatorial Africa, as well as to study the conditions of the tribes inhabiting its banks. This campaign coincided with increased international and Egyptian interest in geographical discoveries within the Nile Basin following Muhammad Ali Pasha's visit to Sudan (1838–1839). These efforts emulated the famous ancient kings of Egypt, and many describe them as the earliest fruits of the civilization that was reawakened in Egypt.

=== First expedition (1839–1840) ===
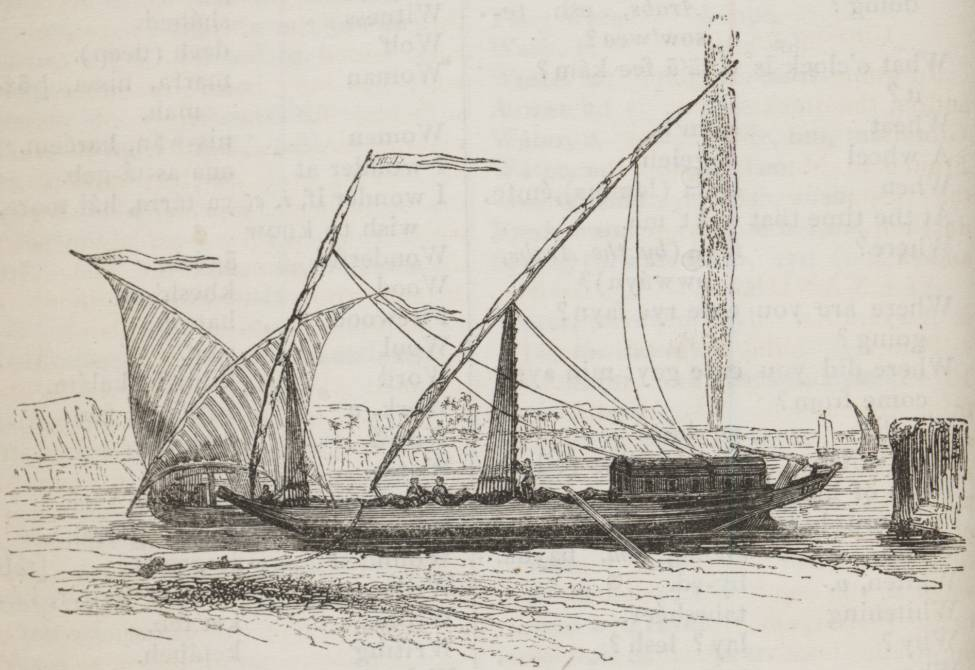
A painting of an Egyptian Dahabeah from the contemporary period of Salim Kapudan, 1847.

The expedition set out from the city of Khartoum on 16 November 1839, and returned on 30 March 1840 (lasting 135 days). It is considered the first organized scientific attempt that established the physical geography and ethnography database relied upon later by European explorers to solve the mystery of the Nile's sources. In the introduction of his official report, the mission commander, Bimbashi Salim Kapudan, defined the objectives of the journey as follows:

- Exploring the course of the White Nile flowing through the southern regions of Sudan and investigating the main sources of the river.
- Studying the customs, traditions, and beliefs of the various peoples and tribes inhabiting the eastern and western banks of the river.
- Completing the physical geographical data and maps that ancient expeditions had failed to fulfill.

The expedition consisted of logistical and military preparations to ensure its safety in remote regions that were outside the effective influence of the Egyptian administration at the time, and included:

- A military force consisting of 400 soldiers from the First and Second Infantry Regiments stationed in Sennar, and this force was placed under the military command of Sulayman Kashef.
- A river fleet consisting of 5 armed Egyptian dahabeahs (each carrying two cannons), 3 dahabeahs from Sennar, two qayashis (single-masted vessels), and 15 boats laden with military ammunition and food provisions sufficient for eight months.
- Salim Kapudan was accompanied by a technical and scientific team under his leadership, and the mission was equipped with scientific instruments to measure temperatures, channel depth, current speed, and wind direction. Yuzbashi Faydullah Effendi oversaw navigation affairs, while the French expert Monsieur Thibaut (who went by the name Ibrahim Effendi al-Shayqi) was the only European expert to accompany this first journey, due to his prior knowledge of the territories of the Shilluk tribe.
- The boats carried ample amounts of gifts and novelties (such as clothes made of Indian cloth, Mosul silk, cashmere belts, and colored glass beads) to win over the tribal chiefs. The mission was also accompanied by translating elders from the Shilluk and Dinka tribes to facilitate linguistic communication.

=== Second expedition (1840–1841) ===
Wali Muhammad Ali Pasha ordered the dispatch of a major second exploratory mission at the expense of the Egyptian government, led by Salim Kapudan. The goal was to complete the exploration of the White Nile's course and reach the equatorial sources of the Nile River, after the first expedition failed to overcome the river's vegetation barriers despite the discoveries it had achieved. Additionally, the Wali desired to ascertain the natural and commercial resources of the vast territories situated south of the Egyptian political borders in Turco-Egyptian Sudan at the time.

The expedition departed from the city of Khartoum on 23 November 1840 and returned on 18 May 1841, successfully breaching the river barriers and surpassing the terminus of the previous mission. This resulted in the discovery of new regions and tribes that had never been scientifically explored before, laying the true foundation for solving the geographical question of the African sources of the Nile. The expedition was prepared to be more equipped and precise than its predecessor, comprising the following military and technical structures:

- The supreme command was entrusted to Muhammad Salim Kapudan himself, followed by Captain Faydullah Effendi, while the scientific and topographical leadership was assigned to the French engineers Joseph-Pons d'Arnaud and Sabatier. The German engineer Ferdinand Werne also accompanied the mission at his own expense as a scientific and geographical advisor.
- The river fleet consisted of four dahabeahs designed in Cairo, three dahabeahs from Khartoum, and two qayashis, alongside small boats for transportation and depth sounding.
- The military and service force included 370 individuals; among them were 250 soldiers of Egyptians, Syrians, and Sudanese, and 120 sailors from Alexandria, Nubia, and Sudan. The organization of the military forces was again entrusted to Sulayman Kashef.
- The vessels were laden with provisions and foodstuffs sufficient for ten months, and the commander was accompanied by local interpreters, most notably the interpreter Dashwal, who belonged to the Kik tribe and was highly regarded for his intelligence and capability to communicate with the local populations.

=== Third expedition (1841–1843) ===
This was the final and concluding exploratory mission in the series of campaigns dispatched by the Egyptian government under the orders of Wali Muhammad Ali Pasha to trace the equatorial course of the White Nile and settle the question of the Nile's sources. The expedition departed from the city of Khartoum on 27 September 1841 and returned on 6 March 1843. This journey is considered the least documented in terms of published history compared to the first and second expeditions, as its memoirs were not officially published at the time. The third expedition represented a persistent attempt by the Egyptian administration, driven by the significant achievements of the second campaign, which had reached the borders of the Equator at Jankir Island. Upon learning the results of the second voyage, Muhammad Ali Pasha issued his command to Salim Kapudan:

I have observed that you extended your journey further this year than the first time. It is my hope that this year you will complete your work in full perfection. Proceed under God's protection and return in safety.

However, Ahmad Pasha, the Governor-General (Hikmdar) of Turco-Egyptian Sudan, did not support the expedition with the necessary equipment as ordered by the Wali. The campaign consisted of the following military and logistical preparations:

- A military force including 400 Sudanese infantrymen and sailors to protect the river fleet in those remote regions.
- 10 boats armed with small naval cannons.
- Salim Kapudan retained his supreme and navigational command of the mission, and he was accompanied once again by the French engineer Joseph-Pons d'Arnaud as the technical and scientific officer tasked with assisting him in recording observations and drawing maps and geographical sketches of the newly discovered areas.

The expedition sailed southward, following the same navigational path of the White Nile. It successfully covered vast distances amid challenging climatic conditions and swamp diseases until it reached the furthest geographical points attained by the previous campaign. However, the mission encountered the same natural and geographical obstacles; the rocks and cataracts located south of "Jankir" Island (near Gondokoro) along with low water levels prevented the armed Egyptian dahabeahs and boats from crossing and advancing further south toward the African Great Lakes region. Consequently, the expedition halted at latitude 4° 42' north of the Equator, unable to overcome the rocky barrier of Gondokoro, after enduring severe hardships and perils, and losing many soldiers and men. Additionally, d'Arnaud himself lost his personal belongings, scientific papers, and maps, which sank near the second cataract.

== Results of his voyages and scientific discoveries ==
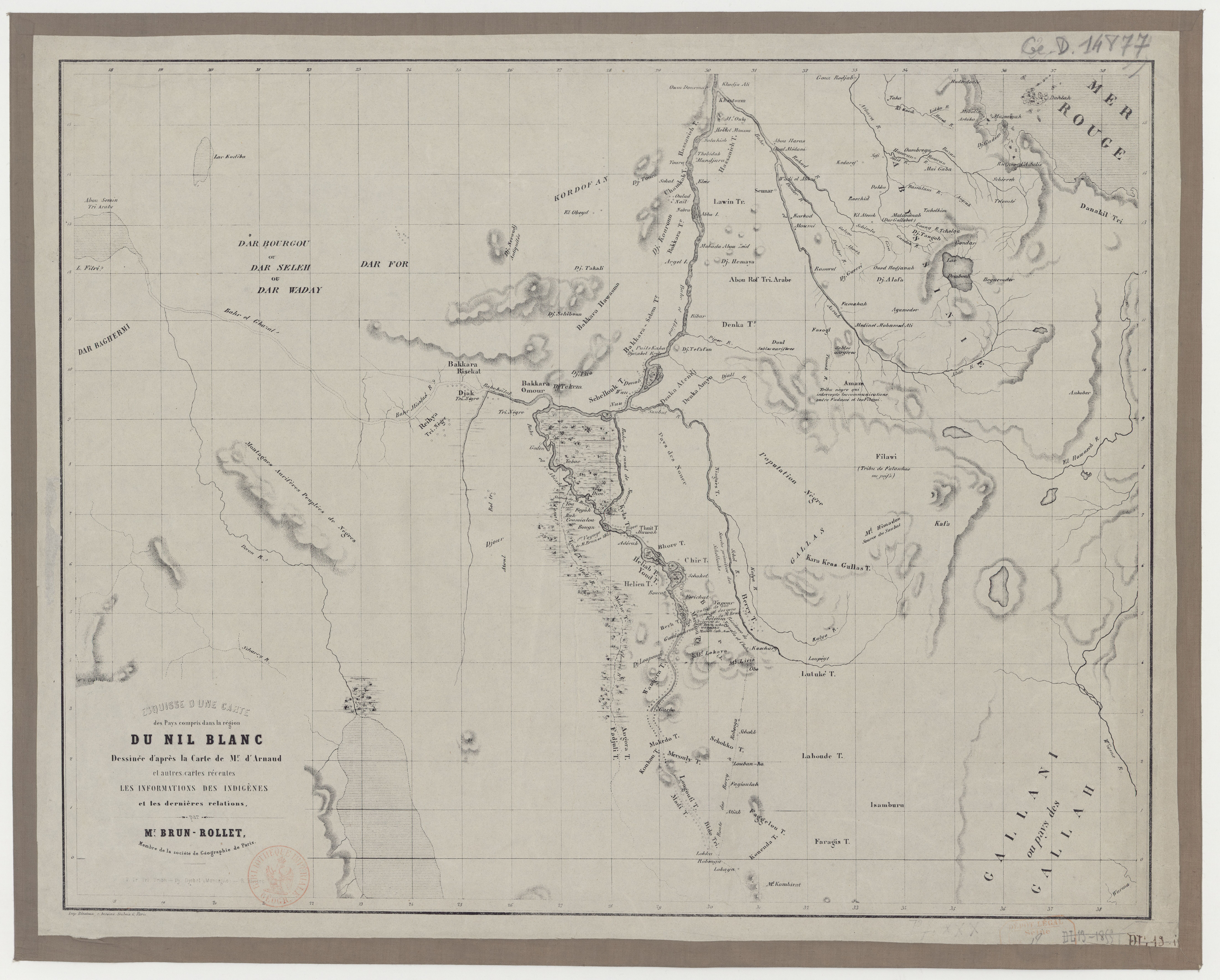
A topographic map showing the discoveries of the second and third expeditions of Muhammad Salim Kapudan along the White Nile.

The new information brought to light by Salim Kapudan's expeditions between 1839 and 1842 stirred commercial entities, organizations, and scientific societies worldwide, stimulating them to discover the regions through which the Nile River flows. His voyages paved the way for further exploratory expeditions, particularly by European explorers, though he did not reach the equatorial sources of the Nile. Among the most significant findings and proofs established by Salim Kapudan was that the White Nile is the primary branch of the Nile, and that a long watercourse flows from the south, distinct from the Blue Nile which joins the White Nile after flowing out of Lake Tana in Ethiopia. Consequently, these expeditions led to new scientific and geographical discoveries in the White Nile basin:

- Salim Kapudan proved that the White Nile—which is the primary course of the Nile—extends southward toward the equatorial regions and not toward West Africa, which helped correct ancient theories that suggested it connected to the Niger River or originated in the far West of Africa.
- The expeditions disproved that the Nile originated from the Mountains of the Moon, establishing that these mountains did not exist at all, despite being described by Ptolemy as towering peaks covered in perpetual snows. Instead, they demonstrated that the White Nile flows from the African Great Lakes, which were explored subsequently.
- History records Salim Kapudan as the first explorer to accurately determine the mouth of the Sobat River (on 16 December 1839), highlighting its physical characteristics, its sweet water taste, its reddish color, and its flow current, which differs entirely from that of the White Nile.
- Salim Kapudan was the first explorer to navigate the course of the Bahr al-Jabal, discover its physical and geographical properties, and determine its locations astronomically.
- Salim Kapudan and his companions drew illustrative maps of the river's course and its surrounding areas up to latitude 4^{°} north of the Equator, and the expedition's reports logged periodic measurements regarding water depth, channel width, and the speed of the water currents.
- These expeditions were the first official missions to navigate through the dense vegetation barriers that obstructed navigation in South Sudan, historically known as the Sudd.
- They provided descriptions of the various ethnic groups and tribes settled along the banks of the White Nile (such as the Shilluk, Dinka, Nuer, and Bari), documenting their ways of life, social systems, and available economic resources.

The expeditions also established direct channels of communication between the inhabitants of the Equatorial Nile Basin and the northern valley in Sudan and Egypt, resulting in several cultural and social outcomes:

- The spread of and introduction to Islam for the first time in regions of South Sudan and Uganda. The organized presence of the expedition members and their public practice of religious rituals, such as prayer and fasting, introduced local tribes to Islam; historical references indicate that some inhabitants near Gondokoro embraced Islam as a result of this direct interaction.
- The spread of the Arabic language as a lingua franca among local tribes subsequently. These expeditions paved the way for the establishment of trading posts and administrative centers in later periods, which facilitated the emergence of Arabic as a common tool of communication among the multilingual ethnic groups in those regions.
- The peaceful relations and early commercial exchanges established by the expedition with some local chiefs helped facilitate the movement of traders and preachers from northern Sudan and Egypt into the heart of Equatorial Africa over the following decades.
- Opening the navigation route resulted in the arrival of scientific missions and expeditions, which contributed to ending the complete isolation of South Sudan from the civilized world and introduced elements of modern civilization to it.

Salim Pasha's expeditions subsequently contributed to Egyptian politics and military strategy, as:

- Prior to Salim Kapudan's voyages, the Egyptian administration possessed no actual influence beyond the south of the town of "Al-Ais" (latitude 13° 42' N); however, the geopolitical results of his expeditions politically paved the way for the later Egyptian administration to navigate these regions, planning their formal annexation and extending Egyptian sovereignty.
- Reorganizing the military administration in Turco-Egyptian Sudan: based on the geographical gains of the expeditions, the Egyptian government subsequently restructured and developed the general staff of the Egyptian Armed Forces, training Egyptian officers to militarily and topographically pioneer and explore the southern provinces.
- Salim Kapudan's expeditions helped map the area geographically, which later assisted rulers in combating the slave trade more easily, establishing military posts and checkpoints along the Sobat River and the White Nile to suppress the slave trade and pursue slave traders.

These voyages inspired many European explorers, such as John Petherick, who was commissioned by the Egyptian government and undertook several expeditions in the Bahr el Ghazal basin between 1853 and 1858, and again between 1862 and 1863.

== Works ==
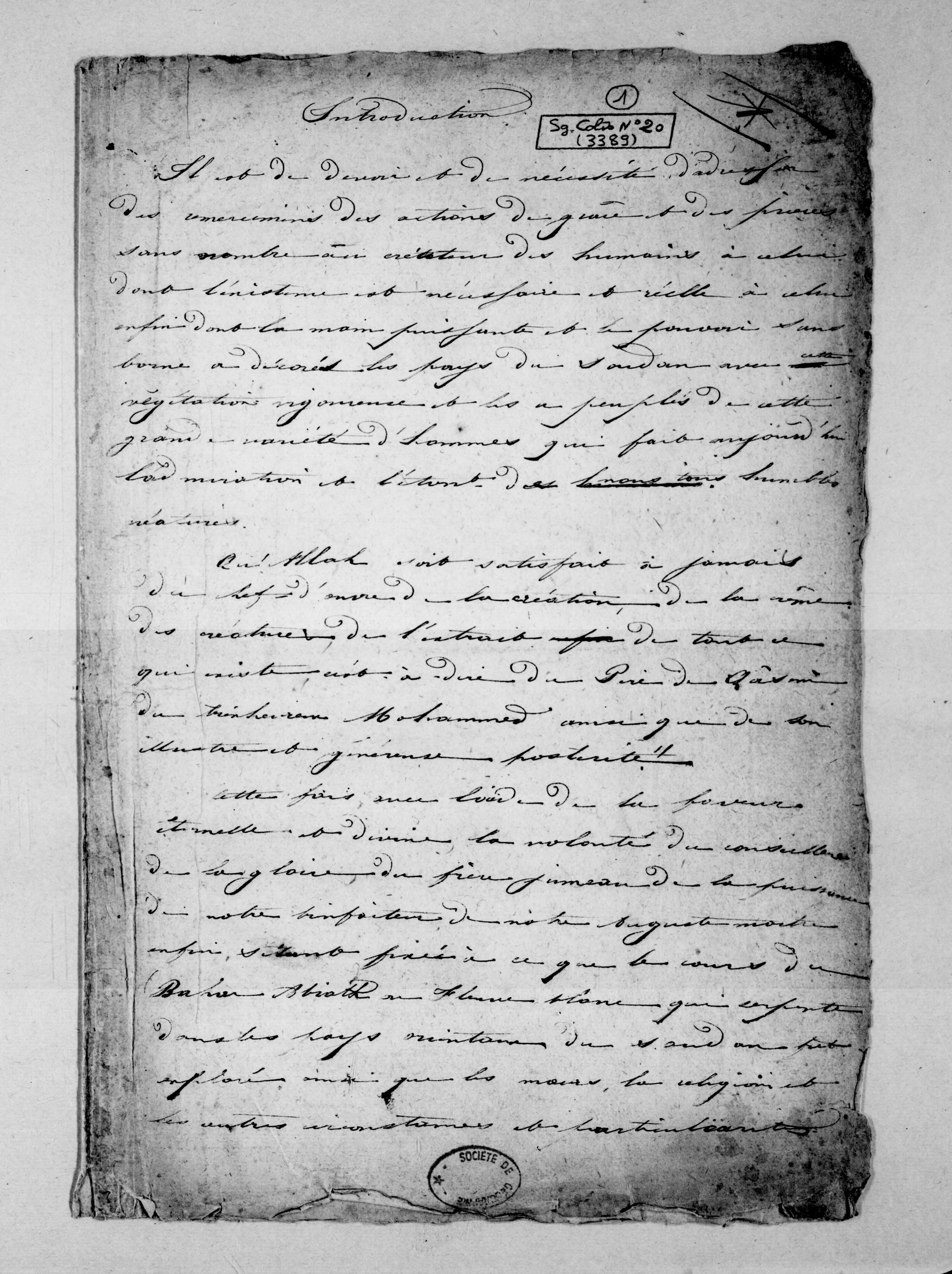
The first page of Salim Pasha's original manuscript about his first voyage, published by the French Geographical Society.

Muhammad Salim Kapudan authored his book, The First Journey to Search for the Sources of the White Nile, in which he chronicled the first of his three famous expeditions. The French Geographical Society in Paris published this book in French in its July 1842 issue. It was introduced at the time by Edme-François Jomard, the president of the society, who described this first expedition as:

the earliest fruits of the civilization that was reawakened in Egypt.

The book was not translated into the Arabic language until 1922, when Muhammad Masoud translated it into Arabic. It has been published in Cairo by Madbouly Library in several editions. Another edition was issued in Beirut by the Arab Institute for Research and Publishing, edited by the Syrian poet Nouri al-Jarrah. It was also published digitally for free by the Hindawi Foundation on its website.

His voyages were mentioned in research papers, books, scientific journals, and novels by many European scientists and writers, such as the French novelist Jules Verne in his novel Five Weeks in a Balloon (Chapter 19).

== See also ==
- Joseph Pons d'Arnaud
- Edme-François Jomard
- John Petherick
- Samuel Baker

== Sources ==
- سليم قبودان، الرحلة الأولى للبحث عن ينابيع البحر الأبيض، مكتبة مدبولي، القاهرة، 1996.
- نسيم مقار، البكباشي المصري سليم قبطان والكشف عن منابع النيل، مطبعة لجنة البيان العربي، القاهرة، الطبعة الأولى 1960.
- Werne, Ferdinand. Expedition to Discover the Sources of the White Nile, in the Years 1840, 1841. Translated by Charles William O'Reilly. London: Richard Bentley, 1849.
- فريدريك بنولا، مصر والجغرافيا: خلاصة تاريخية عن الأعمال الجغرافية التي أنجزتها العائلة المحمدية العلوية بالديار المصرية، ترجمة: أحمد زكي، المطبعة الأميرية ببولاق، الجيزة، 1892،
