= Samuel Baker =

British explorer, officer and naturalist (1821–1893)

Sir Samuel Baker KCB FRS FRGS
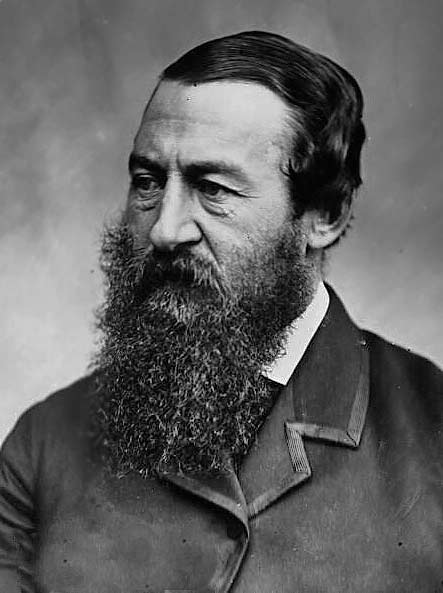
- Born: Samuel White Baker; 8 June 1821; London, England
- Died: 30 December 1893 (aged 72); Newton Abbot, Devon, England
- Resting place: Grimley Saint Bartholomew Church, Grimley, Worcestershire
- Occupations: Explorer, officer, big game hunter, author, engineer
- Spouse: Henrietta Ann Bidgood Martin (m.1843–1855, her death) Lady Florence Baker (m.1865–1893, his death)
- Awards: Fellow of the Royal Society, Patron's Medal and Fellow of the Royal Geographical Society, Grande Medaille d'Or de la Société de Géographie de Paris. Governor-General of Equatoria (1869–1873). President of the Devonshire Association
- Military career
- Allegiance: (United Kingdom) British Empire; Ottoman Empire
- Branch: Egyptian Army
- Rank: Pasha
- Nickname: The White Pasha
- Conflicts: Ottoman-Egyptian Campaign in Sudan

Sir Samuel White Baker (8 June 1821 – 30 December 1893) was an English explorer, officer, naturalist, big game hunter, engineer, writer and abolitionist. He also held the titles of Pasha and Major-General in the Ottoman Empire and Egypt. He served as the Governor-General of the Equatorial Nile Basin (today's South Sudan and Northern Uganda) between April 1869 and August 1873, which he established as the Province of Equatoria.

He is mostly remembered as the first European to visit Lake Albert, as an explorer of the Nile and interior of central Africa, and for his exploits as a big game hunter in Asia, Africa, Europe and North America. Baker wrote a considerable number of books and published articles. He was a friend of King Edward VII, who as Prince of Wales, visited Baker with Queen Alexandra in Egypt. Other friendships were with explorers Henry Morton Stanley, Roderick Murchison, John H. Speke and James A. Grant, with the ruler of Egypt Pasha Ismail The Magnificent, Major-General Charles George Gordon and Maharaja Duleep Singh.

== Family and early biography ==
Samuel White Baker was born on 8 June 1821 in London, as the offspring of a wealthy commercial family. His father, Samuel Baker Sr., was a sugar merchant, banker and ship owner from Thorngrove, Worcestershire with mercantile ties in the West Indies. His younger brother, Col. Valentine Baker, known as "Baker Pasha", was initially a British hero of the African Cape Colony, the Crimean War, Ceylon and the Balkans, later dishonoured by a civilian scandal. Valentine had successfully sought fame in the Ottoman Empire, notably the Russian-Turkish War in the Caucasus and the War of Sudan from Egypt. Samuel's other siblings were: James, John, Mary "Min" (later Cawston), Ellen (later Hopkinson) and Anna Eliza Baker (later Bourne).

Baker was educated at a private school at Rottingdean in Sussex, next at the King's School, Gloucester (1833–1835), then privately at Tottenham (1838–1840), before completing his studies in Frankfurt, Germany in 1841. He studied and graduated MA as Civil Engineer. While commissioned, at Constanța, Romania, as Royal Superintendent, he designed and planned railways, bridges and other structures across the Dobruja region, from the Danube to the Black Sea.

On 3 August 1843, he married his first wife, Henrietta Ann Bidgood Martin, daughter of the Rev Charles Herbert Martin, Rector of St Giles, Maisemore, Gloucestershire. Together, they had seven children: Agnes, Charles Martin, Constance, Edith, Ethel, Jane & John Lindsay Sloan. His brother John Garland Baker married Henrietta's sister Eliza Heberden Martin and after a double wedding, the four moved to Mauritius, overseeing the family's plantation. After spending two years there the desire for travel took them in 1846 to Ceylon, where in the following year he founded an agricultural settlement at Nuwara Eliya, a mountain health-resort.

Aided by his family, he brought emigrants from England, together with choice breeds of cattle, and before long the new settlement was a success. During his residence in Ceylon he wrote and published The Rifle and the Hound in Ceylon (1853) and two years later Eight Years' Wanderings in Ceylon (1855). These books showcase his hunting of wildlife in Ceylon (Sri Lanka). After twelve years of marriage, his wife, Henrietta, died of typhoid fever in 1855, leaving Samuel a widower at the age of thirty-four. His two sons and one daughter (Jane) also died young. Baker left his four surviving daughters in the care of his unmarried sister Mary "Min".

After a journey to Constantinople and the Crimea in 1856, he went to Constanța, Romania and acted as Royal Superintendent for the construction of a railway and bridges across the Dobruja, connecting the Danube with the Black Sea. After that project was completed he spent some months on a tour of south-eastern Europe and Asia Minor.

== Florence Baker and travels in Eastern Europe ==
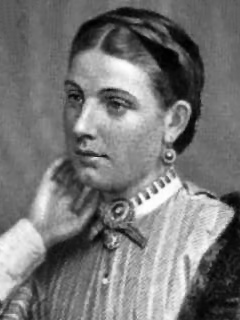
Lady Florence Baker (1841–1916).

While Baker was visiting the Duke of Atholl on his shooting estate in Scotland, he befriended Maharaja Duleep Singh and in 1858–1859 the two partnered an extensive hunting trip in central Europe and the Balkans, via Frankfurt, Berlin, Vienna and Budapest. On the last part of the voyage, Baker and the Maharajah hired a wooden boat in Budapest, which was eventually abandoned on the frozen Danube. The two continued into Vidin where, to amuse the Maharajah, Baker went to the Vidin slave market. There, Baker fell in love with a white slave girl destined for the Ottoman Pasha of Vidin. He was outbid by the Pasha but bribed the girl's attendants and they ran away in a carriage together and eventually she became his lover and wife and accompanied him everywhere he journeyed. They are reported to have married, most probably in Bucharest, before going to Dubrushka, but Sir Samuel certainly promised that they would go through another ceremony on their return to England – where they had a family wedding in 1865.

She was officially born 6 August 1841 (but more probably 1845) in Nagyenyed, Austria-Hungary (today Aiud, Romania) and was named Florenz Barbara Maria. She said that her nurse helped her to a refugee camp in Vidin, Bulgaria. Possibly it was there that she was adopted by an Armenian family with name Finnian (or Finnin). Her nurse married and left her, probably during the first Amnesty of 1857. Later she was abducted and sold to an Armenian slave merchant, who groomed her for the Harem.

Baker and the girl fled to Bucharest and remained in Romania, Baker applying for the position of British Consul there but being refused. In Constanța, he acted as the Royal Superintendent for the construction of a railway and bridges across the Dobruja, connecting the Danube with the Black Sea. After its completion he spent some months on a tour in south-eastern Europe and Asia Minor. The new consul issued Baker's companion with a British passport under the name Florence Barbara Maria Finnian, although she was British neither by birth nor yet by marriage. She was affectionately called "Flooey" by Baker and later nicknamed Anyadwe or Daughter of the Moon in what is now northern Uganda by the Luo-speaking Acholi natives, who prized her long blonde hair.

Florence refused to stay home, instead following her husband in his travels. She spoke English, Turkish, and Arabic, rode camels, mules and horses and carried pistols when in the wilds. Although Sir Samuel and Lady Baker were personally charming enough to conquer most of Victorian society, Queen Victoria refused to receive Florence at court since she believed Baker had been "intimate with his wife before marriage", as indeed he had. Confusingly, Lady Baker is in Hungarian sources known as Sass (or Szász) Flóra, and Florica Maria Sas in the Romanian sources. She died in 1916 at the estate she had shared with her husband in Sandford Orleigh, Devon. She was 74 years old and was buried with her husband, who had died 23 years earlier, in the Baker family vault at Grimley, near Worcester, although her name was never recorded.

== Career ==
In March 1861 he started upon his first tour of exploration in central Africa. This, in his own words, was undertaken "to discover the sources of the river Nile, with the hope of meeting the East African expedition under Captains Speke and Grant somewhere about the Lake Victoria." After a year spent on the Sudan–Ethiopian frontier, during which time he learned Arabic, explored the Atbara river and other Nile tributaries, and proved that the Nile sediment came from Ethiopia, he arrived at Khartoum, leaving that city in December 1862 to follow up the course of the White Nile.

Two months later at Gondokoro he met Speke and Grant, who, after being led by the local Africans to the source of the Nile, were following the river to Egypt. Their success made him fear that there was nothing left for his own expedition to accomplish; but the two explorers gave him information which enabled him, after separating from them, to achieve the first European visit to Albert Nyanza (Lake Albert), of whose existence credible assurance had already been given to Speke and Grant. Baker first sighted the lake on 14 March 1864. After some time spent in the exploration of the neighbourhood, Baker demonstrated that the Nile flowed through the Albert Nyanza. He formed an exaggerated idea of the relative importance of the Albert and Victoria lake sources in contributing to the Nile flow rate. Although he believed them to be near equal, Albert Nyanza sources add only ~15% to the Nile flow at this point, the remainder provided primarily by outflow from Lake Victoria. While in this area, Baker and his wife became the first Europeans to see a substantial waterfall on the Victoria Nile, which Baker named Murchison Falls after the then-president of the Royal Geographical Society, Sir Roderick Murchison. He started upon his return journey, and reached Khartoum, after many checks, in May 1865.

In the following October Baker returned to England with his wife, who had accompanied him throughout the dangerous and difficult journeys in Africa. In recognition of the achievements, the Royal Geographical Society awarded him its Patron's Medal, and a similar distinction was bestowed on him by the Paris Geographical Society. In August 1866 he was knighted. In the same year he published The Albert N'yanza, Great Basin of the Nile, and Explorations of the Nile Sources, and in 1867 The Nile Tributaries of Abyssinia, both books quickly turned into several editions. In 1868 he published a popular story called Cast up by the Sea. In 1869 he travelled with the future King Edward VII (who was the Prince of Wales at that time) through Egypt.

Baker never received quite the same level of acclamation granted to other contemporary British explorers of Africa. Queen Victoria, in particular, avoided meeting Baker because of the irregular way in which he acquired Florence, not to mention the fact that during the years of their mutual travels, the couple were not actually married. A court case involving his brother Valentine Baker (following his indecent assault of a woman on a train) also harmed Baker's chances of wider acceptance by the Victorian establishment.

In 1869, at the request of the khedive Ismail, Baker led a military expedition to the equatorial regions of the Nile, with the object of suppressing the slave-trade there and opening the way to commerce and civilisation. Before starting from Cairo with a force of 1700 Egyptian troops – many of them discharged convicts – he was given the rank of pasha and major-general in the Ottoman army. Lady Baker, as before, accompanied him. The khedive appointed him Governor-General of the new territory of Equatoria for four years at a salary of £10,000 a year; and it was not until the expiration of that time that Baker returned to Cairo, leaving his work to be carried on by the new governor, Colonel Charles George Gordon.

He had to contend with innumerable difficulties – the blocking of the river in the Sudd, the hostility of officials interested in the slave-trade, the armed opposition of the natives – but he succeeded in planting in the new territory the foundations upon which others could build up an administration.

== Later life ==
He published his narrative of the central African expedition under the title of Ismailia (1874). Cyprus as I saw it in 1879 was the result of a visit to that island. He spent several winters in Egypt, and travelled in India, the Rocky Mountains and Japan in search of big game, publishing in 1890 Wild Beasts and their Ways.

He kept up a correspondence with men of all shades of opinion upon Egyptian affairs, strongly opposing the abandonment of the Sudan by the British Empire and subsequently urging its reconquest. Next to these, questions of maritime defence and strategy chiefly attracted him in his later years.

In November 1874 he purchased the Sandford Orleigh estate in Newton Abbot, Devon, England, where he also died after a heart attack, at the age of 72, on 30 December 1893. He was cremated and his ashes buried in the Baker family vault at Grimley Saint Bartholomew Churchyard in Grimley, Worcestershire.

== Hunting authority ==
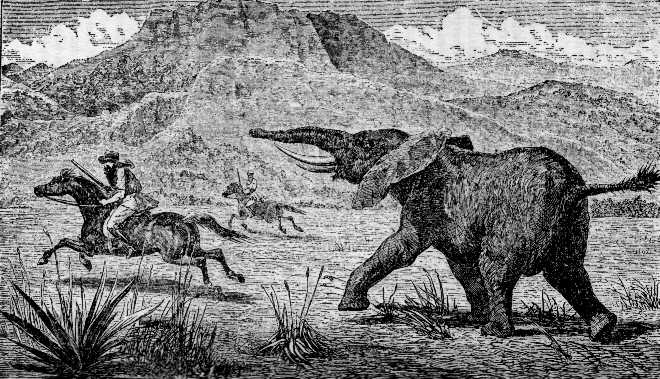
Explorer and big game hunter Samuel Baker chased by an elephant.

Baker was proud of his British heritage and was an advocate of the virtues of his nation, and a fighter against slavery in Northern Uganda at Fort Patiko.

Sir Samuel Baker in hunting attire with trophies of rhino and buffalo.

An acclaimed sportsman, he likely started hunting in the Scottish Highlands; his skills were renowned, and he once gave a demonstration to friends in Scotland of how he could, with dogs, successfully hunt down a stag armed only with a knife, he did the same with the large boars in the jungles of Ceylon. He hunted consistently until his last years, in Europe, Asia, Africa and North America.

Baker forged his skills chasing Asian elephants and sambar deer in Ceylon, a place where Rowland Ward's records account him for some of the world's largest wild boar trophies. He travelled looking for sport in Asia Minor in 1860, in Scotland in 1869 for red stag, in the Rocky Mountains in 1881 downing elk, grizzly and buffalo. In 1886, he was in the French Alps, looking for brown bear and many times in India in 1885 and 1887–1889 pursuing tigers and blackbuck.

His most memorable hunting-related exploits remained the episodes in Africa and Ceylon, where he returned again towards the end of his life in 1887. He also visited for sport, Transylvania for bears, Serbia for wild boars, Hungary for deer, Cyprus in 1879, China and Japan.

Baker left a wealth of study in the science of hunting firearms and ballistics, and accounts as one of the world's few hunters that used the two bore rifle, the world's largest gun calibre for the purpose. He described in great detail his observations of the animal world, account in which, his book Wild Beasts And Their Ways (1890) ranks highest.

In 1863, the German zoologist Theodor von Heuglin named a subspecies of Roan antelope in his honour: Hippotragus e. bakeri or Baker's antelope. In Sri Lanka, Baker's Falls bears his name, and in 1906 Luigi Amedeo, Duke of the Abruzzi, named Mount Baker in his honour while in the Rwenzori Mountains of Uganda.

== Bibliography ==
Complete works of Sir Samuel White Baker

- The Rifle And Hound In Ceylon (1853)
- Eight Years' Wanderings In Ceylon. (1855)
- The Albert N'Yanza Great Basin Of The Nile; And Exploration Of The Nile Sources. (1866)
- The Nile Tributaries Of Abyssinia; And The Sword Of Hamran Arabs. (1867)
- Cast Up By The Sea Or The Adventures Of Ned Grey, A Book For Boys. (1869)
- Ismailia – A Narrative Of The Expedition To Central Africa For The Suppression Of Slave Trade, Organised By Ismail, Khadive Of Egypt. (1874)
- Cyprus As I Saw It In 1879 (1879)
- In The Heart Of Africa. (1886)
- Wild Beasts And Their Ways, Reminescenses Of Europe, Asia, Africa And America. (1890)
- True Tales For My Grandsons. (1891)

Books about Sir Samuel White Baker

- Charton, Edouard (1867). Le tour du monde – nouveau journal des voyages – livraison n°366,367 et 368 – Voyage à l'Albert N'Yanza ou lac Albert (le louta n'zigé du capitaine Speke) Sir Samuel White Baker (1861–1864). Paris: Hachette.
- Murray, T. Douglas; White, Arthur S. (1895). Sir Samuel White Baker: A Memoir. London: MacMillan & Co.
- Middleton, Dorothy (1949). Baker Of The Nile. London: Falcon Press.
- Hall, Richard (1980). Lovers on the Nile. London: Collins.
- Brander, Michael (1982). The Perfect Victorian Hero: The Life And Times of Sir Samuel White Baker. London and Edinburgh: Mainstream Pub. Co.
- Shipman, Pat (2004). To The Heart Of The Nile: Lady Florence Baker and the Exploration of Central Africa. New York: Harper Collins.
  - (UK edition) Shipman, Pat (2004). The Stolen Woman: Florence Baker's Extraordinary Life From Harem to the Heart of Africa. Bantam Press. p. 428.
- Thormanby, T. R. (2007). Four Fathers of Big Game Hunting – Biographical Sketches Of The Sporting Lives Of William Cotton Oswell, Henry Astbury Leveson, Samuel White Baker & Roualeyn George Gordon Cumming. Read Country Book.
- Alpsten, E. (2008). Die Quellen der Sehnsucht.

Articles about Sir Samuel White Baker

- Wisnicki, Adrian (2010). "Rewriting Agency: Baker, Bunyoro-Kitara, and the Egyptian Slave Trade". Studies in Travel Writing. 14 (1): 52–56. doi:10.1080/13645140903464970. S2CID 154571251.
- Amone, Charles (2013). "The double Face of Sir Samuel Baker`s Anti-Slave Trade Campaigns in the Upper Nile Valley, 1869 to 1874". Greener Journal of Art and Humanities. 3 (3): 1–27. doi:10.15580/GJAH.2013.3.082613800.

== See also ==
- List of famous big game hunters
- Selim Qapudan
- John Petherick

== Sources ==
- Chisholm, Hugh, ed. (1911). "Baker, Sir Samuel White" . Encyclopædia Britannica (11th ed.). Cambridge University Press. This work in turn cites:
  - T. Douglas Murray and A. Silva White Sir Samuel Baker, a Memoir (London, 1895).
- McLoone, Margo, Women explorers in Africa: Christina Dodwell, Delia Akeley, Mary Kingsley, Florence von Sass Baker, and Alexandrine Tinne (Capstone Press, 1997)
