= Christina Dodwell =

British explorer, travel writer, and lecturer

Christina Dodwell FRGS (born 1 February 1951) is a British explorer, travel writer, and lecturer. She is Chairman of the Dodwell Trust and was awarded the Mungo Park Medal in 1989.

Dodwell has travelled in West Africa, the former Rhodesia, Papua New Guinea, Turkey, China, Afghanistan, Madagascar, Siberia, and Kurdistan, by horse, canoe, elephant, camel and microlight, and has published books and articles about many of

She also travelled with David Roberts David Roberts.

== Life ==
Dodwell was born in 1951 in Nigeria to British parents, Christopher Bradford Dodwell DFC, late the Glider Pilot Regiment, and Evelyn Dodwell (née Beddow). Her parents had married in England on 11 May 1946, and her father became the District Officer in Oyo, Nigeria, where he was also a writer on Nigerian topics. Her mother and grandmother had both grown up in China, and Dodwell said in 1996 "I don't know where I belong. My family thought it was totally normal that I had a larger view of the world."

When she was six, Dodwell's family returned to live in London, England. She was educated at Southover Manor School, Lewes, and Beechlawn College, Oxford.

Her first job was as an interior designer. In 1975, she went on holiday to Africa with a girlfriend and two men. The men stole their jeep, leaving the women stranded until they found two wild horses to ride. Her friend returned home, but Dodwell stayed in Africa for three years, travelling by horse, elephant and camel. During this time she spent seven weeks going down the Congo River in a dug-out canoe. After travelling twenty thousand miles around Africa, between 1975 and 1978, Dodwell returned to England and wrote a book about her African experiences, Travels with Fortune. However, she found home life boring and went on to other explorations. Her second major expedition was to Papua New Guinea, travelling by horse and canoe, in 1980 to 1981, and her later travels have included Turkey, China, Madagascar and Siberia, and a seven thousand mile flight by microlight across West Africa. She was arrested in Gonbad and Kurdistan.

In Kraimbit, New Guinea, Dodwell was initiated into manhood by the crocodile people of the New Guinea lowlands. Her shoulder was scarred with a scaly pattern imitating one found on a crocodile's forehead. In Kenya, she was paralysed for ten days by the bite of a hunting spider.

Her travels in China and Tibet took her to Kashgar, Karakol on Lake Issyk Kul, Xinjiang, the lamasery of Taer'si, Chengdu and Shilin. She may have been the first Westerner to see the dragon boat race on Lake Er Hai.

There is little that she refuses to eat. Looking beyond elephant's trunk, crocodile's tail, and hump of rhinoceros, she said in an interview "When one's eaten maggots three or four times one isn't squeamish, and if someone brings you a bowlful that they've spent the day gathering it would be impolite to go 'urgh!'... I seem able to eat anything without ill effects, although I had one bad day after eating a piece of rotten camel."

Dennis Hackett, writing a television review in The Times in October 1984, said –

To call Christina Dodwell intrepid would surely sell her short: intrepidity can only be the outward sign of the inward compulsion that makes her walk among savage-looking peoples in the wilder parts of the earth with the aplomb of a woman who has just entered her giant marrow at the local garden show and knows she cannot be beaten. Though there was much to command attention in BBC2's River Journeys series last night she was undoubtedly the star, with soft voice and swinging walk, under a hat that might have been bequeathed her by John Wayne, tall, confident, all-conquering.

Altogether, by 1997 she had visited some eighty countries. Together with Delia Akeley, Mary Kingsley, Florence Baker, and Alexine Tinne, she was one of the five subjects of a book by Margo McLoone published that year, Women explorers in Africa (1997).

In 1990, she was appointed as an Attaché at the London Consulate of the Republic of Madagascar, continuing with this until 2005. In 1995 she established a charity called the Dodwell Trust, to help Madagascar's people, chiefly in the areas of education, family health, and sustainable development.

Dodwell's nine books have been translated into five other languages. She has also made three television films and more than forty radio documentaries for BBC Radio 4, has lectured at the Royal Geographical Society, London, the Royal Scottish Geographical Society, Edinburgh, the Smithsonian Institution, Washington, D.C., and the Explorers Club of New York City. Her three television films for the BBC are River Journey – Waghi (1984, BAFTA award), Black Pearls of Polynesia (1991) and African Footsteps – Madagascar (1996).

She married Stephen Hobbs in 1991. In 1994, she was reported to own a flat in London and a small farm in Oxfordshire, but said that her ideal home was a timber house without electricity in the Valley of Geysers, Kamchatka, belonging to a bear-tracker she had met there in 1992. In 2009, she made a documentary for BBC Radio 4 on indigenous culture in Ethiopia. After her husband's death, she explored living with her widowed sister in Gloucestershire, appearing in an episode of the BBC's "Escape to the Country." She now lives on a farm, but still spends much of her time in Africa.

== Major publications ==
- Travels with Fortune – an African Adventure (1979)
- Travels in Papua New Guinea (1982)
- An Explorer's Handbook: An Unconventional Guide for Travellers to Remote Regions – Travel, Survival, and Bush Cookery (1984)
- River Journeys (with Russell Braddon, Germaine Greer, William Shawcross, Brian Thompson, and Michael Wood) (London: BBC Books, 1984)
- A Traveller in China (London: Hodder & Stoughton, 1985)
- A Traveller on Horseback in Eastern Turkey and Iran (1987)
- Travels with Pegasus: a Microlight Journey Across West Africa (1989)
- Beyond Siberia (London: Hodder & Stoughton, 1993)
- Madagascar Travels (1995)

== Other publications ==
- Preface to Richard Barnes, Eye on the Hill – Horse Travels in Britain (1987)

== Honours ==
- Fellow of the Royal Geographical Society, 1982
- British Academy of Film and Television Arts Award for film River Journey – Waghi, 1985
- Mungo Park Medal of the Royal Scottish Geographical Society, 1989
