= John Petherick =

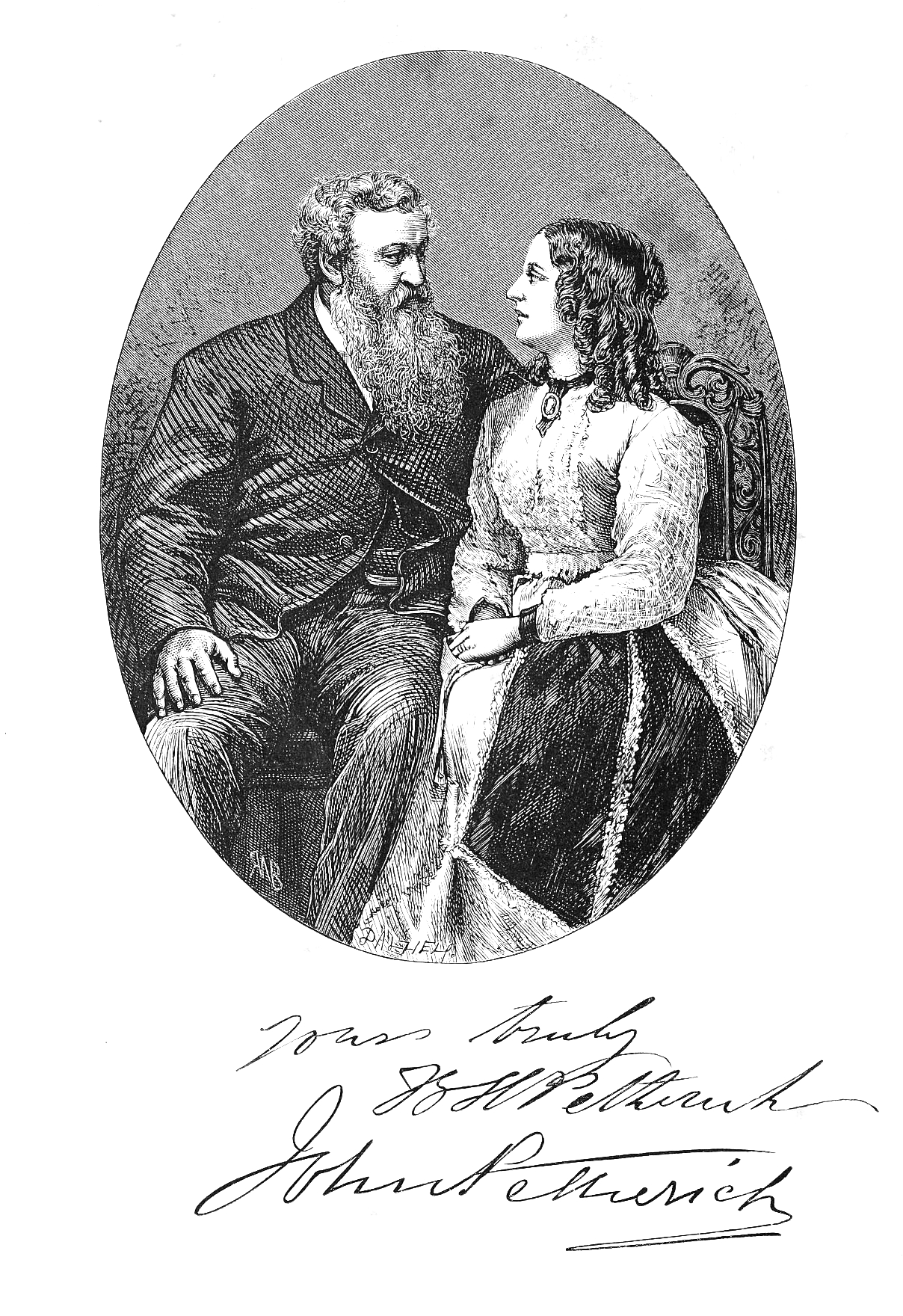
John Petherick and his wife Katherine.

John Petherick (1813 – 15 July 1882), was a Welsh traveller, trader and British consul in the Sudan (1861-1864). He traded in ivory and gum arabic, collected natural history specimens and explored the region.

== Life ==
Petherick was born in Merthyr Tydfil, Glamorganshire, and was christened on 13 June 1813, at St Tydfil’s parish church. His father was caught up during the Merthyr Rising of 1831 and in 1833 the family sold their home and moved to work as a manager in Pyle ironworks. John was studying in Breslau as a mining engineer and initially worked in a German mining company in the Harz Mountains. While living in Dillenburg he met Sir Roderick Murchison and Adam Sedgwick who were studying the local geology. He quit the job for health reasons and travelled through Switzerland, France and Wales where he went to the spa at Llandrindod Wells. Here he heard from Gallaway, a Cardiff engineer, about a job that needed someone to seek coal for the viceroy of Egypt and the Sudan.

In 1845 he entered the service of Mehemet Ali, and was employed in examining Upper Egypt, Nubia, the Red Sea coast and Kordofan in an unsuccessful search for coal. Petherick made an expedition into the Sinai Peninsula in search of coal. He failed to find anything substantial but a Frenchman who had also been hired found some coal. Petherick continued to make trips to various regions until 1849. He then went to El Obeid where he had heard from the British Consul, Charles Murray, that there was an opportunity for trade in gum arabic. the Egyptian service and established himself at El Obeid, the capital of Kordofan, as a trader, dealing largely in gum arabic. In 1853 he moved to Khartoum and became an ivory trader when the gum trade became less profitable due to cheaper sources in West Africa. He made five expeditions for ivory from 1853 to 1858. He travelled extensively in the Bahr-el-Ghazal region, then almost unknown, exploring the Jur River, Yalo and other affluents of the Bahr el Ghazal river. In 1858 he penetrated to the Niam-Niam country. His additions to the knowledge of natural history were considerable.

Petherick returned to England in 1859 where he made the acquaintance of J.H. Speke, then arranging for his expedition to discover the source of the Nile. While in England Petherick married, and published an account of his travels.

He returned to the Sudan in 1861, accompanied by his wife Katherine Harriet Edlman and with the rank of consul. He was entrusted with a mission by the Royal Geographical Society to convey to Gondokoro relief stores for captains Speke and Grant. Petherick got boats to Gondokoro in 1862, but Speke and Grant had not arrived. Having arranged for a native force to proceed south to get in touch with the absentees, a task successfully accomplished, Mr and Mrs Petherick undertook another journey in the Bahr-el-Ghazal, making important collections of plants and fishes. They regained Gondokoro (where one of their boats with stores was already stationed) in February 1863, four days after the arrival of Speke and Grant, who had meantime accepted the hospitality of Mr (afterwards Sir) Samuel Baker. Speke later publicly accused Petherick of failing to fulfill his commitment.

Speke and members of the white community in Khartoum also accused Petherick of involvement in the slave trade. In this the Europeans may perversely have been motivated by Petherick's interference in their commercial activities; slavery was deeply entwined with the local economy. Petherick's own business involved collaboration with slavers; he also made some efforts to disrupt slave trading. Despite or because of the complex reality Earl Russell, then secretary for foreign affairs, abolished the British consulate at Khartoum in 1864. Petherick's reputation and finances were badly damaged.

In 1865 the Pethericks returned to England, and in 1869 published Travels in Central Africa and Explorations of the Western Nile Tributaries, in which he set out the details of the Speke controversy.

Petherick died in London on 15 July 1882.

== See also ==
- Selim Qapudan
- Samuel Baker

== Cited Sources ==
- Humphries, John (15 September 2013). Search for the Nile's Source: The Ruined Reputation of John Petherick, Nineteenth-Century Welsh Explorer. University of Wales Press. ISBN 978-0-7083-2678-7.

== Sources ==
- Media related to John Petherick at Wikimedia Commons
