= Hermione Knox, Countess of Ranfurly =

British noble (1913–2001)

The Right Honourable The Countess of Ranfurly OBE
- Born: Hermione Llewellyn; 13 November 1913; Postlip, Gloucestershire, England
- Died: 11 February 2001 (aged 87); Buckinghamshire, England

Hermione Knox, Countess of Ranfurly, OBE (née Llewellyn; 13 November 1913 – 11 February 2001) was a British author and aristocrat who is best known for her war memoir To War With Whitaker: The Wartime Diaries of the Countess of Ranfurly, 1939–1945.

== Childhood ==
Hermione Llewellyn was born in Postlip, Gloucestershire, into a wealthy family of Welsh origin. She had an older brother, Griffith Owen (1912–1933), and two sisters, Cynthia (born 1916) and Daphne (born 1922); "I started life as a disappointment – because I wasn't a boy", she recalled. "I continued being a disappointment – because I was ugly. Instead of minding, I determined to ride better, run faster, be funnier and give more generous presents than the rest of the family." Their father, Griffith Robert Poyntz Llewellyn, was dashing, popular and extravagant; his lack of caution was to have disastrous consequences, and he lost the family fortune on horses and houses when Hermione was thirteen. "We became poor very quickly", she reported. Their mother, Emily Constance (née Elwes), became mentally ill during Hermione's childhood and was diagnosed with manic-depression. The family accompanied her to Switzerland for treatment. There was further family tragedy with Owen's death in an air crash.

She completed her education at Southover Manor School, in Sussex.

== Career ==
In 1930 and impoverished, a 17-year-old Hermione moved to London to look for a job. As she noted, she was "ill-prepared for life beyond the bounds of a country estate", and had no qualifications except "good English and good manners." It was the height of the Great Depression, and there were few available openings, but she managed to obtain a job selling gas appliances for the Gas Light and Coke Company. She had scarcely ever been in a kitchen, and had difficulty giving personal advice to customers. Nevertheless, she became a successful saleswoman and wrote that "people seemed to like it when I said: 'Always buy a gas cooker with a large oven, then you can commit suicide with your husband'".

Hermione took a secretarial course and subsequently found employment in a War Office typing pool. She remained short of money, and though invited to balls and for weekends at country houses, she had to decline, as she could not afford to buy the necessary clothes. In 1937, Hermione went to Australia as secretary to Lord Wakehurst who had been appointed as Governor of New South Wales. On a visit to Canberra, she met Daniel Knox, 6th Earl of Ranfurly, who was aide-de-camp to the Australian Governor-General. The day she returned to England, she found Ranfurly seated on the sofa in her London flat, reading the Sporting Life; the two immediately became engaged, and were married on 17 January 1939.

== Second World War ==
The Ranfurlys were on a stalking holiday in Scotland when the news came that Nazi Germany had invaded Poland. Cutting short their trip, they returned to London, where a telegram awaited them from Dan's Yeomanry regiment, the Sherwood Rangers, telling him to report to duty in Nottinghamshire. Dan turned to their portly cook-butler, Whitaker, and asked if he was coming too. Hermione recorded that "Whitaker sat there looking fat and rather red, and he said, 'To the war my Lord?' and Dan said 'Yes'. And Whitaker said: 'Very good, my Lord,' as though Dan had asked for a cup of coffee." The exchange was to provide the title of Lady Ranfurly's war diaries, To War with Whitaker, which proved to be an unexpected publishing success in the 1990s.

On their first wedding anniversary, Lord Ranfurly left with the Sherwood Rangers for a posting to British-controlled Palestine. Regulations barred wives of the Yeomanry from joining their husbands at the front. However, Hermione ignored the rules, and in February 1940 managed to obtain a passage to Egypt from a shady London travel agent, arriving in Palestine two weeks later.

Hermione thought that with her secretarial skills, she would easily find a job in the Middle East. It proved more difficult than expected, and in September 1940 a one-eyed brigadier ordered her forcible repatriation to Britain with other "illegal wives". Determined not to be separated from her husband, she jumped ship from the RMS Empress of Britain at Cape Town, and succeeded in obtaining an aeroplane ticket back to Egypt by implying to a travel agent that she was a spy on a secret mission. The Empress of Britain was sunk shortly after.

On arrival in Cairo, Lady Ranfurly lay low in the flat of her friends Pamela and Patrick Hore-Ruthven, but gradually her return became known. Her actions infuriated the British military authorities, which made finding a job difficult. However, her secretarial skills were in short supply and she was soon recruited to work for the Special Operations Executive office in Cairo. Despite continued opposition from the Army, who failed in an attempt to have British ambassador Sir Miles Lampson remove her passport, she became the highly efficient secretary to George Pollock, the head of the SOE. At first pleased with her job, she quickly became concerned about the SOE's actions, intentions, and dubious security and finances, and considered that the organisation was working "across, if not against, the war effort". In March 1941, she expressed her concerns to the visiting Foreign Secretary Anthony Eden and in May to General Wavell, the Commander-in-Chief for the Middle East. Wavell could take no direct action since SOE did not come under the War Office, but sharing her concerns, he asked her to pass on any documents that aroused her suspicion. She achieved this by stealing questionable documents from the office each evening, typing a copy of them and then returning the originals to their positions the next morning. Her subterfuge led directly to a major reorganisation of SOE Cairo in the summer of 1941.

In April 1941, Dan Ranfurly was reported missing after the Battle of Tobruk, and Hermione had no knowledge about whether he was living or dead until she received a letter from him five months later. He remained a prisoner of war in Italy for three years, escaping in 1944 following the Italian armistice. In the interim, Lady Ranfurly received special permission to remain in the Middle East from General Wavell, and worked first as a personal assistant to Sir Harold MacMichael, the High Commissioner in Palestine, and later to General Henry Maitland Wilson, the Supreme Allied commander in the Mediterranean. She was renowned for the tenacity of her desire not to return to England, and General Wilson described Hermione as having "outmanoeuvred every general in the Middle East" to achieve her goal.

Between 1941 and 1944, Hermione Ranfurly lived in Cairo, Jerusalem, Baghdad and Algiers, and met many of famous names who passed through the region, including Lady Diana Cooper, Antoine de Saint-Exupéry, Sir Walter Monckton, Gaston Palewski, and Noël Coward. She shared a house in Baghdad with Freya Stark, took General George S. Patton shopping in Cairo, dined with Douglas Fairbanks Jr. in Algiers, and helped fix General Bernard Montgomery's beret, though she did not think much of the "corny Englishman" complaining that he "would drop his macintosh on the floor and then shout at someone to pick it up." She dined with kings: Peter II of Yugoslavia, Farouk of Egypt and the future Paul of Greece. She befriended a number of intelligence and Special Air Service officers, including Orde Wingate, Fitzroy Maclean, David Stirling and Bill Stirling, and was taught to shoot by a mysterious red-faced man called "Abercrombie" so as to be able to do her part against the Germans. By the end of the war, she likely knew more secrets than any other civilian in the area.

Dan Ranfurly was reunited with his wife in Algiers in May 1944, and after a brief trip to England, Hermione resumed her work as secretary to General Wilson in Algiers and Caserta, Italy, while her husband joined Fitzroy Maclean's liaison mission to Yugoslavia. Hermione was well-positioned for more noteworthy encounters: she taught Admiral Henry Kent Hewitt to dance the Boomps-a-Daisy, and received Marshal Josip Broz Tito for tea: "he was short and stocky and dressed to kill" according to the hostess.

In November 1944, Hermione Ranfurly accepted General Wilson's request that she continue as his secretary when he moved to Washington, D.C. to be head of the British Joint Staff Mission. He rescinded his offer at the last moment, leaving Hermione without a job, luggage or reference. With Dan Ranfurly in Rome, she managed to find a job working for Air Marshal John Slessor, first in Naples and later in London, where she celebrated VE Day by emptying five wastepaper baskets of Slessor's "more boring papers" out of the window.

== Post war ==
At the end of the war, Dan Ranfurly obtained a job in insurance at Lloyd's of London, and later farmed in Buckinghamshire, while Hermione attempted to put her wartime letters and diaries in order while seated on the sitting room floor. The writer Peter Fleming, an old friend, arranged for her to get a contract for their publication; however, Hermione got cold feet, and repaid the advance nine days later. A daughter, Lady Caroline, was born in 1948. On 20 October 1953, Lord Ranfurly was appointed Governor of the Bahamas by Winston Churchill. Hermione took a great interest in all aspects of Bahamian life, and was concerned by the lack of books in libraries and schools. She asked friends to send unwanted volumes, a project that was to become the Ranfurly Library Service in Nassau. The couple also founded a children's home.

When the Ranfurlys returned to the United Kingdom in 1957, Lady Ranfurly extended the Ranfurly Library Service project to other developing countries short on English books; the organisation later changed its name to Book Aid International. She was appointed Officer of the Order of the British Empire in the 1970 New Year Honours.

Lord Ranfurly died of cancer in 1988, and the Countess continued to work her diaries in Buckinghamshire. Her old friend and neighbour Lord Carrington read her work, and with his help To War with Whitaker was published in 1994. The diaries were an immediate success, and one reviewer noted that they offered "a madcap, aristocratic window behind the lines of war". Encouraged by its success, she published a memoir of her childhood, The Ugly One, in 1998.

Lady Ranfurly enjoyed her old age, noting "you have so many more memories than when you are young". She died at her home in Buckinghamshire on 11 February 2001 at the age of 87.

== Works ==
- To War With Whitaker: The Wartime Diaries of the Countess of Ranfurly, 1939–1945 (1994)
- The Ugly One: The Childhood Memoirs of Hermione, Countess of Ranfurly, 1913–1939 (1998)
