= George Nicholls (commissioner) =

British Poor Law Commissioner

Sir George Nicholls (31 December 1781 – 24 March 1865) was a British Poor Law Commissioner after the passing of the Poor Law Amendment Act 1834. He had been an Overseer of the Poor under the old system of poor relief.

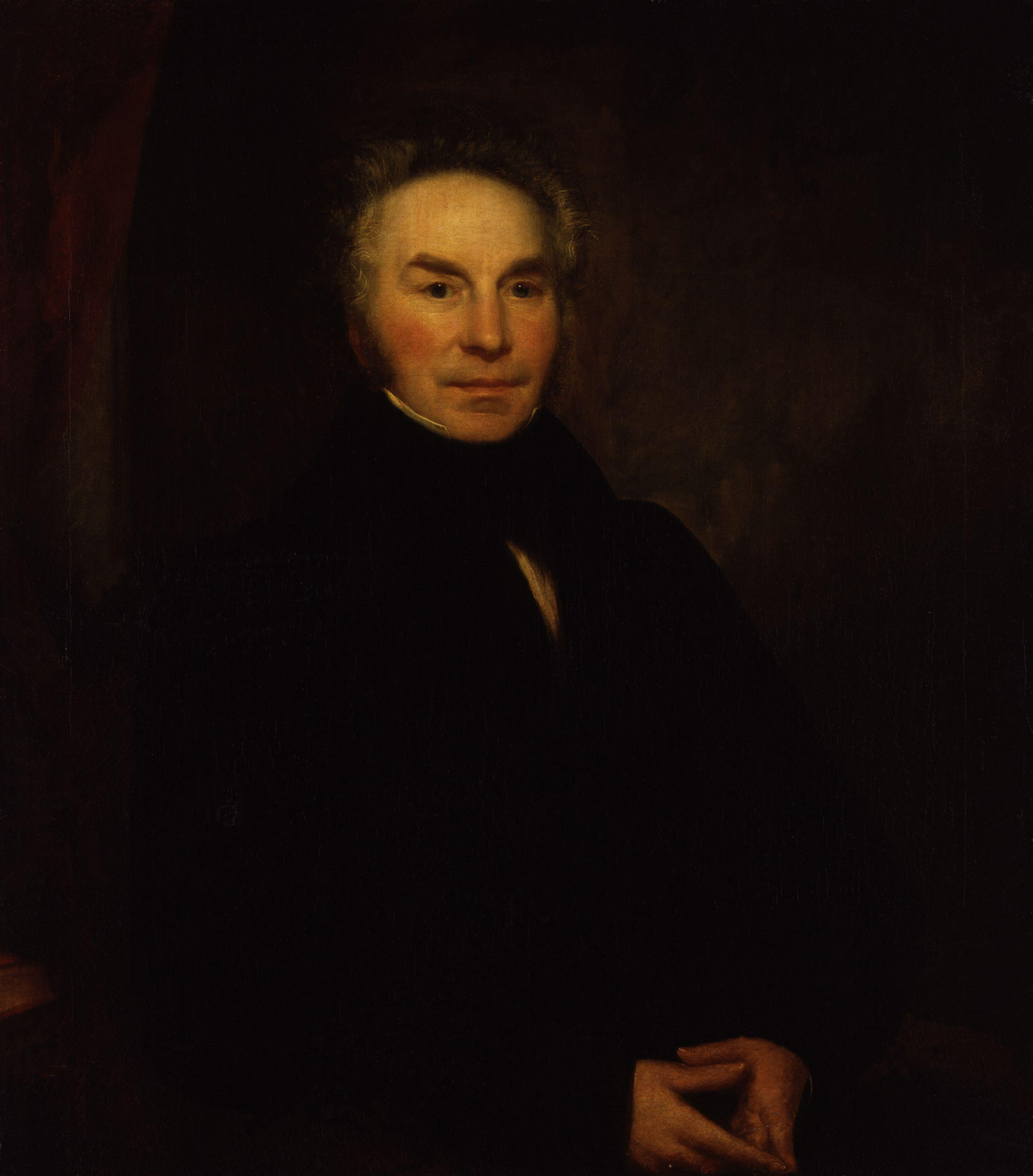
George Nicholls, by Ramsay Richard Reinagle

== Early life ==
He was born on 31 December 1781, at St. Kevern in Cornwall, the eldest child of Solomon Nicholls of St. Kevern, by his second cousin Jane, daughter of George Millett of Helston. He was educated, first at the parish school of St. Kevern Churchtown, under his uncle, William Nicholls; later, at Helston grammar school, under William Otter; and then, for less than a year, at Newton Abbot, Devon, under Mr. Weatherdon.

== Maritime career ==
In the winter of 1796–7 Nicholls's uncle, Captain George Millett, acquired a berth for him as a midshipman on board the East India Company's ship Earl of Abergavenny, commanded by Captain John Wordsworth, uncle of William Wordsworth. After his sixth voyage, having served as fifth, third, and first mate successively, he obtained, in 1809 (when less than twenty-eight years of age), the command of Lady Lushington. On 18 January 1815 the ship then under his command, Bengal, was burnt in the harbour at Point de Galle. The subsequent inquire acquitted him from blame. He was offered the command of another ship, but he left the service the same year, having lost heavily by the disaster.

== Nottinghamshire reformer ==
After living at Highgate for about a year Nicholls went, in April 1816, to Farndon, Nottinghamshire and then moved to Southwell, Nottinghamshire, early in 1819. He took an interest in parochial and public affairs, schools and in agricultural concerns. He found himself in a context where reforming ideas were up in the air; and eventually became a significant rival to John Thomas Becher of Southwell.

At Farndon Nicholls started the first savings bank; and looked into the poor laws and their administration. At Southwell he took an active part as overseer, waywarden, and churchwarden. In 1821 he took on the office of overseer of the poor in Southwell parish; and in two years brought down the cost. The principles adopted had a year or two previously been tried, independently, by Robert Lowe, the rector, in the parish of Bingham, Nottinghamshire, who subsequently became one of Nicholls's close friends; they had been advocated by Nicholls himself in the series of eight "Letters by an Overseer" written by him in 1821 to the Nottingham Journal, and then reprinted as a pamphlet.

Nicholls's main idea was to abolish outdoor relief, and to rely on the 'workhouse test'. At Southwell, too, he instituted a workhouse school, to which children of labourers with large families and applying for relief were admitted and kept during the day, returning to their parents at night.

== Canal company operator ==
Early in 1823, Nicholls was consulted by George Barrow about the Gloucester and Berkeley Canal, at that time incomplete and lacking funds. Nicholls was familiar with the project from 1811; and now there was a chance of support from the Exchequer Bill Loan Commission. He moved to Gloucester, and for three years practically controlled the concern, with powers delegated from Thomas Telford and the other commissioners.

During this period Nicholls engaged in other enterprises, acting mostly with Telford, who became a friend. Among their joint schemes was the plan of the English and Bristol Channels Ship Canal, in favour of which in December 1824 he and Telford reported. The reports were adopted, and an act of parliament obtained. The Panic of 1825, however, hindered the raising of funds; and the advent of railways killed the project.

At this period Nicholls was asked by Alexander Baring to go out and report on the feasibility of a Panama Ship Canal, but declined on account of the climate. In the autumn of 1825 he was called on to report on a scheme for making a harbour at Lowestoft, with a ship canal to Norwich.

== Banker ==
In November 1826 Nicholls accepted the appointment of superintendent of the branch of the bank of England which was then first established at Birmingham. He had previously declined a similar appointment at Gloucester, where the branch had been established, through his exertions, to replace the bank of Turner, Morris, & Turner, which had recently failed, and in the winding-up of the affairs of which he had taken a leading part. He removed to Birmingham in December 1826, and (except for three or four years, during which he lived at the Friary, Handsworth) he resided with his family on the bank premises. His life at Birmingham was a very active one. He found time for many things besides his official duties. He established the Birmingham Savings Bank. He was an active town's commissioner. He was a working member of the committee of the Birmingham General Hospital. He originated and organised a system under which taxes were paid through the Bank of England branch, a system which was afterwards extended to other branches throughout the country. He was a member of the Society of Arts, and was concerned in the provision of the building for the exhibition of pictures and statuary in New Street. He became a director of the Birmingham Canal Navigations, and remained at the board until his death, being chairman during the last twelve years. In 1829 he was consulted by the home secretary, Robert (afterwards Sir Robert) Peel, on the general condition of Birmingham, and the friendly intercourse thus begun was never afterwards broken. During this period he refused an offer of a partnership in Moilliett's bank; and also an invitation by John (afterwards Sir John) Gladstone to join a proposed firm for the purpose of establishing a system of commercial agencies connecting England and the East. It was proposed that Nicholls should go out to organise branches at Bombay, Madras, Calcutta, Singapore, and Canton, and that a post should be reserved for him at Liverpool or London on his return.

== The Poor Law Commission ==
In the meantime the first poor-law commissioners, appointed in February 1832, had drawn up their report. Nicholls had been especially applied to by them (through Mr. Cowell, one of the assistant commissioners) in the course of their inquiries, and the report, published in February 1834, contains frequent favourable references to the system in work at Bingham and Southwell, the principles ultimately recommended as the basis of legislation being those which had been advocated in Nicholls's "Letters by an Overseer". The Poor Law Amendment Act 1834 was passed the same year, and in August Nicholls was appointed one of the three commissioners entrusted with its administration, the other two being Thomas Frankland Lewis (later succeeded by his son George Cornewall Lewis) and John Shaw-Lefevre (later succeeded by Edmund Head); Edwin Chadwick was appointed secretary.

Thenceforth Nicholls lived in London. The bank was very anxious to retain him at Birmingham, and he accepted his new office only under pressure from Lord Melbourne, and at some pecuniary loss to himself. He remained a member of the poor-law commission until its reconstitution in 1847. The question of the Irish poor law in the meantime became urgent; no feasible scheme was forthcoming till 1836, when Nicholls submitted to Lord John Russell, by request, certain "suggestions" on the subject. In June 1836, and again in the autumn of 1837, Nicholls was sent over to Ireland to inquire as to the best form of legislation. His two reports (dated respectively 15 Nov. 1836 and 3 Nov. 1837) were approved, and were to a great extent the foundation of the provisions of the Poor Relief (Ireland) Act 1838. He was also, early in 1838, sent by the government to the Netherlands and Belgium to make examination of the mode of administering relief and the condition of the poorer classes in those countries. His report is dated 5 May 1838. Upon the passing of the Irish act he was requested by government to superintend the early stages of its introduction, and he accordingly proceeded in September 1838 to Ireland, residing, with his wife and children, at Lis-an-iskea, Blackrock, Dublin. He did not return to London till November 1842. The task of directing the working of the measure proved very difficult, and his efforts were hampered by party opposition. The Irish poor law and its administration were subjected to violent criticism, both in and out of parliament; but the bitterest opponents bore testimony to Nicholls's character and ability.

On the reorganisation of the poor-law board in 1847, Nicholls became its "permanent" secretary, Lord Ebrington being appointed its "parliamentary" secretary. In April 1848 he was made a C.B., the appointment being one of the first batch following the extension of the order of civilians.

== Later life ==
In January 1851 he retired from office, through ill-health, with a pension and the title of K.C.B. (March 1851). The remainder of his life he chiefly devoted to writing on the poor and the poor laws. Between 1848 and 1857 he was consulted three times by persons making inquiries on behalf of the French government, and once by Professor Kries of Breslau, the object in all four cases being to obtain materials for proposed poor law legislation on the continent. He continued to take an active part in the affairs of the Birmingham Canal, and he was also a working member of the committee of the Rock Life Assurance Company.

On 24 March 1865 Nicholls died at his house, No. 17 (afterwards No. 1) Hyde Park Street, London.

His son Henry George Nicholls (1825–1867) was Perpetual Curate of the church of the Holy Trinity, East Dean in the Forest of Dean.

== Works ==
Nicholls was author of:

- ‘Eight Letters on the Management of our Poor and the General Administration of the Poor Laws. By an Overseer,’ 1823.
- ‘Three Reports by George Nicholls, esq., to H. M. Principal Secretary of State for the Home Department,’ 1838.
- ‘The Farmer's Guide,’ Dublin, 1841.
- ‘The Farmer,’ London, 1844.
- ‘On the Condition of the Agricultural Labourer,’ 1847.
- ‘The Flax-Grower,’ 1848 (reprinted, with additions, from vol. viii. of Royal Agricultural Society's ‘Journal’).
- ‘A History of the English Poor Law,’ 2 vols., 1854.
- ‘A History of the Scotch Poor Law,’ 1856.
- ‘A History of the Irish Poor Law,’ 1856.

Sir George Nicholls History of the English Poor Law (originally 2 Vol.'s 1854) then published by J. Murray (1899) with Thomas Mackay Vol.III From 1834 to the Present Time

Sir George Nicholls, H.G. Willink A History of the English Poor Law (1904)

== Family ==
Nicholas married on 6 July 1813 Harriet, daughter of Brough Maltby of Southwell, Nottinghamshire. She survived her husband till May 1869. They had issue one son, the Rev. Henry George Nicholls (who married Caroline Maria, daughter of his uncle Solomon Nicholls), and seven daughters: Georgiana Elizabeth, Charlotte (who married W. F. Wingfield), Emily, Jane (who married Rev. P. T. Ouvry), Mary Grace, Harriet (who died in infancy), and Catharine Harriet (who married W. W. Willink).

== Notes ==
Attribution

This article incorporates text from a publication now in the public domain: "Nicholls, George". Dictionary of National Biography. London: Smith, Elder & Co. 1885–1900.
