= Alphonse de Malzac =

French diplomat turned slave trader (1822–1860)

Louis Isaac Alphonse de Malzac (22 June 1822 – April 1860) was a French diplomat turned slave trader and hunter. He is notably associated with his activities in Gondokoro, present-day South Sudan, where he died.

== Biography ==
Born in Sauve, Gard, France on 22 June 1822, de Malzac left on a diplomatic mission to Egypt in 1850 but became a slave trader there. One of the first French people, he entered Bahr el Ghazal, founded Rumbek in 1858 and had himself proclaimed "King of the White Nile".

With his own army, he sows terror and goes up the Nile. Alexandre Vayssière, who accompanied him at the beginning for his ivory trade, as well as the Austrian vice-consul in Khartoum, Joseph Natterer, disavowed his methods and separated from him.

He died in April 1860 at Gondokoro while preparing an expedition to the sources of the Nile with Alfred Peney.
