= Southover Manor School =

Location
- Southover High Street; Lewes, East Sussex; England

Information
- Type: Private boarding school
- Established: 1924
- Founder: Winifred Ponsonby
- Closed: 1988
- Gender: girls
- Age: 11 to 18

Southover Manor School was a private boarding school for girls at Lewes, East Sussex, with a preparatory department.

== History ==
The school was founded in 1924 at Lewes by Winifred Ponsonby. Initially a convent school, it was based at Southover Manor, which later became a Grade II listed building.

In 1937, a Southover girl won a major scholarship to Newnham College, Cambridge. During the Second World War, the school was evacuated from Lewes to Firle Place, and in January 1940 the school announced that "Southover French Finishing School, specializing in French language and literature, and French cooking and dressmaking, will be opened after Easter in a country house near Lewes, under the direction of M. le Baron and Madame la Baronne de Saint-Péreuse". The school’s buildings in Lewes were taken over by the 6th Field Regiment of the Royal Regiment of Canadian Artillery.

In about 1960, the mother of one girl was said to have chosen the school "on account of the pleasing decoration in the headmistress's study".

By 1963, the school was "recognized as efficient" by the Ministry of Education.

On 30 May 1974, the school marked its Golden Jubilee with an event at Goldsmiths' Hall, in the City of London. In 1979, the number of girls in the school was reported as 125.

In 1983, the school had 120 girls, of whom 110 were boarders. The core curriculum then consisted of English, History, Geography, Maths, French, Physics, Chemistry, Biology, Music and Physical Education. In that year, plans for the future closure of the school were set in motion and Lewes District Council produced a development brief for its land.

In July 1984, the school closed and its premises were sold in June 1985, the proceeds being used to establish Southover Manor General Educational Trust Limited, the object of which is "to advance for the public benefit the education of boys and girls under the age of 25 years in any manner being exclusively charitable as the Governing Body of the Trust may from time to time determine". Houses were built on the school's former playing fields, street names including Cluny Street.

Records of the school and its educational trust between the years 1939 and 1988 are held at the East Sussex Record Office, accession number ACC 9256. Draft conveyances and leases for the school between 1929 and 1939 (part of the papers of Adams and Remers of Lewes, Solicitors) are also in the Record Office.

== Headmistresses ==
- 1929–1959: Miss J. I. E. Aspden, d. 1963
- 1959–1970: Priscilla Stucley, Countess Zamoyska
- 1970–1980: Mrs M. B. Proctor (later Lady Downward), died aged 83 in 2008.
- 1980–1986: Mrs Edward Forrest LGSM LTCL

== Notable old girls ==
- Maryam d'Abo (born 1960)
- Queen Camilla (born 1947)
- Chryssie Lytton Cobbold, Baroness Cobbold (1940–2024)
- Dione Digby, Lady Digby (born 1934), National Rivers Authority
- Christina Dodwell (born 1951)
- Lady Mary Fagan (born 1939), Lord-Lieutenant of Hampshire, 1994-2014
- Nicky Ferguson (died 2007), botanical author
- Sarah-Jane Gaselee (born 1970)
- Lady Annabel Goldsmith (1934–2025)
- Katherine Hamilton (born 1954), artist
- Kelly LeBrock (born 1960)
- Hermione, Countess of Ranfurly (1913–2000), author
- Pamela Sharples, Baroness Sharples (born 1923)
