= Henry George Nicholls =

English clergyman and historian

- Born: 1825
- Died: 1867 (aged 41–42); London
- Education: M.A.
- Alma mater: Trinity College, Cambridge
- Known for: Historical Writing
- Title: Rev.

Henry George Nicholls (1825–1867) was Perpetual curate of the church of the Holy Trinity, East Dean−, in the Forest of Dean. He wrote three books on the area and its history. His work includes information on such landmarks as St Briavels Castle and Speech House. His descriptions and historical information continue to be cited as authority concerning the history of the area.

Nicholls was the only son of Sir George Nicholls, K.C.B. He was educated at Rugby School and Trinity College, Cambridge, where he received a B.A. in 1845 and an M.A. in 1848. He assumed his position at the church of the Holy Trinity in 1847 and held it until he died. He was married and was survived by twin boys.

== Works ==
- The Forest of Dean (1858)
- The Personalities of the Forest of Dean (1863)
- Iron Making in the olden times as instanced in the ancient mines, forges and furnaces of the forest of Dean (1866)
