= Bengal (1811 EIC ship) =

History

British East India Company
- Name: Bengal
- Owner: Gabriel Gillett
- Builder: Wells, Blackwall
- Launched: 18 December 1811
- Fate: Burnt January 1815

General characteristics
- Type: Ship
- Tons burthen: 950, or 95034/94, or 955, or 992 (bm)
- Length: Overall: 149 ft 4 in (45.5 m); Keel:120 ft 1 3/8 in (36.6 m) (keel)
- Beam: 38 ft 8 in (11.8 m)
- Depth of hold: 15 ft 0 1/2 in (4.6 m) l
- Propulsion: Sail
- Complement: 110
- Armament: 22 × 18-pounder guns + 10 × 18-pounder carronades
- Notes: Three decks

Bengal was launched in 1811 as an East Indiaman for the British East India Company (EIC). She made one voyage for the EIC, but was burnt on the inbound leg of her second voyage.

EIC voyage #1 (1812–1813): Captain George Nicholls acquired a letter of marque on 25 January 1812. He sailed from Portsmouth on 10 March 1812, bound for Madras and Bengal. Bengal reached Madras on 9 July, and arrived at Diamond Harbour on 25 July. Homeward bound, she was at Saugor on 16 October, reached St Helena on 14 February 1813, and arrived at Long Reach on 16 May.

EIC voyage #2 (1814-Loss): Captain Nicholls sailed from Portsmouth on 10 May 1814, bound for Madras and Bengal. Bengal was among the Indiamen planning to leave Bengal on 3 January 1815, touching at Pointe de Galle, Ceylon, and the Cape of Good Hope on their way to England. She was at Pointe de Galle when a mistake by the gunner on 18 January 1815 led to a fire breaking out. The fire raced through Bengal killing 20 people, but all the women and children survived. The fleet was preparing to leave the next day under the escort of HMS Malacca and several of dead were officers and men from vessels that sent boats to help. Among the casualties were a lieutenant from Malacca, and her master.

The EIC valued the cargo it lost on Bengal at £87,738.
