= George Bampfylde =

George Bampfylde may refer to:

- George Bampfylde, 1st Baron Poltimore (1786–1858), British peer
- George Wentworth Warwick Bampfylde, 4th Baron Poltimore (1882–1965), British peer and landowner
