= Alexine Tinne =

Dutch explorer, photographer (1835–1869)

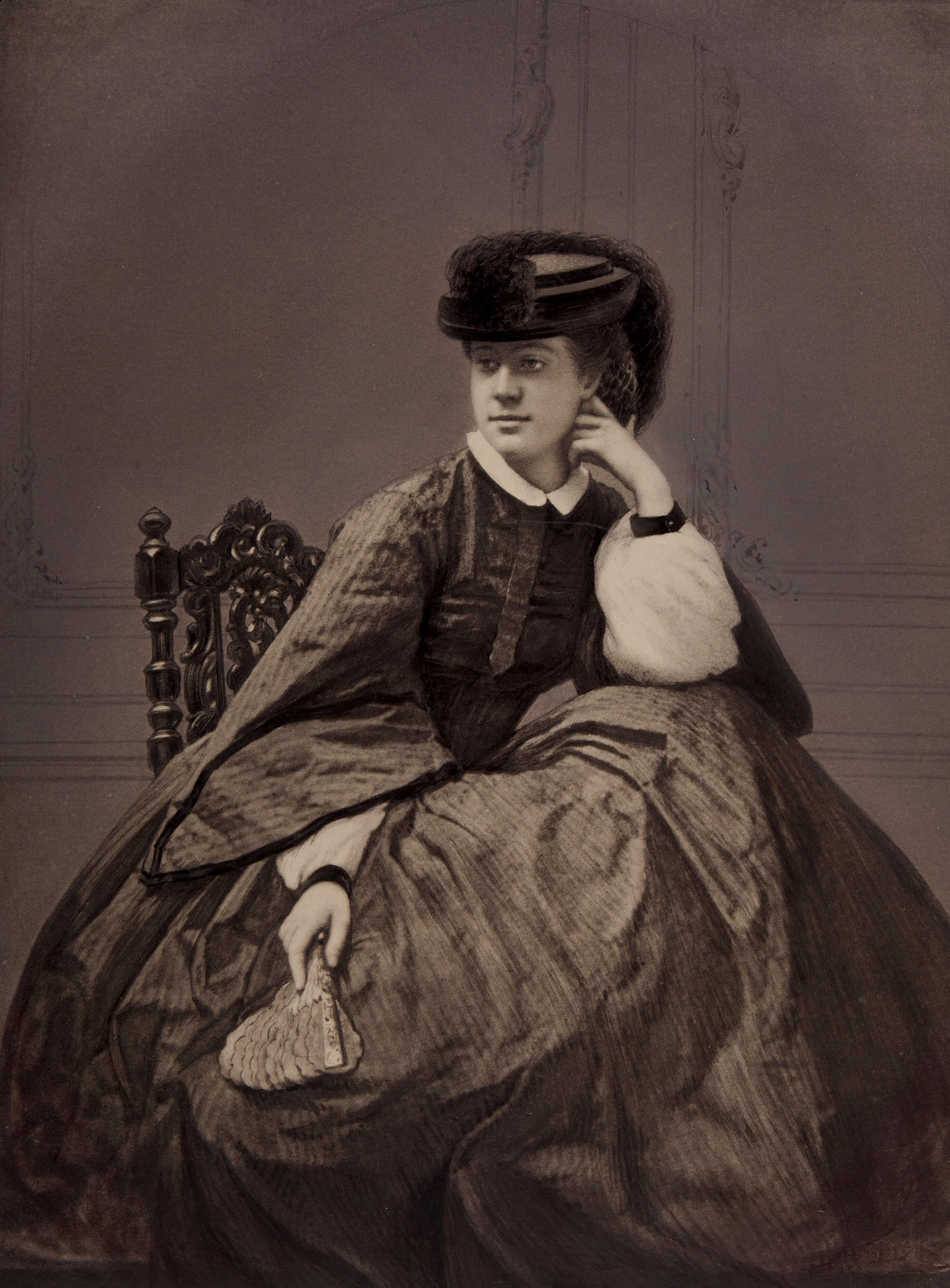
- Born: 17 October 1835; The Hague, Netherlands
- Died: 1 August 1869 (aged 33); Tripolitania, Ottoman Empire
- Occupation: Explorer

Alexandrine "Alexine" Pieternella Françoise Tinne (17 October 1835 – 1 August 1869) was a Dutch explorer in Africa who was the first European woman to attempt to cross the Sahara. She was an early photographer.

== Early life ==
Alexine Tinne was the daughter of Philip Frederik Tinne and his second wife, Baroness Henriette van Capellen. Philip Tinne was a Dutch merchant, who was heavily involved in the transatlantic spice trade. He worked at coffee plantations in Demerara (a Dutch and then British colony in modern Guyana). In 1813, Philip Tinne became a full partner in the Liverpool firm Sandbach, Tinne & Company, a firm which from 1782 until the 1920s, owned ships and plantations, engaging in both slavery and the transport of slaves and sugar. Philip Tinne settled in England during the Napoleonic Wars and later returned to his native land, marrying Henriette, daughter of a Dutch Vice-Admiral, Theodorus Frederik van Capellen, and Petronella de Lange, a lady-in-waiting to Queen Sofia. Alexine was born when Philip was sixty-three.

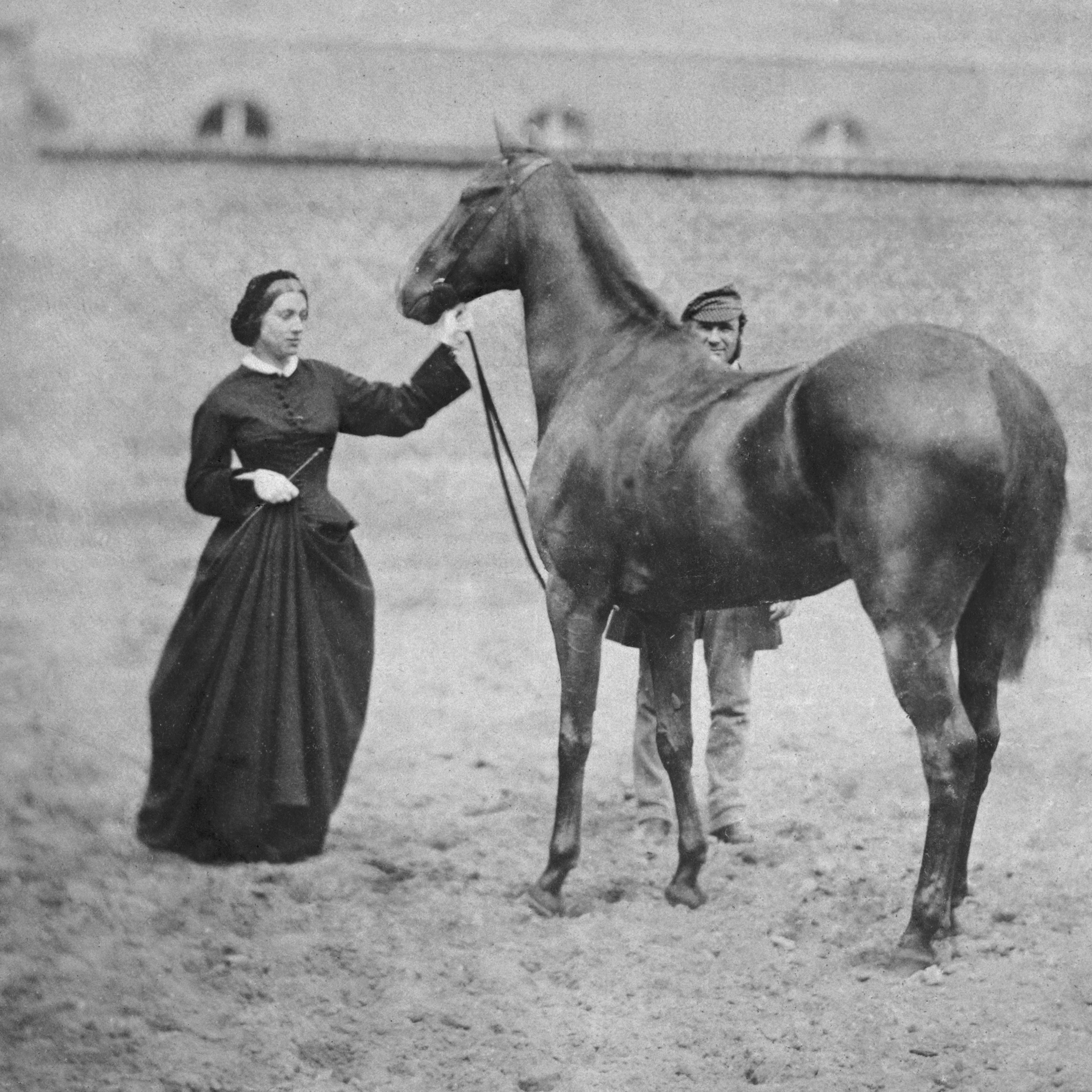
Tinne around 1860

Tinne was tutored at home and showed proficiency at painting, piano, languages, photography and geography. Her father died when she was ten years old. The immense wealth of her father, much of which was amassed due to his activities in the spice and sugar trade (when slavery was abolished in 1833, his company was awarded £150,452, the second-largest payment made to any mercantile concern), resulted in the young girl becoming the richest female in the Netherlands.

Tinne started experimenting with photography in her home town of The Hague and its harbour Scheveningen. She worked with several commercial photographers: Robert Jefferson Bingham (who visited The Hague), Francis Frith (whom she met in Egypt) and the J. Geiser photostudio in Algiers.

== Africa ==
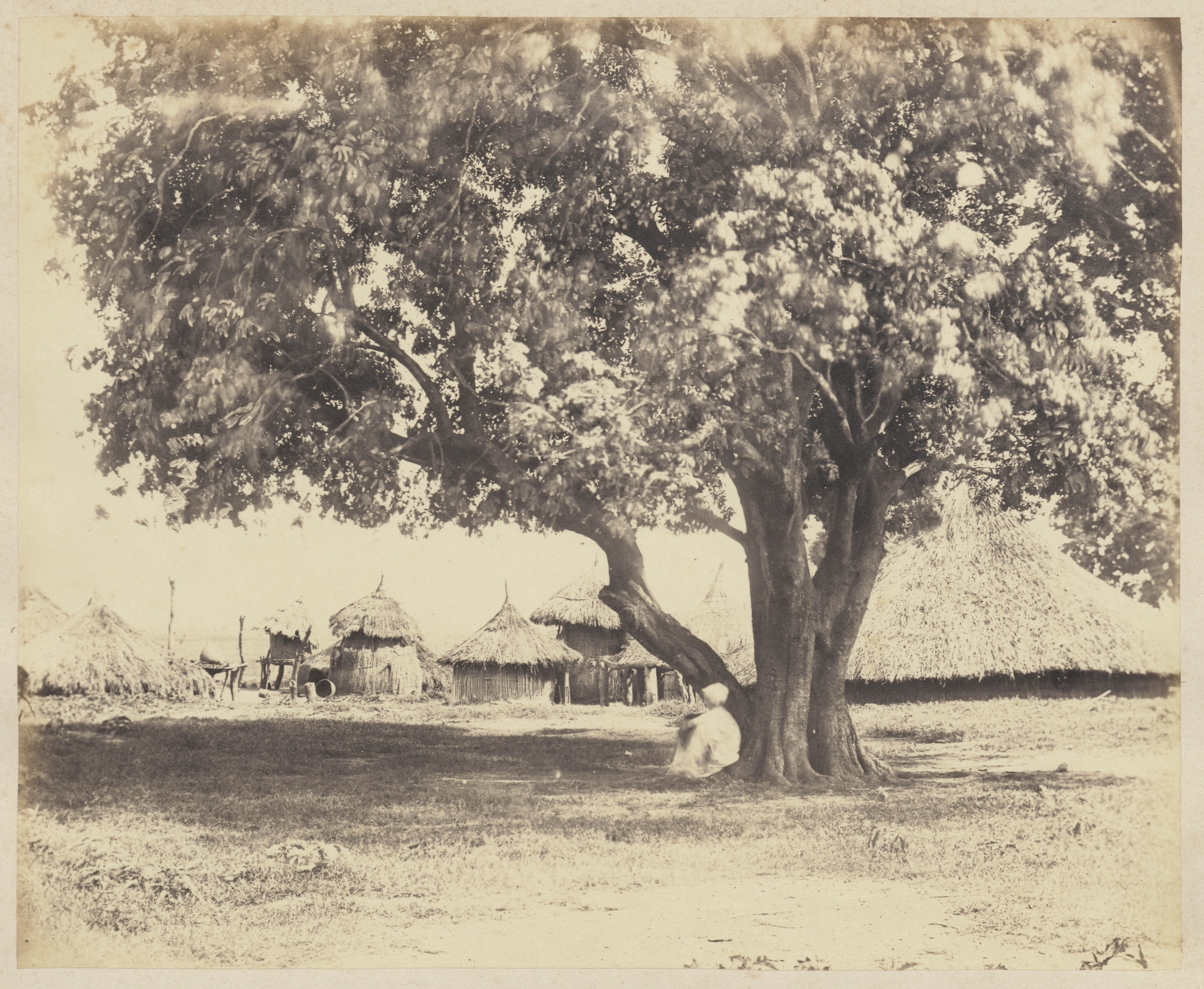
Gondokoro (Sudan); photograph by Tinne (1862) Leiden University Libraries

Accompanied by her mother Harriette and her aunt, Tinne left Europe in the summer of 1861 for the White Nile region. After a short stay at Khartoum, the party traveled up the White Nile and became the first European women to reach Gondokoro. She fell ill and they were forced to return, reaching Khartoum on 20 November. Directly after their return, Theodor von Heuglin and Hermann Steudner met the Tinnes and the four of them planned to travel to the Bahr-el-Ghazal, a tributary of the White Nile, to reach the countries of the 'Niam-Niam' (Azande). Heuglin and Steudner left Khartoum on 25 January, ahead of the rest of the expedition; the Tinnes following on 5 February. Heuglin also had geographical exploration in mind, intending to explore the uncharted region beyond the river and to ascertain how far westward the Nile basin extended. He also intended to investigate the reports of a vast lake in Central Africa eastwards of those already known, most likely the lake-like expanses of the middle Congo.

Ascending the Bahr-el-Ghazal, the limit of navigation was reached on 10 March. From Mishra-er-Rek, a journey was made overland, across the Bahr Jur and south-west by the Bahr Kosango to Jebel Kosango, on the borders of the Niam-Niam country. During the journey, all of the travellers suffered severely from fever. A student died in April and Tinne's mother in July, followed by two Dutch maids. After much travel and dangers, the remainder of the party reached Khartoum at the end of March 1864, when Tinne's aunt, who had stayed in Khartoum, died. Tinne buried her aunt and one maid and brought the corpse of her mother and the other maid back to Cairo. John Tinne, her half-brother from Liverpool, visited in January–February 1865, with the intention of persuading her to return home with him. Tinne was not to be persuaded and John left with the two corpses and a large part of her ethnographic collection. Her mother's body later was buried at the Oud Eik en Duinen Cemetery in The Hague. Tinne's ethnographic collection was donated by John to the Public Museum (now the Liverpool World Museum).

Tinne successfully photographed during her 1862–1864 trip up the Nile and in the Bahr-el-Ghazal region, making her the author of the first known views of Gondokoro (1862), as well as of inhabitants of the areas explored. The extreme rarity of these photographs led them to be used as models for engravings illustrating several articles and books on these regions in the 1860s and 1870s.

Her botanical collections were described in a book entitled Plantae Tinneanae. It included the description of the new genus Blastania. Crinum tinneanum Kotschy & Peyr. [Amaryllidaceae; present name Ammocharis tinneana (Kotschy & Peyr.) Milne-Redh. & Schweick] was named in her honour.

At Cairo, Tinne lived in Oriental style during the next four years, visiting Algeria, Tunisia, and other parts of the Mediterranean. An attempt to reach the Touaregs in 1868 from Algiers failed.

== Some photographs by Alexine Tinne ==
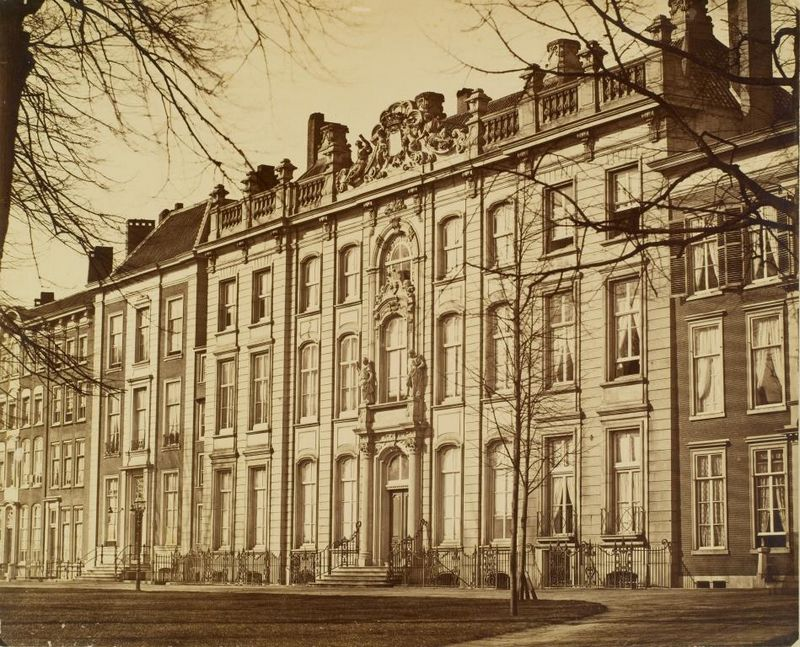
The Hague (1860–61)

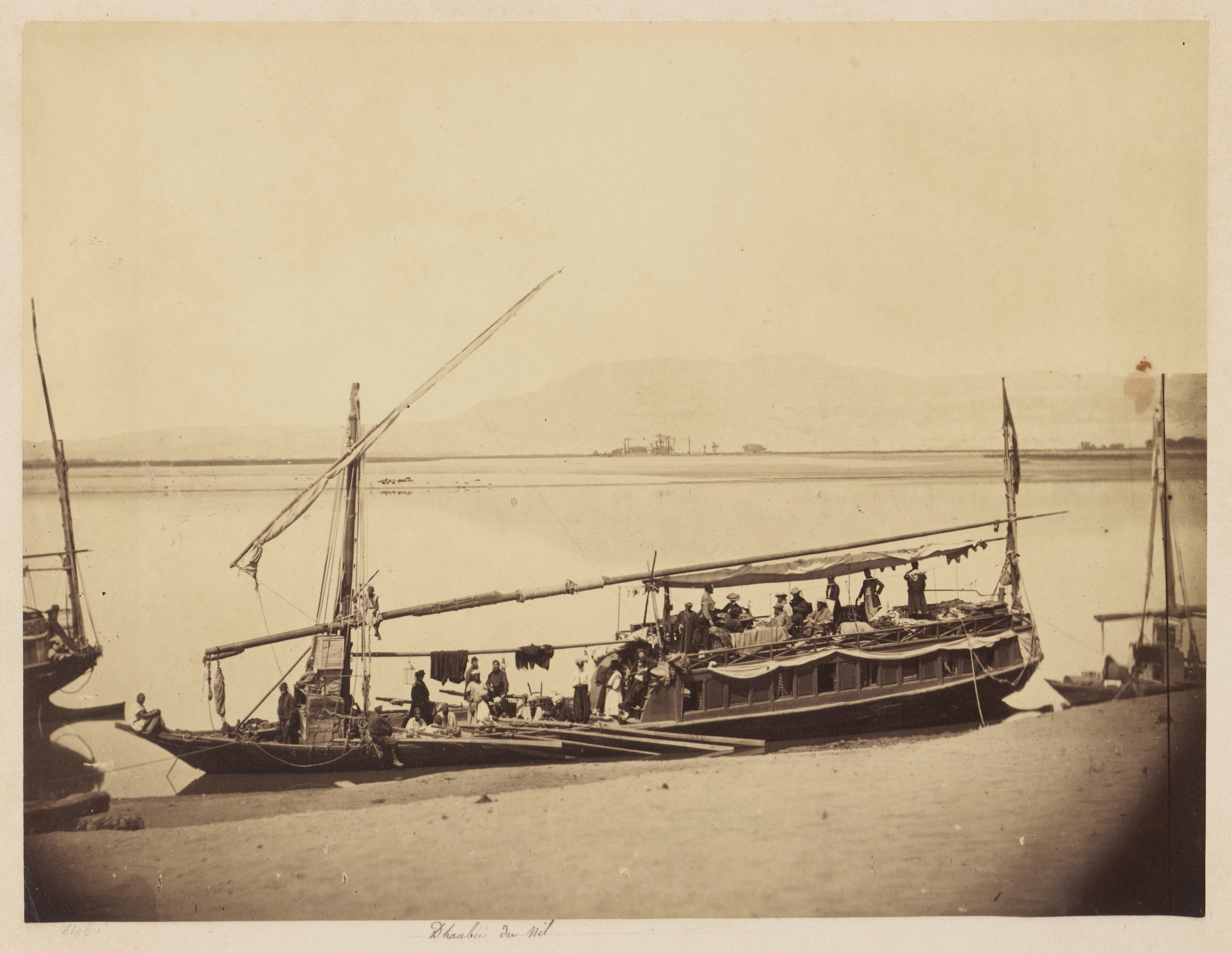
Dahabeah on the Nile at Thebes (1862)

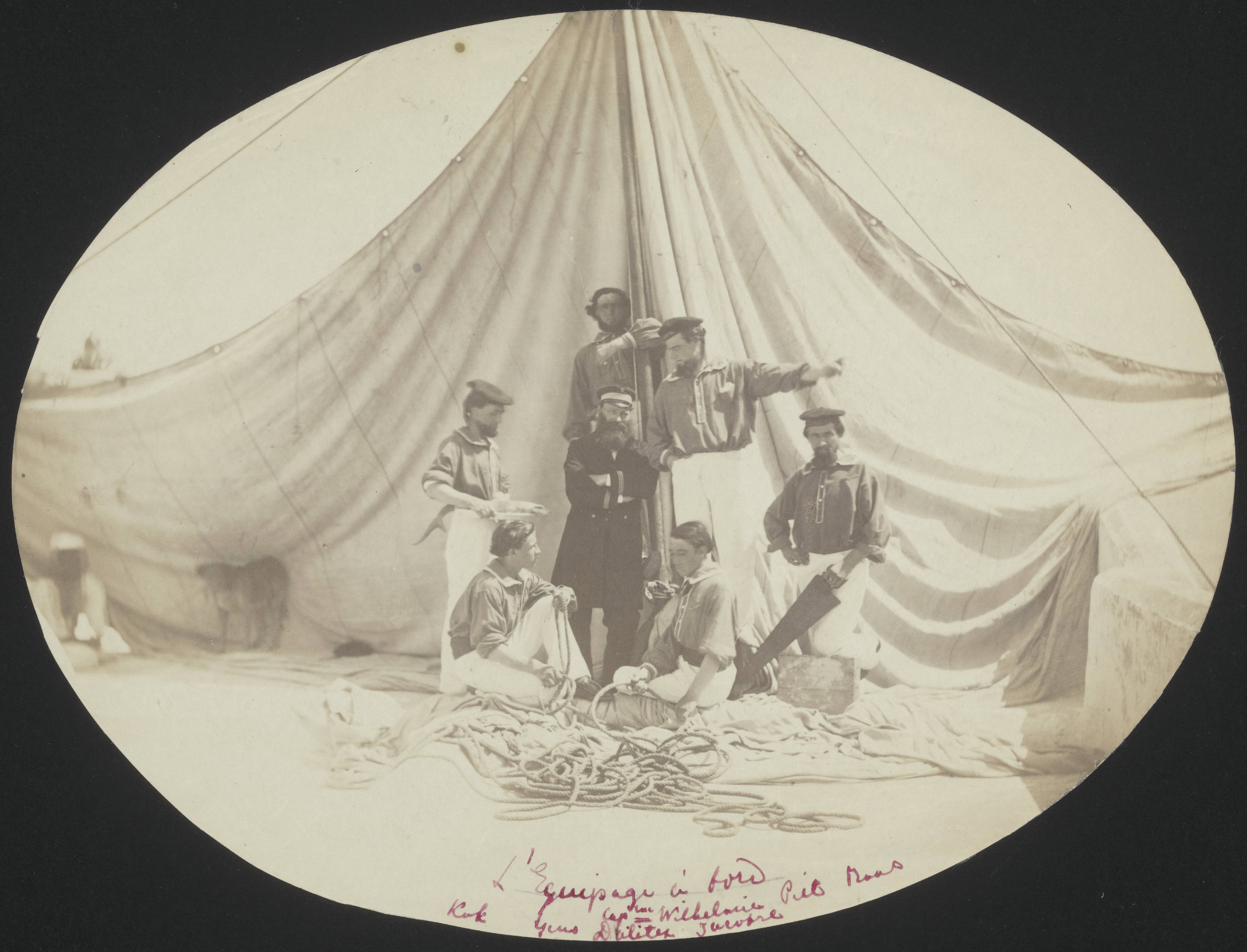
Algiers (1866)

== Sahara and death ==
In January 1869, Tinne again made an attempt to reach the Touaregs. She started from Tripoli with a caravan, with the intention of traveling to Lake Chad, followed by Wadai, Darfur and Kordofan before reaching the upper Nile. In Murzuq, she met the German explorer Gustav Nachtigal, with whom she intended to cross the desert. As Nachtigal wanted to go to the Tibesti Mountains first, she set out for the South on her own. Her caravan advanced slowly. Due to her diseases (attacks of gout and inflammation of her eyes), she was not able to maintain order in her group.

In the early morning of 1 August, on the route from Murzuk to Ghat, she was murdered together with two Dutch sailors in her party, allegedly by Tuareg people in league with her escort. According to statements at the trial in Tripoli in December 1869–January 1870, two blows of a sword — one in her neck, one on one of her hands — made her collapse. They left her to bleed to death.

There are several theories as to the motive, none of them proven. One is that her guides believed that her iron water tanks were filled with gold. It is also possible that her death came as a result of an internal political conflict between local Tuareg chiefs. Another explorer, Erwin von Bary, who visited the same area in the 1870s, met participants of the assault and learned that it had been a blow against the "great old man" of the Northern Tuaregs, Ikhenukhen, who was to be removed from his powerful position, and the means was to be the killing of the Christians — just to prove that Ikhenukhen was too weak to protect travelers. Given the internal strife among the Northern Tuareg that lasted until the Ottoman occupation of the Fezzan Province (Southern Libya), this version is the most probable explanation of the otherwise unmotivated massacre.

== Legacy ==
Scottish missionary explorer David Livingstone paid tribute to Tinne in his last journal, writing the following in November 1868 as he waited on the northern shore of Lake Mweru to continue his journey to Ujiji. In a passage about contributions by explorers to knowledge of the source of the Nile, such as Burton, Speke, Grant and Baker, he wrote:

"But none rises higher in my estimation than the Dutch lady, Miss Tinne, who, after the severest domestic afflictions, nobly persevered in the teeth of every difficulty, and only turned away from the object of her expedition after being assured by Speke and Grant that they had already discovered in Victoria Nyanza the sources she sought. Had they not given their own mistaken views, the wise foresight by which she provided a steamer would inevitably have led her to pull up, and by canoes to reach Lake Bangweolo's sources, full five hundred miles south of the most southerly part of Victoria Nyanza. She evidently possesses some of the indomitable pluck of Van Tromp [Admiral Maarten Tromp], whose tomb every Englishman who goes to Holland must see . . . were she not a Dutch lady already, we think she ought to be made a duchess".

It was believed that Tinne's collections of ethnographic specimens in Liverpool were destroyed in 1941 during a bombing raid. The church built in her memory in The Hague was similarly destroyed. Recent research revealed however that around 75% (over 100 objects) of her ethnographic collection survived the air raid. Besides their value as a document of her two Sudan journeys, her collection, drawings, the majority of her photographs are at The Hague museum together some of the contemporary ones of Heuglin at Stuttgart (the Linden Museum), represent rare specimens of unverified (no provenance) of an early date belonging to material cultures in Sudan whoever took them.

A small marker near Juba in Sudan commemorating the Nile explorers of the 19th century bears Tinne's name, as well as a window plaque in Tangiers. Many of her remaining papers, including most of her letters from Africa, are stored at the National Archive in The Hague. Her photographs are at the National Archive and the Municipal Archive of The Hague.

In 2024 Leiden University Library acquired eighteen unverified ( unchecked provenance ) photos made by Alexine Tinne in 1862 in Nubia and Sudan, including in the village of Gondokoro. These are among the earliest images taken in the heart of the African continent.
