= Gondokoro =

- Island
- Location in South Sudan
- Coordinates: 4°54′26″N 31°39′41″E
- Country: South Sudan
- State: Central Equatoria
- County: Juba County
- Time zone: UTC+2 (CAT)

Gondokoro (formerly Ismailïa) island is located in Central Equatoria. The island was a trading station on the east bank of the White Nile in Southern Sudan, 1,200 kilometres (750 mi) south of Khartoum. Its importance lay in the fact that it was within a few kilometres of the limit of navigability of the Nile from Khartoum upstream. From this point the journey south to Uganda was continued overland.

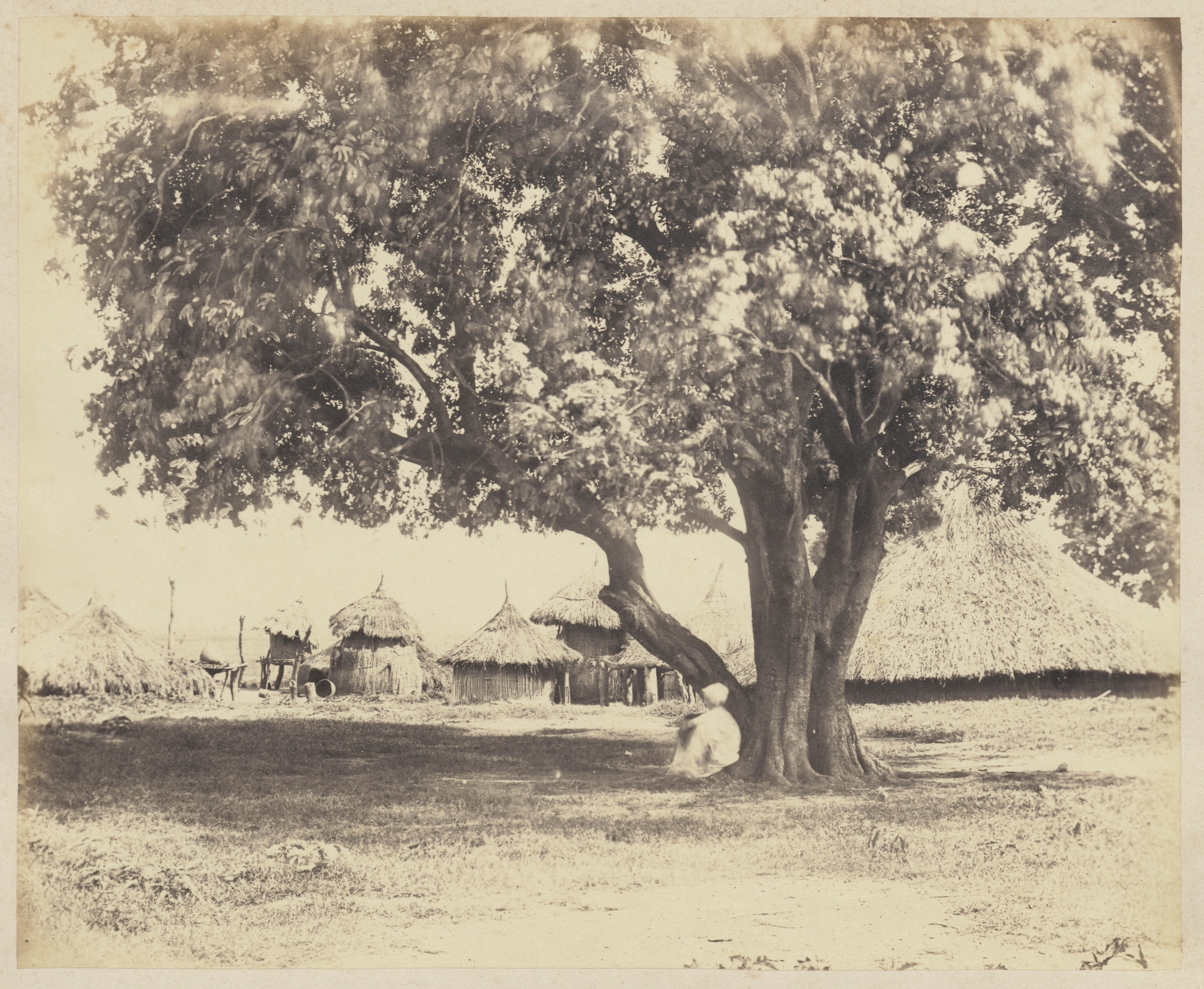
Gondokoro in 1862, photograph by Alexine Tinne

The Austrian Catholic missionary Ignatius Knoblecher set up a mission there in 1852. It was abandoned in 1859. In 1862, the explorer Alexine Tinne became the first person to photograph the town. Gondokoro was the scene for the arrival of John Hanning Speke and James Augustus Grant after their two years and five months long journey through Central Africa from Zanzibar. They arrived exhausted on February 13, 1863, and expected to be met by the British consul John Petherick and his rescue party. As Petherick was away hunting in the countryside, the two explorers instead were welcomed by Samuel Baker and his wife Florence Baker, who greeted them with a cup of tea.

In 1874, Charles George Gordon seized the town in favor of the khedive of the Khedivate of Egypt, thus ensuring Egypt's rule over all of southern Sudan (then the province of Equatoria).

A passage from Alan Moorehead´s The White Nile (p. 61) describes it as: "The sportsman Samuel Baker and his wife had come up the Nile to look for them, and there had been others as well who had arrived at Gondokoro on the same mission, three Dutch ladies, the Baroness van Capellan and Mrs and Miss Tinne, but they had been forced to return to Khartoum through sickness. ... 'Speke', Baker says, 'appeared the more worn of the two: he was excessively lean, but in reality he was in good tough condition; he had walked the whole way from Zanzibar, never having once ridden during that wearying march. Grant was in honourable rags; his bare knees projecting through the remnants of trousers that were an exhibition of rough industry tailor's work.'"

Theodore Roosevelt passed through Gondokoro on the Smithsonian–Roosevelt African Expedition with his son, Kermit Roosevelt, Edgar Alexander Mearns, Edmund Heller, and John Alden Loring.

Other explorers died there, such as Wilhelm von Harnier, Alphonse de Malzac, Alfred Peney and Alexandre Vaudey.

Gondokoro was the furthest navigable location at the Nile until around 1922, when the city of Juba was founded and the river was made navigable to this new point. At that time, the site of Gondokoro lost its importance as a travel hub. Other notable nearby settlements besides Juba include Lado and Rejaf (Rageef).
