= Bahr el-Ghazal =

Bahr el-Ghazal (Arabic: بحر الغزال, also transliterated Bahr al-Ghazal, Baḥr al-Ghazāl, Bahr el-Gazel, or versions of these without the hyphen) may refer to two distinct places, both named after ephemeral or dry rivers.

== Chad ==
- Bahr el-Ghazal (wadi in Chad), a dry riverbed in central Chad
- Bahr el Gazel (region of Chad), an administrative region of Chad
  - Bahr el Gazel Nord, a department in the region
  - Bahr el Gazel Sud, a department in the region
  - Bahr el Gazel Department, former name of the region

== South Sudan ==
- Bahr el Ghazal (region of South Sudan), a geographic region of northwestern South Sudan
- Bahr el Ghazal River, a river in South Sudan
- Northern Bahr el Ghazal, a former state in South Sudan
- Western Bahr el Ghazal, a former state in South Sudan

== See also ==
- Bahr (disambiguation)
- Ghazal (disambiguation)
