= Thomas Mackay =

British classical liberal (1849–1912)

Thomas Mackay (1849 – 1912) was a British wine merchant and classical liberal.

== Life ==
Mackay, the son of a colonel, was born in Edinburgh and educated at Glenalmond. He matriculated at New College, Oxford in 1868, graduating B.A. in 1873; he entered the Inner Temple in 1871. He was called to the bar in 1879 but left to enter the wine trade because he felt that he was not earning enough to support his wife and family. He retired ten years later in order to campaign for liberalism.

He criticised old age pensions because he believed they would harm character and advocated reducing "the encouragement to pauperism held out by our present system of out-door relief" by restoring independence. Also, Mackay did not favour a compromise between individualism and socialism: "Those who talk of compromise seem not to realize that the knell of the period of compromise has sounded...We are falling under a tyranny more absolute and unrelenting than anything the world has ever seen".

== Publications ==
- The English Poor (1889).
- (editor), A Plea for Liberty (1891).
- "The Joining of Issues", Economic Review, 1 (1891), pp. 194–202.
- "People's Banks", National Review, 22 (1894), pp. 634–47.
- "Empiricism in Politics", National Review, 25 (1895), pp. 790–803.
- "Old Age Pensions", Quarterly Review, 182 (1895), pp. 254–80.
- "Politicians and the Poor Law", Fortnightly Review, 57 (1895), p. 408.
- Methods of Social Reform: Essays Critical and Constructive (1896).
- The State and Charity (1898).
- History of the English Poor Law with Sir George Nicholls (1899) Vol.III From 1834 to the Present Time.
- Public Relief of the Poor Law: Six Letters (1901).
- 'The Mandible' (1902)
