= James Augustus Grant =

Scottish explorer of Africa (1827–1892)

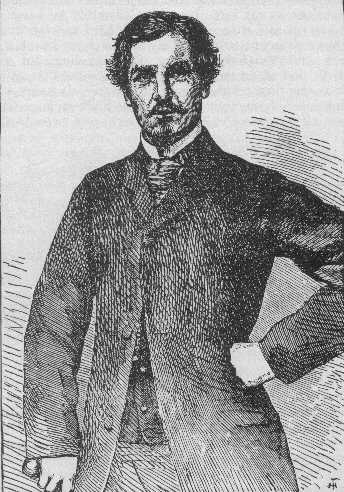
- Born: 11 April 1827; Nairn, Scotland
- Died: 11 February 1892 (aged 64); Nairn, Scotland
- Education: Nairn Academy; Aberdeen Grammar School; Marischal College; University of Aberdeen
- Occupations: Explorer, author, army officer
- Spouse: Margaret Thompson Laurie (m. 1865)
- Children: 5
- Relatives: James Augustus Grant (son); Thomas Mackay (son-in-law)
- Awards: CB, CSI, FRS, FRGS
- Military career
- Allegiance: (United Kingdom) British Empire
- Branch: Bengal Army
- Service years: 1848–1868
- Rank: Lieutenant-colonel
- Conflicts: Sikh War; Indian Mutiny; 1868 Expedition to Abyssinia

Lieutenant-Colonel James Augustus Grant CB CSI FRS FRGS (11 April 1827 – 11 February 1892) was a Scottish explorer of eastern equatorial Africa. He made contributions to the journals of various learned societies, the most notable being the "Botany of the Speke and Grant Expedition" in vol. xxix of the Transactions of the Linnean Society. He married in 1865 and settled down at Nairn, where he died in 1892. He was buried in the crypt of St Paul's Cathedral. Grant's gazelle, one of the largest gazelles in Africa, was named after him.

== Early life ==
Grant was born at Nairn in the Scottish Highlands, where his father was the parish minister, and educated at Nairn Academy, Aberdeen Grammar School and Marischal College, Aberdeen. In 1846 he joined the Indian army. He saw active service in the Sikh War (1848–49), served throughout the Indian Mutiny of 1857, and was wounded in the operations for the relief of Lucknow.

== African expeditions ==
He returned to England in 1858, and in 1860 joined John Hanning Speke in the memorable expedition which solved the problem of the Nile sources. The expedition left Zanzibar in October 1860 and reached Gondokoro, where the travellers were again in touch with what they regarded as civilization, in February 1863. Speke was the leader, but Grant carried out several investigations independently and made valuable botanical collections. He acted throughout in absolute loyalty to his comrade.

In 1864 he published, as supplementary to Speke's account of their journey, A Walk across Africa, in which he dealt particularly with "the ordinary life and pursuits, the habits and feelings of the natives" and the economic value of the countries traversed. In 1864 he was awarded the Patron's Medal of the Royal Geographical Society, and in 1866 given the Companionship of the Bath in recognition of his services in the expedition.

Grant served in the intelligence department of the Abyssinian expedition of 1868; for this he was made a Companion of the Order of the Star of India and received the Abyssinian War Medal. At the close of the war he retired from the army with the rank of lieutenant-colonel.

== Grant's illness in Africa ==
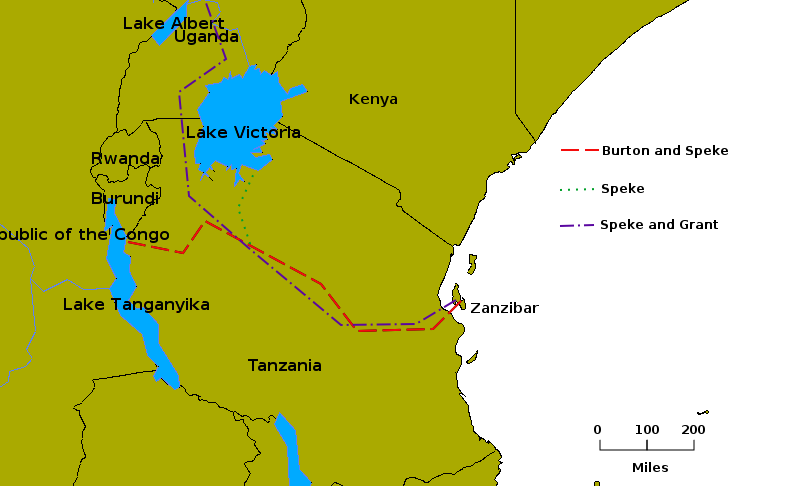
Routes taken by the expeditions of Burton and Speke (1857–1858) and Speke and Grant (1863).

In his book, A Walk across Africa, Grant gives the following description of his illness, which broke out when they reached the native kingdom of Karague, on the western side of Lake Victoria in December 1861.

(page 151): "The following account of my own ailments I give, not with a wish to parade them, but in order to convey information:- Having had fevers twice a month, in December my usual complaint assumed a new form. The right leg, from above the knee, became deformed with inflammation, and remained for a month in this unaccountable state, giving intense pain, which was relieved temporarily by a deep incision and copious discharge. For three months abscesses formed, and other incisions were made; my strength was prostrated; the knee stiff and alarmingly bent, and walking was impracticable. Many cures were sought out and attempted by the natives, who all may have sympathized with me in my sufferings, which they saw were scarcely endurable; but I had great faith – was all along cheerful and happy, except at the crises of this helpless state, when I felt it would have been preferable to be nearer home. The disease ran its course, and daily, to bring out the accumulated discharge, I stripped my leg like a leech. Bombay (Sidi Mubarak Bombay) (an Interpreter, a Guide and Explorer) had heard of a poultice made of cow-dung, salt, and mud from the lake; this was placed on hot, but merely produced the effect of a tight bandage. Baraka (another interpreter) was certain a serpent had spat upon my leg- "it could not have been a bite". Dr. M'nanagee, the sultan's brother, knew the disease perfectly; he could send me a cure for it – and a mild gentle peasant of the Wanyambo race came with his wife, a young pleasing like person, to attend me. With the soft touch of a woman he examined the limb, made cuts over the skin with a penknife, ordered all lookers-on outside the hut, when his wife produced a scroll of plantain-leaf, in which was a black paste. This was moistened from the mouth and rubbed into the bleeding cuts, making them smart; afterwards a small piece of lava was dangled against my leg and tied as a charm round the ankle. .....

These cures had no apparent effect, but the disease did improve. By the fifth month the complaint had exhausted itself; at last I was able to be out of the hut inhaling the sweet air, and once more permitted to behold the works of God's creation in the beautiful lake and hills below me.

(page 187): By the end of March 1862 there were some hopes of my leaving Karague to join Speke in Buganda, Uganda. The king (Muteesa I of Buganda) had sent an officer and forty of his men to convey me up to the (Buganda) kingdom I so long wished to see. .... .... Being unable to walk, I was placed in a wicker stretcher (14 April 1862), and trotted off on the heads of four Waganda (Baganda, tribesmen of the area).

Capt Grant leaving Karague

(pages 189–90): On our journey, the stretcher was changed from head to the shoulder of the Waganda, who went at the rate of six miles an hour, jostling and paining my limb unmercifully. The coach and four, as I may term it, was put down every mile, or less, that the bearers might rest, laugh, joke, .... One great difficulty was to make them carry the conveyance so that the country in front could be seen in travelling; this they, for some reason, refused to do, and persisted in carrying me head first, instead of feet (fig 1-10).

(page 210): The stretcher which had carried me part of the way from Karague had been discarded, as the Waganda saw my only ailment was lameness and a stiff knee joint.

(page 246-7): (July 1862). Speke asked me whether I was able to make a flying march of it with him, while the baggage might be sent on towards Unyoro. At that time I was positively unable to walk twenty miles a day, especially miles of Uganda marching, through bogs and over rough ground. I therefore yielded reluctantly to the necessity of our parting; and I am anxious to be explicit on this point, as some have hastily inferred that my companion did not wish me to share in the gratification of seeing the river. Nothing could be more contrary to the fact. My state of health alone prevented me from accompanying Speke to set at rest for geographers the latitude of the interesting locality, as to which we were perfectly satisfied from native reports.

Grant's illness prevented him from being with Speke when Speke became the first white man to see the outpouring of the White Nile from Lake Victoria. It may be the first recorded case and first description of Mycobacterium ulcerans infection (Buruli ulcer). The print in his book shows Grant being carried on a wicker stretcher, leaving Karague.

== Family ==
Grant married in 1865 Margaret Thompson Laurie, daughter of Andrew Laurie of Edinburgh, and an heiress of Sir Peter Laurie, her great-uncle. Their two sons became involved in Africa, James Augustus Grant as a surveyor and explorer, and Alister Grant (died 1900) was killed in the Second Anglo-Boer War. There were three daughters, Mary, Christian and Margaret. Their eldest daughter married in 1905 Thomas Mackay as his second wife, dying in 1907. Christian married Harry Goschen in 1893.
