= Guy Ruggles-Brise =

Captain Guy Edward Ruggles-Brise (15 June 1914 – 14 November 2000) was a British Second World War officer and High Sheriff of Essex

He was born Braintree, Essex on 15 June 1914, the second son of Sir Edward Ruggles-Brise MC TD JP DL He came from a landed family who had lived at Spains Hall, Finchingfield, Essex, since the 18th century. The original house can be traced to the Domesday survey. He was schooled at Eton College like his elder brother John Ruggles-Brise and joined the 104th (Essex Yeomanry) Field Brigade RA. In 1940, he was sent for Commando training to Scotland, where he met his future wife Elizabeth Knox, and they married soon after.

== Military career ==
As a captain, he departed with No 7 Commando for North Africa, where he was captured during the Raid on Bardia in 1941. He was handed over to the Italians and transferred to Naples by ship. As a prisoner of war, he was held at camp PG35 at Padula near Salerno from May 1942 until June 1943. After the Allies invaded Italy, he was sent to PG19 camp further north at Bologna before being transferred to Castello di Vincigliata PG12 in the latter days before the Italian armistice. The castle held some the highest ranking British and Commonwealth officers captured in the war, many during the campaigns in North Africa. They included Lieutenant General Sir Philip Neame VC, Air Marshal Owen Tudor Boyd, General Sir Richard O'Connor, as well as an old school-friend, Daniel Knox, 6th Earl of Ranfurly.

He was amongst the small party, including some NCOs, released by General Chiappe in September 1943. They were driven to Firenze Campo di Marte railway station from where a special train took them to Arezzo. The party eventually dispersed and spent many months with the partisans in the Apennines. He eventually made it to a safehouse with other Allied personnel. He and others from the safehouse including Rudolph Vaughan, John Combe, Ted Todhunter, Dan Ranfurly from Vincigliata, American diplomat Walter Orebaugh and American pilot Jack Reiter who had been shot down over Italy and had escaped from a military hospital to join the partisans, managed to reach the coast and put out to sea in a boat, which began to leak badly. After rowing and bailing for 24 hours, they were at last picked up by an Italian vessel which landed them at Ancona, from where they were shipped to brigade HQ on 30 May 1944. Lady Ranfurly featured this incident in her book of memoirs, To War with Whitaker.

== Later life ==
After the war, he became a member of the London Stock Exchange, a senior partner with Wontner, Dolphin & Francis, and a consultant with Brewin Dolphin & Co. He was High Sheriff of Essex (1967–68) and Vice-Chairman of Riding for Disabled Trust. He later bought an estate in Achnasheen, Scotland where he enjoyed the country life and deer stalking. His wife Elizabeth died in 1988 and he married Christine Margaret Fothergill-Spencer in 1994.

He died at the age of 86. He was survived by his second wife and three sons from his first marriage.
