= Edward Joseph Todhunter =

British soldier and High Sheriff of Essex (1900-1976)

Edward Joseph Todhunter TD DL

High Sheriff of Essex
- In office 1964–1965
- Preceded by: Col. Hugh Edward Hunter Jones
- Succeeded by: Andrew Hunter Carnwath

Personal details
- Born: 1900 Great Parndon, Essex, England
- Died: 1976 (aged 75–76) Wiltshire, England
- Spouse: Agnes Swire (m. 1927)
- Children: 1
- Education: Rugby School
- Military career
- Allegiance: United Kingdom
- Branch: British Army
- Service years: 1922–1945
- Rank: Brigadier
- Units: 104th (Essex Yeomanry) Brigade, Royal Field Artillery; Royal Horse Artillery
- Conflicts: World War II; North African campaign

Brigadier Edward Joseph Todhunter TD DL (1900–1976) was a British soldier and High Sheriff of Essex.

== Early life ==
Ted Todhunter was born on his family's estate of Kingsmoor House and Stewards farm in Great Parndon, Essex. He attended Rugby School, becoming a Cadet in the O.T.C division. In 1922 he was Gazetted as 2nd Lt. in the 104th (Essex Yeomanry) Brigade, Royal Field Artillery, rising to Lieutenant-Colonel.

== Second World War ==
During the Second World War, he served as a brigadier with the Royal Horse Artillery and was captured along with General Gambier-Parry by Italian forces at Mechili in Cyrenaica, North Africa in April 1941. He was initially taken to the same barracks as Major-General Sir Adrian Carton de Wiart, VC in Tripoli after which he was taken by ship to Naples and then on to the Villa Orsini near Sulmona. There he helped in the garden and ‘collected news from Italian newspapers, making a resume of them in English which he managed brilliantly’.

He was transferred in April 1942 to Castello di Vincigliata (PG12), which was a medieval castle near Florence for very high ranking officers. Amongst the captives were Major-General Sir Adrian Carton de Wiart VC, Air Marshal Owen Tudor Boyd, Lieutenant General Sir Philip Neame VC, Lieutenant-Colonel John Frederick Boyce Combe, General Sir Richard Nugent O'Connor and Daniel Knox, 6th Earl of Ranfurly, known as 'Dan' Ranfurly. He took on the role of camp librarian, which by the Spring of 1943 numbered nearly one thousand books. He was part of the tunnelling group that worked in shifts for over six months. The escape was successful: six officers escaped of which two managed to make Switzerland – New Zealand Brigadiers James Hargest and Reginald Miles.

He himself was able to escape during the Italian Armistice in September 1943 with the remaining officers and men. They branched off into the mountains, seeking refuge in the Monastery of Camaldoli. "He discovered a retired Dutch diplomat, close by, and he and O’Connor used to listen to the news on their wireless". He joined the Italian partisans known as the Garibaldi Brigade Romagna under the leadership of Libero Riccardo Fedel, who during the winter of 1943/4 helped dozens of allied prisoners to escape. By May 1944 he reached Allied lines in Ancona by fishing boat with Guy Ruggles-Brise (who later, like him, became a High Sheriff of Essex after the war), John Combe, Dan Ranfurly, American diplomat Walter Orebaugh and an American pilot named Jack Reiter. He was flown to Algiers, from where he and Combe were flown back to England.

== Later life ==
After the war he lived at Threshers in Harlow, serving as High Sheriff of Essex for 1964–65. Later he lived at The Glebe House, Great Bedwyn, Wiltshire, and held the office of Justice of the Peace.

He had married Agnes Swire in 1927. They had one daughter.

== Sources ==
- Playing with Strife, The Autobiography of a Soldier, Lt-Gen. Sir Philip Neame, V.C., K.B.E., C.B., D.S.O., George G Harrap & Co. Ltd, 1947, 353 pages, (written whilst a POW, the best narrative of Vincigliata as Campo PG12, contains a scale plan of Castello di Vincigliata, and photographs taken by the author just after the war)
- Farewell Campo 12, Brigadier James Hargest, C.B.E., D.S.O. M.C., Michael Joseph Ltd, 1945, 184 pages
- Happy Odyssey, Lt-Gen. Sir Carton De Wiart, V.C., K.B.E., C.M.G., D.S.O., Jonathan Cape Ltd, 1950, re-printed by Pen & Sword Books 2007, 287 pages, ISBN 1-84415-539-0
- MI9 Escape & Evasion 1939-45, M.R.D. Foot & J.M Langley, The Bodley Head, 1979, 365 pages
- To War with Whitaker, 1994, The wartime diaries of The Countess of Ranfurly 1939 -1945, Hermione Ranfurly, William Heinemann Ltd, London, 375 pages, ISBN 0-434-00224-0
- War in Italy 1943-1945', 1994, A Brutal Story, Richard Lamb, Saint Martin's Press, New York, 328 pages, ISBN 978-0-312-11093-2
- The Peerage.com
