= Jack Reiter =

United States Air Force colonel

Jack Reiter (3 March 1921 – 29 October 1999) was a United States Air Force colonel, lawyer and businessman.

He was born in New York State, and excelled at sports, winning championships in boxing and swimming. He later attended New York University where he received a law degree.

He had an interest in flying and during World War II Colonel Reiter served as a B-24 Liberator Consolidated B-24 Liberator pilot in the United States Army Air Forces, flying over North Africa and Italy. He was shot down over Foggia in Italy in 1943 and taken prisoner by the Germans. He was sent to an Italian prison hospital as he had dislocated both his thighs on landing.

He later escaped from the hospital before his legs were properly mended when he learned he was being moved to Germany. He had managed to get fairly fit, but his thighs were still partly dislocated. He lived with the partisans (Garibaldi Brigade Romagna under Riccardo Fedel) in the Apennines for some months. He joined up with a group of British officers who had escaped from Castello di Vincigliata prison PG 12 camp during the Italian Armistice in September 1943. They included Brigadier ‘Rudolf’ Vaughan, Lieutenant-Colonel John Combe, Brigadier ‘Ted’ Todhunter, Captain Guy Ruggles-Brise and Lieutenant ‘Dan’ Ranfurly. In March 1944 with the help of Italian guides they walked 250 mile across the mountains to keep a rendezvous with agents on the coast. The travelling was difficult through snow, and the efforts of ‘Rudolph’ Vaughan with his game leg and Jack Reiter with his dislocated thighs became an inspiration to them all.

The eventually reached the coast and after unexpected delays found a fishing boat laid up on the sands. Jack and Dan Ranfurly found a mast whilst others secured a rudder and oars. In May they sailed the leaking boat about seventy miles along the coast just past the front line and were taken in tow by a passing Italian fishing boat into Ortona Harbour. After he returned to the United States, he put his experience to use by training military personnel in escape and survival techniques behind enemy lines.

Colonel Reiter was later posted by the Air Force to Italy and as a senior briefing officer to General Curtis LeMay at Strategic Air Command headquarters. After leaving the Air Force in 1968, Reiter became a member of the Air Force Association and Army Navy Country Club in Arlington, Virginia. He was vice president for government affairs for World Airways and the Washington representative for Flying Tigers International and Japan Airlines. He served as president of the Aero Club of Washington in 1976.

He died at the age of 78 and was survived by his wife Helen N. Reiter and two children, Allan James Reiter and Kathleen N. Ausley.

== Sources ==
- 'To War with Whitaker', (1994), The wartime diaries of The Countess of Ranfurly 1939 -1945, William Heinemann Ltd, London, ISBN 0-434-00224-0
- The Flightglobal Archive: 1972-77, Numerous references to Jack Reiter, World Airways,
- Talon Year book (1956), Student Association of American University, Washington, DC, page 58, photo, John W Davis Senate, Honorary Legal Fraternity of ‘Delta Theta Pi’
