= Riccardo Fedel =

Italian partisan leader (1906-1944)

Riccardo Fedel (23 August 1906 – 12 June 1944), also known by his nom de guerre Libero was an Italian anti-fascist, Communist political fighter, and partisan leader.

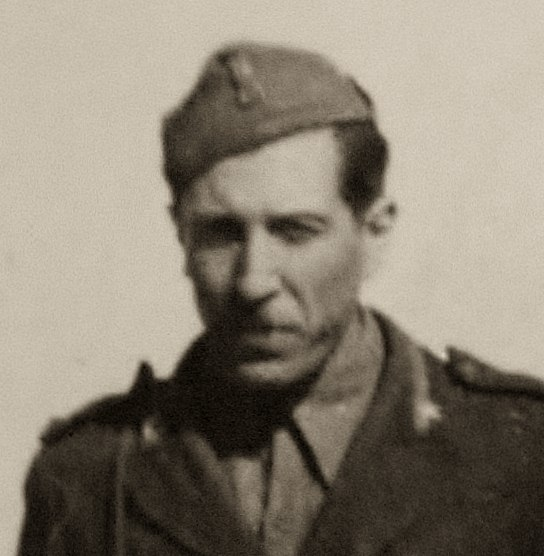
Riccardo Fedel

Born into an aristocratic family on his mother's side, he became a lifelong anti-fascist from an early age. He enlisted in the volunteer Army in 1923 in Modena, becoming a Sergeant. He was discharged in December 1925 following a failed anti-fascist action in Ravenna. His political actions brought him numerous prison sentences. He became the subject of regular government surveillance for over twenty years and earned a police dossier as being a subversive and dangerous communist. After the Italian armistice in September 1943 he became commander of the Garibaldi Brigade Romagna, until his death in April 1944.

== Family and early life ==
Riccardo Giovanni Battista Fedel was born in Gorizia, at that time part of the Austro-Hungarian Empire, on 23 August 1906, in an aristocratic family. His mother was Augusta Bedolo, daughter of a Venetian patriot. Her brother Charles Bedolo was a mining engineer who had emigrated to South America. She married Biagio Fedel, a wine merchant from Istria, with whom she had two children: Riccardo (born 1906) and Anna (born 1908). In 1912, his father Biagio died whilst journeying to Buenos Aires attempting to reach his wife's brother Charles in South America.

As a result, the family's economic conditions worsened progressively, and a year later the family sold all its properties in Istria, Gorizia and moved to Milan. In 1915 during World War I, the family received the status of ethnic Italian refugees from the Austro-Hungarian Empire, and stayed in Milan, where Riccardo completed elementary school and attended the boys technical college in Tortona.

During school holidays Richard visited the villa of Count Gustav Soranzo (an ancient Venetian noble family) in Mestre. The count was his great-uncle from his mother's family, the Bousquet's. It was during one of these holidays that Riccardo at thirteen joined the Italian Fascist movement and remained a member until 1923. However, at seventeen he changed his political views and became a communist, and in 1923 enlisted in the volunteer army. He attended the Military Academy of Modena, becoming a sergeant. He was discharged in December 1925 following a failed anti-fascist action in Ravenna, became the subject of police surveillance and earned a police dossier as being a subversive and dangerous communist.

== Political activity 1920s–1930s ==
He was later arrested by security police for allegedly being involved with handling illegal weapons in Venice harbour, for which he was sentenced to six months in prison. He was then arrested again in October 1926, under the recently introduced laws ‘fascistissime’ (capable of organizing attacks against Benito Mussolini), and sentenced to three years in prison. He was in political exile at Pantelleria from November 1926 to March 1927 and then in Ustica until October 1927, when he was conditionally released on grounds of poor health, and extorted testimony against other fellow prisoners. After prison he returned to the Veneto, where the family lived and was recruited as an agent by the Blackshirts Militia for National Security (MVSN) and sent into service in Gorizia. After a short stay he felt unable to work with the organisation there and after denouncing the leaders of the MVSN he was ‘fired’ and sent back to Mestre. However he continued to pretend to be an agent of the Militia, whilst printing and distributing subversive communist leaflets in Pordenone, calling for a strike of the textile workers. This action triggered a strong reaction by the Chief of Police – a fascist, and he was once again imprisoned for another three years. He was sent to the province of Potenza from 1928 until 1930 and in 1931 to Tremiti, to serve out his sentence. By proxy he married Anita Piovesan, the daughter of an anarchist union leader (and author of 'The Statute of the Bakers' Union') from Mestre, who was allowed to join him in prison until she became pregnant and returned to Venice to give birth. He tried to escape to reach his wife after the birth of the eldest son Luciano, but was caught and sentenced to more than 14 months in prison which he served in Avellino. During his detention, his son Luciano died just a few months old.

Back in Veneto once again he came under political surveillance which he tried to evade (serving another six months imprisonment in Brescia for the falsification of documents). His wife by this stage persuaded him to give up his political activity for the family's sake. A second son had been born in the meantime, named Luciano (after the eldest who had died) and in 1936 they had a third son, George. He took a position with the publisher Edoardo Sonzogno of Milan which allowed him to maintain a family life. In 1939 he was called up for service in the army, and returned with his family to Veneto. In 1940, Italy entered the war against the Allies and he returned to political activity, now more experienced and mature. He was able to facilitate group actives of anti-Fascist propaganda, in factories and barracks, between Mestre, Padua and Treviso. Despite being under surveillance, he was able to avoid arrest. In 1942 he was sent to Montenegro with the 120th Regt. Infantry, Emilia Division. In Herceg Novi, in the Bay of Kotor, he met Arrigo Boldrini, with whom he was to resume political contact later.

== The Italian armistice September 1943 ==
Fedel returned to Italy in 1943, resuming his propaganda campaign and with other like-minded Italian soldiers and helped many to escape deportation. After the armistice was declared on 8 September, he went to Ravenna to get reacquainted with Arrigo Boldini (codenamed Bulow). On 11 September he attended a meeting with other Communist leaders at the Romagna Hotel Mare Pineta di- Milano Marittima. The group included Arrigo Boldrini Mario Gordini, Gino Gatta, Giuseppe D’Alema, Ennio Cervellati, John Fusconi, Agis Samaritans, Rodolfo Salvagiani and Virginio Zoffoli. It was agreed that Riccardo Fedel would be responsible for setting up a partisan group in the Apennines. This was a time of great uncertainty in Italy with numerous political factions working against each other. In addition the presence of the German army in retreat, seeking escaping allied prisoners of war and taking revenge on partisan and civilian groups.

== 1943–1944: Resistance and the Garibaldi Brigade Romagna ==
Between September and October was a period of poor organisation. By November 1943 the group began moving the partisan activity into the Apennines around Faenza with the task of bringing together small and isolated partisan groups in the area. Then Fedel (codenamed Libero) was ordered by the Military Committee of the Communist Party to the west of Galeata to organise the newly formed Brigade Garibaldi Adriatic, linking up with the ‘Savior’ partisan group headed by Salvatore Auria (codenamed Julius). Within a few months of his arrival, the partisan group increased from 40 to more than 1,000 men, with Auria taking on the role of a political commissar.

On 1 December 1943 the Garibaldi Brigade Romagna 8th Brigade Garibaldi "Romagna" was officially established under the leadership of Libero, and by February 1944 the first partisan Republic of Italy had been established known as the ‘Department of Dogwood’. During the winter of 1943/4 this partisan group helped dozens of allied prisoners to escape to allied lines.

Amongst the many they helped were some senior ‘high-profile’ British officers and an Air Marshall who had been imprisoned in Castello di Vincigliata PF 12 near Florence. They included Lieutenant General Sir Philip Neame, General Sir Richard Nugent O'Connor, Lieutenant-Colonel John Frederick Boyce Combe, Brigadier Edward Joseph Todhunter, Air Marshal Owen Tudor Boyd, Major-General Michael Gambier-Parry, Second Lieutenant, Lord (Dan) Ranfurly Daniel Knox, 6th Earl of Ranfurly, Brigadier Douglas Arnold Stirling, and Brigadier Edward William Drummond Vaughan. All were successfully repatriated with the Allies between Christmas 1943 and May 1944.

At the end of March 1944, the Brigade became a division of three brigades: the Romagna Brigade Group, under the command of Hilary Tabarro (Pietro Mauri), with Libero Head of Staff. Then in early April the Fallschirm-Panzer Division 1 Hermann Göring together with departments of CSR began a comprehensive round-up of partisan groups in which they suffered heavy casualties. It was during this period that Riccardo Fedel met his death. After his so-called ‘disappearance’ Hilary Tabarro with the help of Guglielmo Marconi, commander of the Second Brigade, and Bruno Vailati an expert in sabotage, who had been dropped by the Allies, began rebuilding the Brigade.

== Events leading to ‘Libero’s’ death ==
In January, the head of the Military Committee Romagna, Antonio Carini (codenamed Bears) went up into the mountains to check on the situation of the brigade, as the reports seemed inconsistent with the provisions of the FN (Fronte Nazionale). There appears to have been numerous petty disputes amongst themselves over political issues and so called Directives, for example, the arrangement that Libero had agreed to replace the ‘red star’ of the partisans’ caps with a ‘tricolour cockade’. This had to be balanced against giving the Brigade commanders a free-hand. There were also issues about contact with the allies and air-drops. This came to a head in early April, when an order was made for Libero to make contact with a Tuscany partisan group that was eager to form a new brigade. On the 3rd and 5 April there was air-drops by the Allies, previously agreed with Libero in selected areas of the Apennines. The drop it was claimed was to include one or two million pounds sterling. This is where the information becomes confused. The partisan group that was designated to retrieve the money was called back to base – with the effect that Libero was accused of embezzling the money illegally. It was said that to avoid argument he gave it to Guglielmo Marconi, but refused to report to codenamed ‘cloak’. There then appears to have been a German roundup, of some of the Romagna Brigade partisans whilst Libero seemed to have disappeared. A death sentence was handed-down by a partisan court (tried in absentia) against him for desertion and disobedience, attempted misappropriation, attempted insubordination, and illegal communications with the enemy. Judgement was performed by a detachment of the 29th GAP whose members were all subsequently killed by the Nazis. There is much controversy as well as conflicting versions about the circumstances and events surrounding the last few weeks before his death.

In May 1944, Angelo Giovanetti (codenamed the Moor), in a paper to the Military Committee of the province of Ravenna, indicates that ‘Libero is kept isolated in area of Cervia, soon to be subjected to an interrogation, compelling and hard…’. Giovannetti also noted that, ‘the police [Fascist] seeks him and, if he fell into their hands, it would be a serious threat to the organization…’[30]. According to oral testimony, Riccardo Fedel (Libero) was killed by a hail of gunfire in early June 1944. However, the date and place of the killing remains unknown, and his body was never recovered. Riccardo Fedel was officially reported missing, as a soldier.

== SOE Special Operations Executive & MI9 in Italy 1940-1946 ==
During World War II Italy was both an enemy country, and supposedly a monolithic fascist state with no organised opposition which SOE could use, and therefore made little effort in Italy before September 1943, when Mussolini's government collapsed and signed an Armistice with the Allies, who had by this time already occupied Sicily. Amongst the many other clandestine British secret services was a department known as MI9. It worked to train the armed forces in escape and evasion. Evasion lines were set up in occupied countries. Both services together with commando units such as Popski's Private Army attached to the British Eighth Army in Italy trained and supplied the various Italian partisan groups between 1943 and 1945, working later with their American counterparts OSS and MIS-X (US Military Intelligence Service-X, modelled on the British MI9).

Late in 1943, SOE established a base at Bari in Southern Italy, in conjunction with the American OSS (Office of Strategic Services) from which they operated their intelligence networks and agents in the Balkans. In the aftermath of the Italian collapse, SOE helped build a large resistance organisation in the cities of Northern Italy, and in the Alps. Italian partisans harassed German forces in Italy throughout the autumn and winter of 1944. When the German retreat beyond Rome began, instructions were given over SOE Wireless telegraphy (W/T) links and by BBC broadcast signals to the partisan groups in the Apennines to begin their attacks on 16 specified road and rail targets. Most of these assignments were accomplished successfully. One of the original partisan leaders, Arrigo Boldini (codenamed Bulow), who led the XXVIIIth Garibaldi Brigade, was the partisan force which liberated Ravenna, on December 4, 1944, with the approval of the Allied Forces. In the Spring 1945 offensive in Italy, they captured Genoa and other cities unaided by Allied forces.

== Sources and further reading ==
- Playing with Strife, The Autobiography of a Soldier, Lt-Gen. Sir Philip Neame, V.C., K.B.E., C.B., D.S.O., George G Harrap & Co. Ltd, 1947, 353 pages, (written whilst a POW, in Castello di Vincigliata Campo PG12, and his escape in 1943 with the help of Italian partisans and MI9 officers)
- The Last Days of Mussolini, Ray Moseley, Sutton Publishing Ltd, (2006), ISBN 0-7509-4449-8
- War, massacre, and recovery in Central Italy, 1943–1948, Victoria Belco, A History of Contemporary Italy: Society and Politics, Paul Ginsborg,
- War in Italy 1943-1945', (1994), A Brutal Story, Richard Lamb, Saint Martin's Press, New York, 328 pages, ISBN 978-0-312-11093-2
- Special Force: SOE and the Italian Resistance 1943 - 1945, Malcolm Tudor, Emilia Publishing, (2004) ISBN 0-9538964-2-0
- Beyond the Wire: a true story of Allied POW's in Italy 1943–1945, Malcolm Tudor,
- To War with Whitaker, 1994, The wartime diaries of The Countess of Ranfurly 1939 -1945, Hermione Ranfurly, William Heinemann Ltd, London, 375 pages, ISBN 0-434-00224-0
- The War in Italy 1943-1945: true adventures in enemy territory, Malcolm Tudor,
- Prisoners and Partisans: Escape and Evasion in World War II Italy, Malcolm Tudor,
- Mission Accomplished: SOE and Italy 1943–1945, (2011) David Stafford, The Bodley Head, 415pp ISBN 978-1-84792-065-2
- MI9 Escape and Evasion 1939–1945, MRD Foot, & JM Langley, The Bodley Head, London, (1979),
- 200,000 Heroes: Italian Partisans & the American OSS in WWII, Leon Weckstein, L R Publishing, United States, (2011) ISBN 978-1-55571-698-1
- Storia del Comandante Libero. Vita, uccisione e damnatio memoriae del fondatore della Brigata partigiana romagnola, Giorgio Fedel, Fondazione Comandante Libero, Milano, 2013, ISBN 978-88-906018-2-8.
- Edizione critica del Rapporto Tabarri, Nicola Fedel - Rita Piccoli, Fondazione Comandante Libero, Milano, 2014
- Riccardo Fedel Foundation www.riccardofedel.org

== See also ==
- Brigata Garibaldi Romagnola
- Repubblica del Corniolo
- John Frederick Boyce Combe
- 120º Reggimento fanteria "Emilia"
- Arrigo Boldrini
- 28ª Brigata Garibaldi "Mario Gordini"
