= Governor Knox =

Governor Knox may refer to:

- Daniel Knox, 6th Earl of Ranfurly (1914–1988), Governor of the Bahamas from 1953 to 1956
- Uchter Knox, 5th Earl of Ranfurly (1856–1933), Governor of New Zealand from 1897 to 1904
