= Combeforce =

Coordinates: 32°35′52″N 21°28′22″E

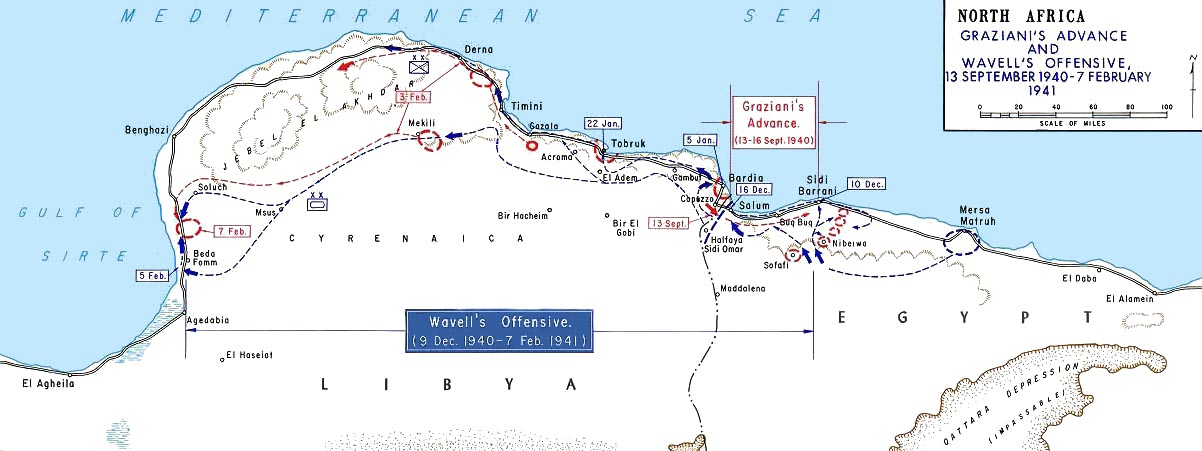
- British pursuit 9 December 1940 – 7 February 1941
- Active: February 1941
- Country: Britain
- Branch: Army
- Role: Flying column

Commanders
- Notable commanders: Lieutenant-Colonel John Combe

Combeforce or Combe Force was an ad hoc flying column of the British Army during the Second World War, commanded by Lieutenant-Colonel John Combe. It comprised parts of the 7th Armoured Division (Major-General Sir Michael O'Moore Creagh) of the Western Desert Force. The rapid British advance during Operation Compass (9 December 1940 – 9 February 1941) forced the Italian 10th Army (10ª Armata) to evacuate Cyrenaica, the eastern province of Libya. In late January, the British learned that the Italians were retreating from Benghazi, along the coast road (the Litoranea Balbo recently renamed the Via Balbia after the death of Italo Balbo, the Governor General of Libya). The 7th Armoured Division was dispatched to intercept the remnants of the 10th Army by moving through the desert, south of the Jebel Akhdar (Green Mountain) via Msus and Antelat, as the 6th Australian Division pursued the Italians along the coast road, north of the Jebel.

The terrain was hard going for the British tanks and Combeforce, with the wheeled vehicles of the 7th Armoured Division, was sent ahead across the chord of the Jebel. Late on 5 February, Combeforce arrived at the Via Balbia south of Benghazi and set up roadblocks near Sidi Saleh, about 30 mi (48 km) south-west of Antelat and 20 mi (32 km) north of Agedabia. The leading elements of the 10th Army arrived thirty minutes later and ran into the British ambush. Next day the Italians attacked to break through the roadblock and continued to attack into 7 February. With British reinforcements arriving and the Australians pressing down the road from Benghazi, the 10th Army surrendered later that day. From Benghazi to Agedabia, the British took 25,000 prisoners, captured 107 tanks and 93 guns. Having succeeded in its objectives, Combeforce was dissolved.

== Background ==
=== Operation Compass ===
In early December 1940, the British Western Desert Force began Operation Compass, a raid against the Italian 10th Army (General Giuseppe Tellera), which had conducted the Italian invasion of Egypt in September. The Italians had advanced to Sidi Barrani and established defensive positions in a line of fortified camps, that were overrun during the raid. Sidi Barrani was captured and the scope of Compass was extended to exploit the victory and the Italian garrisons in Bardia and then Tobruk were isolated and captured. The 10th Army attempted to establish a defensive line at Derna, east of the Jebel Akhdar mountains, with XX Corps (XX Corpo D'Armata di Manovra) (Lieutenant-General Annibale Bergonzoli), comprising the 60th Infantry Division "Sabratha" and the Babini Group, an improvised armoured brigade, which had lost some of its tanks in Tobruk. The Babini Group, had all of the Fiat M13/40 medium tanks in Libya and held the south-west end of the defensive front near Mechili, the junction of several caravan routes, to block another British outflanking move.

=== Derna–Mechili ===
On 22 January, the British advanced towards Derna, with the 19th Australian Brigade (6th Australian Division) and sent another Australian brigade to reinforce the 4th Armoured Brigade of the 7th Armoured Division south of the Jebel Akhdar, for an advance on Mechili. On 23 January, Tellera ordered a counter-attack against the British as they approached Mechili, to avoid an envelopment of XX Corpo D'Armata di Manovra from the south. Communication within the Babini Group was slow because only the tanks of senior commanders had wireless; the other crews were reliant on flag signals limited to "halt", "forward", "backwards", "right", "left", "slow down" and "speed up". Next day, the Babini Group with 10 to 15 M13/40s attacked the 7th Hussars of the 4th Armoured Brigade, which was heading west to cut the Derna–Mechili track north of Mechili. The Italians lost seven M13s by 11:30 a.m., for the loss of one British cruiser and six light tanks.

The 4th Armoured Brigade was ordered to encircle Mechili and cut the western and north-western exits, while the 7th Armoured Brigade cut the road from Mechili to Slonta but found that the Babini Group had already retired into the hills. On 26 January, Graziani ordered Tellera to continue the defence of Derna and to use the Babini Group to stop an advance westwards from Mechili–Derna. During 27 January, a column of Bren Gun Carriers of the 6th Australian Cavalry Regiment was sent south from the vicinity Derna to reconnoitre the area where the Italian tanks had been reported. The Australians was ambushed by part of the Babini Group with concealed anti-tank guns and machine-guns; four Australians were killed and three taken prisoner. The 11th Hussars found a gap at Chaulan, south of Wadi Derna and the Italians disengaged on the night of 28/29 January. Rearguards of the Babini Group cratered roads, planted mines and booby-traps and managed to conduct several skilful ambushes, which slowed the Australian pursuit.

== Prelude ==
=== Pursuit from Mechili ===
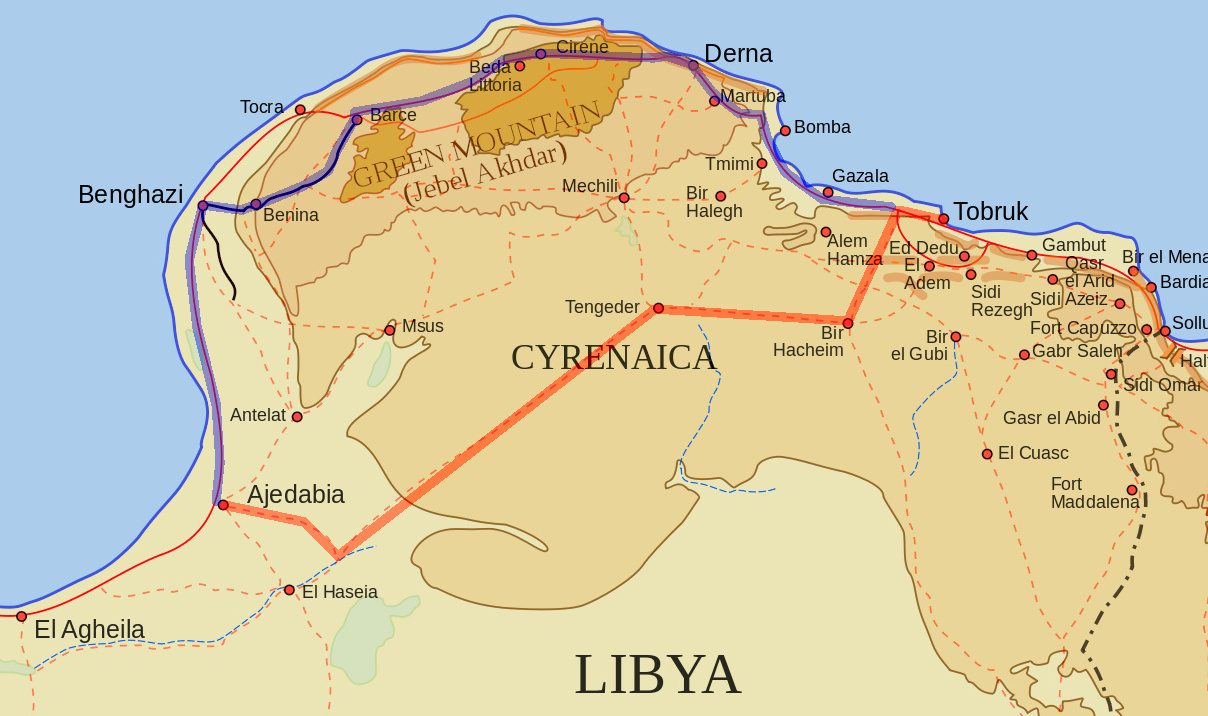
Tobruk–Agedabia, 1940–1941

At dawn on 4 February, the 11th Hussars left Mechili, along a route towards Beda Fomm, which had not been reconnoitred by ground forces to avoid alerting the Italians. The vehicles were loaded to capacity with supplies, fuel and ammunition, the ration of drinking water cut to about a glass a day and halts for food and rest were cut by half. Low-flying air reconnaissance had reported that the going was difficult and for the first 50 mi (80 km) the route was the worst yet encountered. The journey began in high winds and bitter cold and by the time the tail end moved off, the winds had risen to gale force. The head of the column drove into windblown sand which cut visibility to nil, while at the tail, drivers and vehicle commanders standing up reading compasses, were hit by frozen rain. By 3:00 p.m. armoured cars had reached Msus, 94 mi (151 km) away, where the garrison left hurriedly and some cars followed up another 30 mi (48 km) to Antelat.

=== Combeforce ===
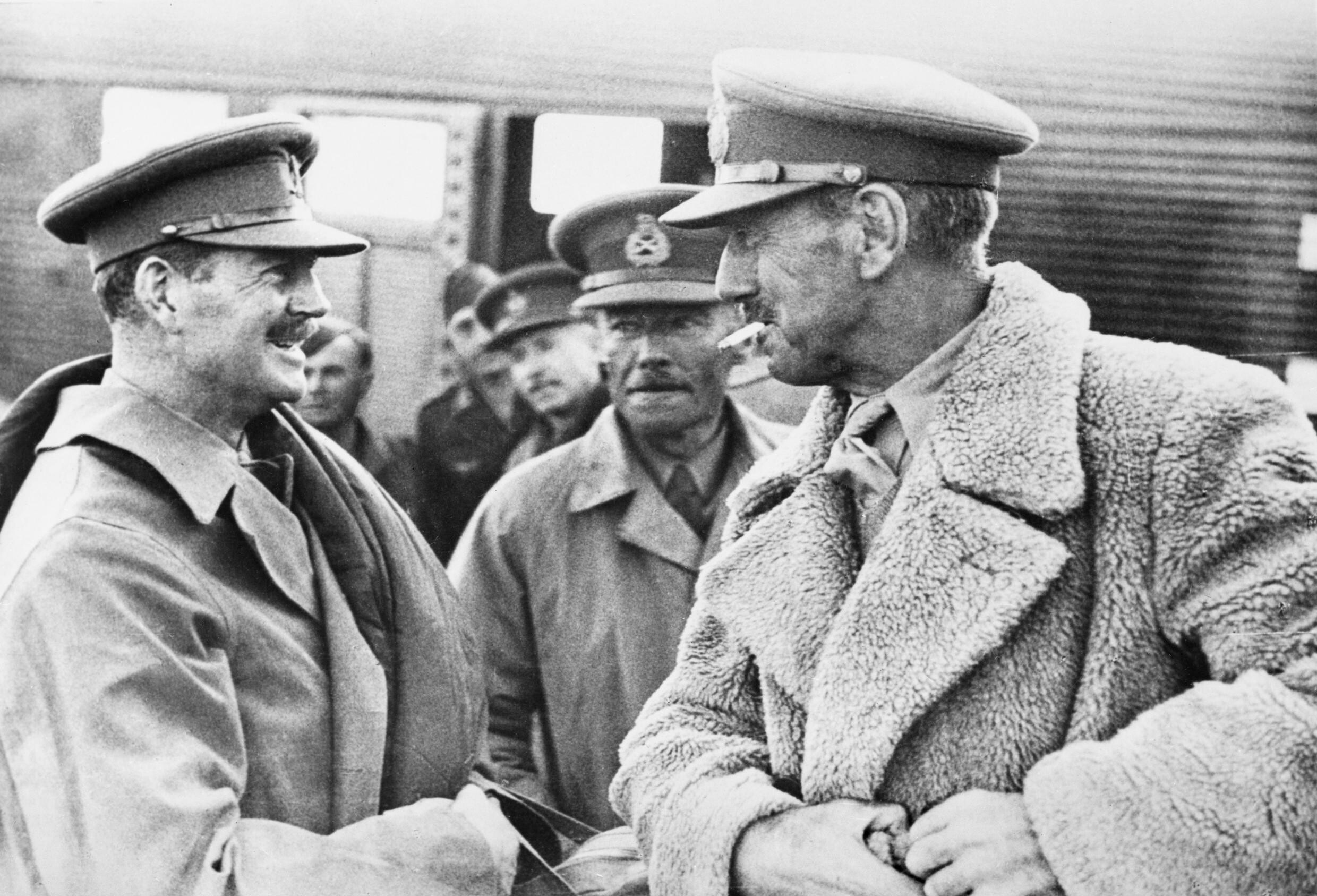
Photograph of Brigadier John Coombe (left) with Lieutenant-General Philip Neame (centre), Lieutenant-General Richard O'Connor (centre, middle distance), Major-General Richard Gambier-Parry (right) following their capture by the Germans, 6 April 1941

By dawn on 5 February, the tracked vehicles and the rest of the 7th Armoured Division had reached Msus. Creagh had been informed by air reconnaissance that the 10th Army was retreating and Richard O'Connor ordered that the advance be pressed to cut off the Italian retreat. Creagh decided to send the wheeled vehicles on ahead, to block the Via Balbia between Benghazi and Agedabia as quickly as possible and to follow on to the south-west with the tracked vehicles, rather than westwards to Soluch. Combeforce (Lieutenant-Colonel John Combe) consisted of an armoured car squadron from each of the 11th Hussars and King's Dragoon Guards, the 2nd Battalion The Rifle Brigade, an RAF armoured car squadron, six 25-pounder field guns of C Battery 4th Royal Horse Artillery (4th RHA) and the 106th (Lancashire Hussars) Battery RHA, with nine Bofors 37 mm anti-tank guns portée (carried on the back of a lorry, capable of being fired), about 2,000 men.

=== Drive for Beda Fomm ===
Combeforce reached Antelat during the morning and by 12:30 p.m. had observers overlooking the Via Balbia west of Beda Fomm and Sidi Saleh, about 30 mi (48 km) south-west of Antelat and 20 mi (32 km) north of Ajedabia, with the rest of Combeforce following on. An Italian convoy drove up about thirty minutes later and ran onto mines; the column was engaged by the British artillery, anti-tank guns and armoured cars, which threw the convoy into confusion. Some members of the 10th Bersaglieri tried to advance down the road and others looked for gaps in the ambush on either side of the road.

== Battle ==
The Bersaglieri had little effect, being unsupported by artillery, most of which was with the rearguard to the north. The attempts by the Italians to break through became more powerful and in the afternoon the 2nd Rifle Brigade crossed the Via Balbia into the dunes, to block the route south between the road and the sea. Combe also brought up a company behind the roadblock, placed some 25-pounders behind the infantry and kept some armoured cars manoeuvring in the desert to the east, to deter an Italian outflanking move. Several hundred prisoners were taken but only a platoon of infantry could be spared to guard them. The vanguard of the Italian retreat had no tanks, contained few front-line infantry and had been trapped by the ambush which forced them to fight where they stood.

While waiting for the 4th Armoured Brigade, Combe reconnoitred to the north and near a small white mosque found several long, low, north-south ridges with folds between, in which tanks could hide from the road as they moved back and forth to fire at close range. The brigade set off from Msus at 7:30 a.m. but the journey was delayed by moving in single-file through a field of Thermos bombs. The brigade took until 4:00 p.m. to cover the 40 mi (64 km) to Antelat, where they came into the range of Combeforce wireless transmissions. Combe briefed Caunter to head for the mosque north of the roadblock and then attack all along the Italian column, to reduce the pressure on Combeforce. Caunter ordered the 7th Hussars and the artillery at full speed to the Via Balbia followed by the 2nd RTR in their slower tanks; the 3rd Hussars were sent north-east to cut the routes from Soluch and Sceleidima. The brigade moved westwards on hard, flat sand, raising clouds of dust and soon reached the Via Balbia.

On 6 February, Combeforce had faced some well-organised attacks with artillery and tank support, which had been repulsed by C Battery RHA and nine Bofors anti-tank guns of the 106th RHA. Italian infantry had used wrecked tanks as cover for their advance, while many more lost hope and surrendered. During the night, some tanks from the Pimple arrived and four were knocked out by mines and gunfire, four got through with some lorries and the rest gave up. The Italians had only about thirty tanks left and planned to force their way through Combeforce at dawn, before the British could attack the flanks and rear of the column.

The attack had artillery support, as soon as it was light enough to see movement by the anti-tank guns portée of the 106th RHA. The infantry of the 2nd Rifle Brigade stayed under cover as they were overrun by the Italian tanks, which concentrated on the RHA anti-tank guns. C Battery 4th RHA fired on the Rifle Brigade positions as the tanks passed and the Rifle Brigade resumed fire on Italian infantry following the tanks to pin them down. The M13s knocked out all but one anti-tank gun and kept going into the reserve company area but the last gun was driven to a flank by the battery commander, his batman and the cook. The improvised crew commenced firing as the last M13s drove towards the Officers' mess tent put up the day before and knocked out the last tank 20 yd (18 m) from the tent. On the road, the Italians could hear British tank engines on the flanks and from the rear and further north, the 4th Armoured Brigade surrounded another group, at which point the Italians surrendered.

== Aftermath ==
=== Subsequent operations ===
At the end of February, the 106th (Lancashire Hussars) Anti-tank Regiment, RHA was chosen to become a Light Anti Aircraft (LAA) regiment of three batteries with thirty-six 20 mm Breda guns captured from the Italians. The regiment was renamed the 106th Light Anti-Aircraft Regiment, RA (Lancashire Hussars). In March 1941, the regiment was sent to Greece in Operation Lustre as part of W Force and the regiment was sent to defend the airstrip at Larissa. The German advance forced the British to retreat to the town of Nauplion, where the 106th LAA regiment were the only anti-aircraft defence. After destroying their Breda guns, the regiment was evacuated to Crete on board HMS Calcutta. Most of the regiment ended the campaign in the defence of Suda Bay in the Battle of Crete and were taken prisoner. The regiment was placed in suspended animation in July and many of the survivors reinforced the 102nd (Northumberland Hussars) Anti-tank Regiment RA, which was refitting after being evacuated from Greece and Crete. The 2nd Battalion The Rifle Brigade fought through the rest of the Western Desert Campaign and took part in the defence of Outpost Snipe from 26 to 27 October 1942 during the Second Battle of El Alamein. Along with the 239th Battery, 76th Anti-Tank Regiment RA and other units, the battalion advanced to a depression near Kidney Ridge, defended it against Axis armoured attacks and spoilt the biggest Axis counter-attack against the ground captured by the Eighth Army during Operation Lightfoot.

== See also ==
- 10th Army
- 7th Armoured Division
- Battle of Beda Fomm
