= John Combe (British Army officer) =

British Army officer before and during the Second World War

Major-General John Combe CB DSO*
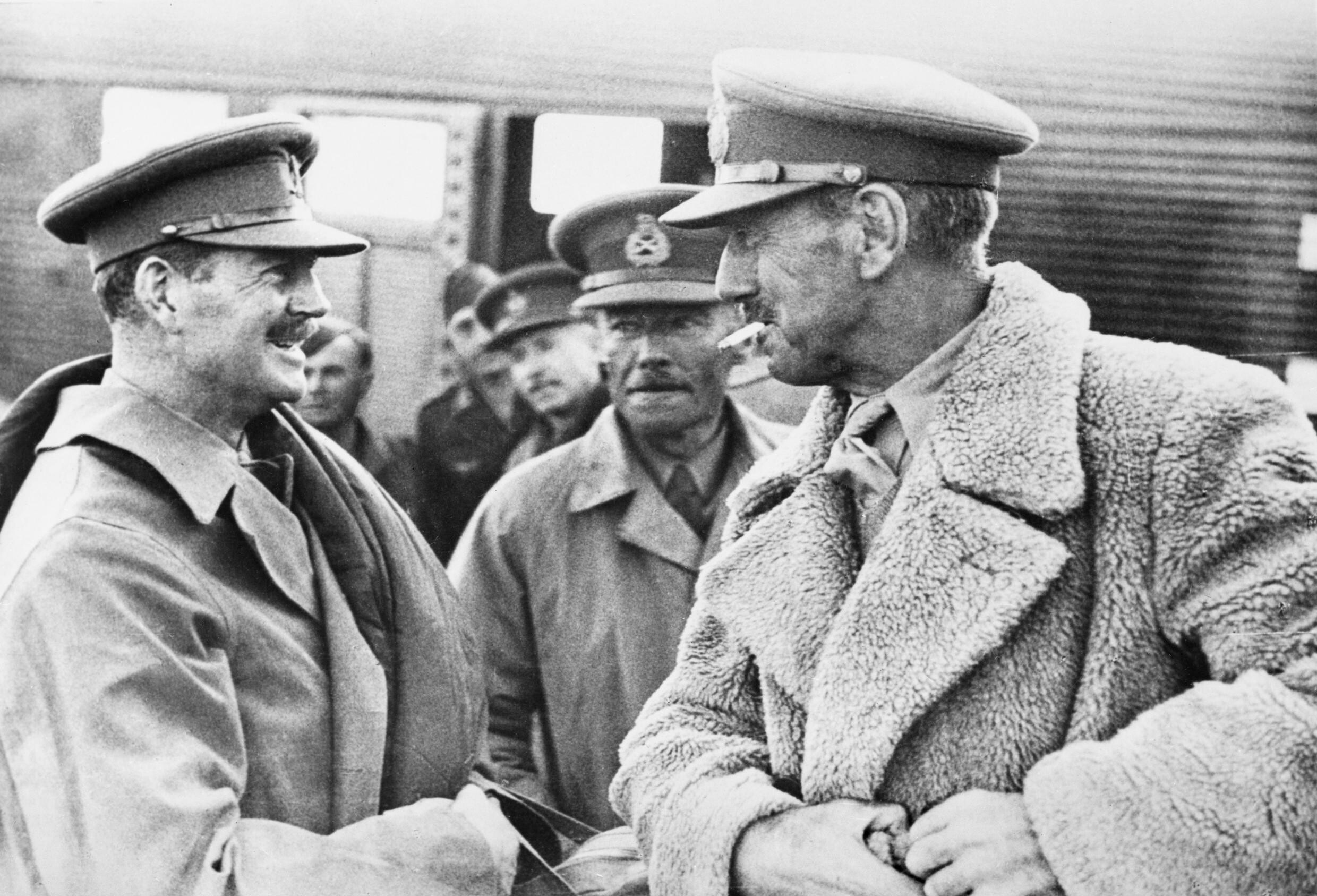
- Brigadier Combe (left) with Lieutenant-General Sir Philip Neame (centre), Lieutenant-General Richard O'Connor (centre, middle distance), and Major-General Michael Gambier-Parry (right) following their capture by the Germans, 6 April 1941
- Born: 1 August 1895
- Died: 12 July 1967 (aged 71)
- Military career
- Allegiance: United Kingdom
- Branch: British Army
- Service years: 1914–1947
- Rank: Major-General
- Service number: 8669
- Commands: British Troops in Austria (1946–1947); 46th Infantry Division (1946); 78th Infantry Division (1945–1946); 2nd Armoured Brigade (1944–1945); Combe Force (1941); 11th Hussars (1939–1941)
- Conflicts: First World War; Second World War: North African campaign; Italian Campaign
- Awards: Companion of the Order of the Bath; Distinguished Service Order & Bar; Mentioned in Despatches; Officer of the Legion of Merit (United States)

Major-General John Frederick Boyce Combe, CB, DSO & Bar (1 August 1895 – 12 July 1967) was a British Army officer before and during the Second World War. He was twice awarded the Distinguished Service Order for his service in the Western Desert campaign before being captured in April 1941 and spending nearly two and a half years as a prisoner of war in Italy. Released in September 1943 when Italy withdrew from the Axis, he made his way back to Allied territory and from October 1944 until the end of the war commanded an armoured brigade.

== Early life ==
John Frederick Boyce Combe was the son of Captain Christian Combe and Jane Seymour (daughter of George Conyngham, 3rd Marquess Conyngham). In 1914, Combe joined B Squadron of the 11th Hussars (Prince Albert's Own).

== Second World War ==
Lieutenant Colonel Combe was the commanding officer of the 11th Hussars for the initial stages of the Western Desert campaign during the Second World War. He had been promoted lieutenant colonel to take command in September 1939, and was partly responsible for the high level of training that prepared the regiment for the battles in North Africa. Under Combe's command, the regiment played a part during the early British raids into Libya and as part of the cover force for the Western Desert Force (WDF) during the Italian invasion of Egypt. The 11th Hussars were part of the divisional troops of the WDF's 7th Armoured Division

=== Combe Force ===
Combe played a major part in the defeat of the Italian Tenth Army during Operation Compass. He was appointed to command an ad hoc mobile flying column known as "Combe Force," comprising a squadron of 11th Hussars, B Squadron 1st King's Dragoon Guards, C Battery Royal Horse Artillery (RHA), some anti-tank guns from 106th Regiment RHA and the 2nd Battalion Rifle Brigade. In February 1941, Combe and "Combe Force" cut off the retreating Italians at Beda Fomm. The Italians were forced to halt and in spite of very determined attempts over two days, were unable to break through Combe Force's defensive lines. Unable to move forward and picked off by attacks from their flank by 4th Armoured Brigade and from the rear by the 7th Support Group, the bulk of the Tenth Army surrendered. Some 25,000 prisoners were taken and more than 100 medium tanks as well as over 100 guns were destroyed or captured.

=== Prisoner of War ===
Combe was promoted to temporary brigadier on 3 April 1941, handing over command of the 11th Hussars to Lieutenant Colonel W. I. Leetham. As a result of Erwin Rommel's advance from El Agheila, he was appointed by the Commander-in-Chief Middle East Command, Archibald Wavell, to accompany another desert-experienced officer, Lieutenant General Richard O'Connor (the former commander of the Western Desert Force which had become the XIII Corps) as adviser to Lieutenant General Sir Philip Neame, the commander of HQ Cyrenaica Command (the successor to XIII Corps). On the night of 6 April 1941, Combe was travelling by car with Neame and O'Connor from their Advanced HQ at Msus to its new location at Tmimi. They were captured by the Germans and taken to mainland Italy to be held as prisoners of war (POW).

Combe was initially sent to the Villa Orsini near Sulmona in the Abruzzo, where he was amongst other distinguished officers, apart from Neame and O'Connor they included, Air Marshal Owen Tudor Boyd, and Major General Adrian Carton de Wiart. He was later transferred to another camp, Castello di Vincigliata PG12 near Florence. He settled into camp life becoming one of the gardeners, as well as keeping sixteen hens, "and tended them like a mother." He was an enthusiastic escaper, taking it turns in tunnelling and one of the six officers to escape in April 1943. He was caught the next morning in Milan railway station, whilst studying a timetable.

=== Partisans in Italy ===
Combe escaped from Vincigliata again with all remaining officers and men during the Italian Armistice in September 1943. He reached Camaldoli with Lieutenant General Sir Philip Neame, Lieutenant General Sir Richard O'Connor and other British officers. In Romagna, he joined the Italian partisans led by Libero the nom de guerre of Riccardo Fedel. During the winter of 1943–44 this partisan group helped Combe and other Allied prisoners to escape. They included Brigadier "Rudolf" Vaughan, Brigadier "Ted" Todhunter, Captain Guy Ruggles-Brise and Lieutenant "Dan" Ranfurly. In March 1944 with the help of Italian guides, they made an astonishing 250-mile (400 km) walk across the mountains in snow, to keep a rendezvous with agents on the coast. The group acquired a leaking fishing boat and eventually arrived at Allied lines in May 1944. Combe, Todhunter and Ranfurly arrived in Algiers on 12 May and were flown to England.

=== Back with Eighth Army ===
After his escape Combe re-joined the Eighth Army. In October 1944 he was given command of the 2nd Armoured Brigade (which he held until after the German surrender) and had his substantive (permanent) rank advanced from lieutenant colonel to colonel.

== Post war ==
After the end of hostilities in Europe, Combe had brief periods as an acting major general. He became the General Officer Commanding (GOC) of the 78th Infantry Division and then the 46th Infantry Division, both based in Austria. In October 1946, his rank of major general was made permanent, and he was appointed Deputy GOC British Troops Austria. He retired from the army in October 1947, but continued to hold the ceremonial post of the 11th Hussar's Colonel of the Regiment, which he had been appointed in July 1945. He held this post for 12 years. It was as Colonel of the Regiment that he took part in King George VI's funeral procession in 1952, positioned behind the coffin. Combe died on 12 July 1967.

== Marriage ==
On 21 July 1947, Combe married Helen Violet Gosling, widow of Major George "Squeaker" Gosling and daughter of Major Lord Percy St. Maur (son of Algernon St. Maur, 14th Duke of Somerset) and Hon. Violet White.

== Footnotes ==
Military offices
Preceded by Stephen Weir	GOC 46th Infantry Division; 1946–1947	Post sisbanded
Honorary titles
Preceded by Sir Archibald Home	Colonel of the 11th Hussars (Prince Albert's Own); 1945–1957	Succeeded by Adam Smail
