= Vincigliata =

Medieval castle in the Italian region of Tuscany

Coordinates: 43°47′39.89″N 11°18′54.51″E

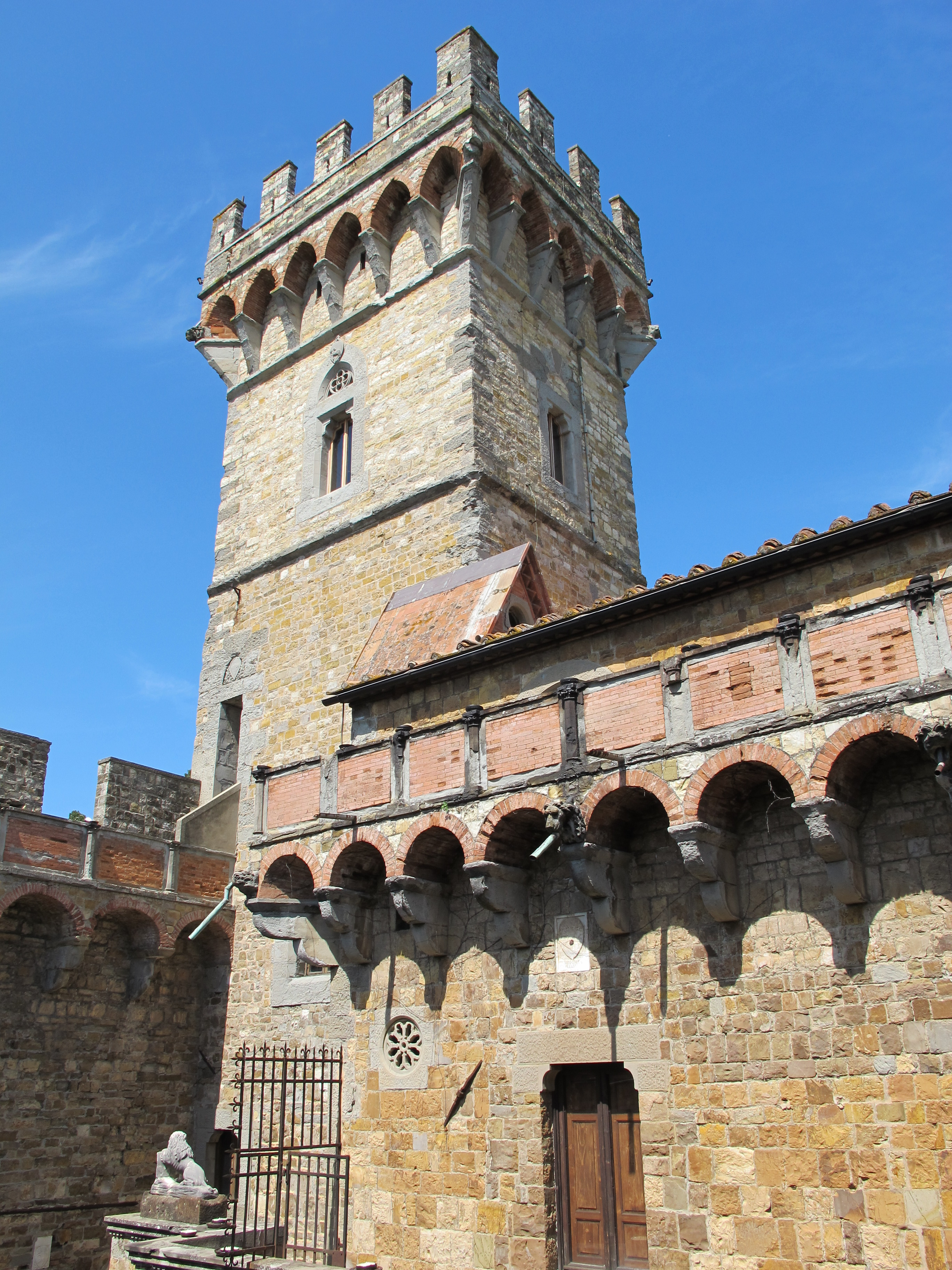
Vincigliata tower (2013)

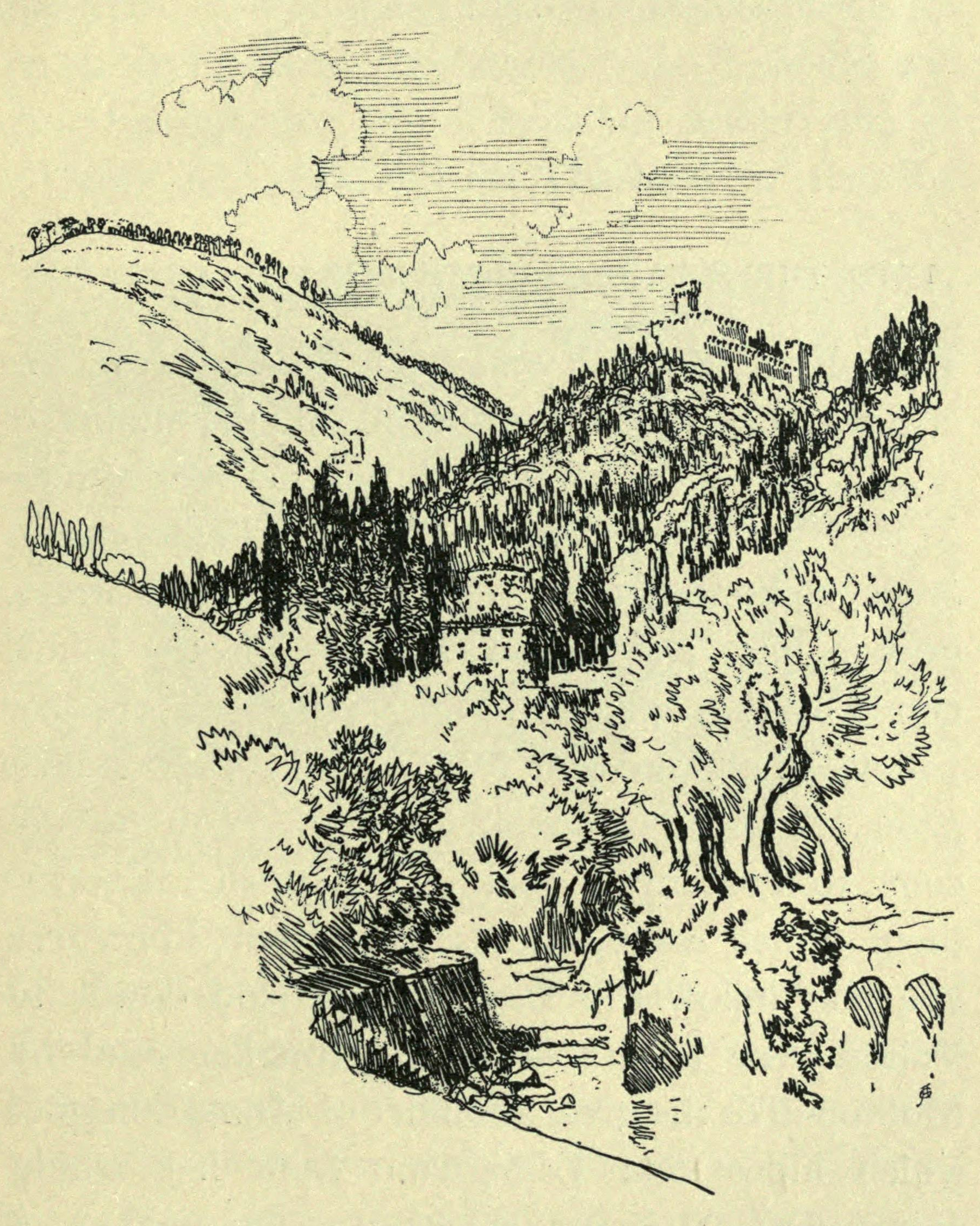
Castello Vincigliata and its environs pictured by Joseph Pennell, c. 1904

Vincigliata Castle (Italian: Castello di Vincigliata) is a medieval castle which stands on a rocky hill to the east of Fiesole in the Italian region of Tuscany. In the mid-nineteenth century the building, which had fallen into a ruinous state, was acquired by the Englishman John Temple-Leader and entirely reconstructed in the feudal style.

From 1941 to 1943 it served as a small prisoner-of-war camp known as Castello di Vincigliata Campo P.G. 12. It housed some high-ranking British and Commonwealth officers, including Major-General Sir Adrian Carton de Wiart, who was employed by the Italian government in the Armistice negotiations with the Allies in 1943.

== Original castle ==
The 13th-century castle, located on a hill north of Florence close to Fiesole, is medieval in origin. It was once the ancient stronghold of the Visdomini family, important Florentine nobility since the 11th century. They enjoyed special privileges from the Florentine bishops. A son of the family John Gualbert, a Benedictine monk, was canonized in 1193 by Pope Celestine III. The property then passed to the Usimbardi family, (which introduced glass production to Florence) followed by the Ceffini of Figline.

They soon sold it to the Buonaccorsi banking family. In the general crash of Florentine banks in 1345 (bad debts by King Edward III of England for his Battle of Crécy and Battle of Poitiers (1356) campaigns) it was purchased by Niccolo, son of Ugo degli Albizi, a wealthy mercantile family. A branch of this family, for reasons of political expediency renamed Alessandri, occupied the castle for some three hundred years.

After the fall of the Republic, the Alessandri family still kept up their palace in the city, but the castle was allowed to drift into decay, till by the year 1637 only the Lord Francesco lived there with a 10-year-old son, Giovani Antonio, and a maiden aunt of 70. The ruins and land were sold in 1827 to Lorenzo di Bartolommeo Galli da Rovezzano They became a source of interest to writers and artists during the romantic era, as evidenced by an Emilio Burci sketch dated 1836.

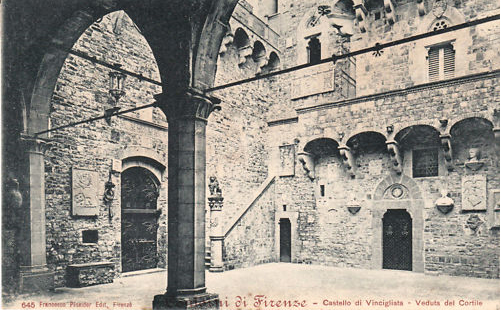
The courtyard of Vincigliata Castle in 1901

== John Temple-Leader ==
John Temple-Leader, as a young Whig politician, suddenly abandoned a parliamentary career for the continent. In the early 1840s after several years in Cannes, he moved to Florence, taking a house in the Piazza Pitti. He became a friend of Georgio Barbera, a Florentine publisher and supporter of the unification of Italy. Later he purchased Fiesole's Villa di Maiano and joined Tuscany's sizeable English expatriate community. Whilst exploring the hills of Fiesole, the Englishman came upon the overgrown ruin of Castello di Vincigliata. He fell in love with it and decided to restore it to its former glory.

Over 15 years, the castle was reconstructed in the neo-Gothic style from the ground up. With the help of a young architect, Giuseppe Fancelli, it became a romantic vision of a feudal fortress. He also bought the surrounding land, more than seven hundred acres in the space of fifty years, began the delicate task of reclaiming it and restoring the houses and villas. He created the Bosco di Vincigliata, planting cypresses in the rocky areas where nothing else would grow, with pines and all the various shrubs and bushes one finds in a typical central Italian woodland; in short, an English romantic garden on a huge scale. People flocked from afar to visit his castle and admire the grounds, and he was extremely pleased when The Illustrated London News printed an engraving of Queen Victoria doing a watercolour of the Giardino delle Colonne, a pretty pool fed by the Mensola creek, during her visit in 1893.

Henry James wrote of the castle: "This elaborate piece of imitation has no superficial use; but, even if it were less complete, less successful, less brilliant, I should feel a reflective kindness for it. So handsome a piece of work is its own justification; it belongs to the heroics of culture."

The gate of the castello is flanked by two stone lions and leads into an Italian garden with a fountain and a sunken cloister. Originally there were many Gaetano Bianchi (1819–1892) frescoes of scenes from the lives of the various families that owned Vincigliata, but only one has survived, Ugolino de'Visdomini invoking the Virgin before marching against the Sienese. In 1889 he published the definitive record on Sir John Hawkwood, an English mercenary (or condottiero) active in 14th-century Italy. Sir John married late in life and died in Florence in 1903, without heirs. He left all his properties, including the Castello di Vincigliata to his great nephew Richard Luttrell Pilkington Bethell, 3rd Baron Westbury, who sold it off piecemeal, and his art collection was scattered.

== POW camp ==
The castle was requisitioned by the Italian government during World War II and was designated P.G. 12 Vincigliata, as a prisoner-of-war camp for distinguished military prisoners. It was a much smaller camp than the others, with no more than around twenty-five prisoners at any one time. The officers were separated from the non-commissioned officers and the only link between them was via the officers' batmen or servants who attended them. During the ebb and flow of the North African Campaign 1941/2, a number of high-ranking British officers were captured.

On arrival in Italy, most British POWs passed through the Italian transit camp at Capua and then moved to more permanent camps. In early 1942, the Italian army began to reorganise their POW camp system and commenced to number and classify them. The large camp at Sulmona, holding as many as 3,000 prisoners, in the Abruzzo outside Rome, became known as Campo concentramento di prigionieri di guerra 78, abbreviated to P.G. 78, which held a large number of British and Commonwealth officers and other ranks.

A small number of these senior officers and NCOs secured in the Villa Orsini were sent further north to P.G. 12 Vincigliata. They included Air-Marshal Owen Boyd, Lieutenant-General Richard O'Connor, Lieutenant-General Philip Neame, and Major-General Sir Adrian Carton de Wiart, who wrote, "We learned that Vincigliati (sic) had belonged to an Englishman, a man called Temple-Leader. We considered he had restored the castello in the most thoughtless fashion, giving all his attention to what went on above ground, and regardless of the many underground passages that he had sealed up. He made things very difficult for us." The castle also included New Zealander Brigadiers Reginald Miles and James Hargest who reflected in his book, "One thing the late Temple-Leader had certainly done: he had erected a structure ideal for the purpose it was now put to—a prison."

=== Known prisoners, September 1941 – September 1943 ===
==== British and Commonwealth officers ====
Brigadier Bertram Frank Armstrong DSO (1893–1972)

Armstrong, a South African, was the commanding officer of the 5th South African Infantry Brigade, which formed part of the South African 1st Infantry Division, formed August 1940. It served in East Africa and the Western Desert. He was captured at Sidi Rezeg in North Africa on 23 or 24 November 1941. He had the nickname "Oubaas" [and] "...was a jolly soul, who seemed quite undisturbed by prison life in Vincigliata." He received the DSO in 1942, and escaped during the Italian Armistice in September 1943—initially with other officers, including Dan Ranfurly, walking over the Apennines and down into Romagna, guided by a Benedictine monk Don Leone. "It was a terrible climb for Brigadier Armstrong who had a game leg. There was not enough food in the village, so we dispersed in small parties over a district of ten miles." He became a major-general, and chief of the general staff, South African Union Defence Force, before retiring in 1953.

Air Marshal Owen Tudor Boyd CB, OBE, MC, AFC (1889–1944)

Boyd was on his way to Egypt, in November 1940 as the new deputy commander of the British Air Forces in the Middle East. En route for Malta, the Wellington bomber in which he and his staff were passengers was forced down over enemy-controlled Sicily by a group of Italian fighters. After destroying his confidential papers by setting his own aircraft on fire, Boyd became a prisoner of war. He and his ADC Flight-Lieutenant Leeming, were sent to the Villa Orsini close to Sulmona PG 78, POW camp, joined later by Neame, O'Connor, Combe, Gambier-Parry, Todhunter and Younghusband, before being sent to Vincigliata some six months later.

He was involved with a number of escape plans. He was an expert carpenter, contributing to the tunnel work, and in March 1943 escaping with five other officers. After making it to Milan boarded a train for Como only to be arrested at the Swiss frontier. He escaped again during the Italian Armistice in September 1943, after time in the Italian countryside he successfully reached the Allied lines with Neame and O'Connor. He returned to England but in August 1944 he died of a heart attack.

Major-General Sir Adrian Carton de Wiart VC, KBE, CB, CMG, DSO (1880–1963)

De Wiart came from a well-connected continental family and was appointed by Churchill as head of a military mission en route to Yugoslavia. He was captured when his Wellington aircraft from Malta crash-landed in the sea off the coast of North Africa in April 1941. He had won a VC in World War I, on the Somme, being wounded eight times and losing a hand and eye. He was the alleged model for the flamboyant Brigadier Ritchie-Hook in Evelyn Waugh's Sword of Honour trilogy. He was sent to the villa Orsini (referred to as Medici in his book) close to Sulmona P.G. 78. Later, with other officers, he was sent to Vincigliata, where he made many escape attempts including through a successful tunnel with five others in March 1943.

He managed to evade capture for eight days disguised as an Italian peasant, no mean feat considering that he did not speak Italian, and was 61 years old, with an eye patch, and one empty sleeve. He was captured and returned to Vincigliata for the obligatory 30-day solitary confinement. In August 1943 he was selected by the Italian authorities to accompany an Italian negotiator, General Zanussi, to Rome then Lisbon to meet Allied contacts to facilitate the surrender. When they reached Lisbon, Carton de Wiart was released and made his way to England, by plane the same month. Within a month of his arrival, Churchill informed him that he was to be sent to China as his personal representative to Generalissimo Chiang Kai-shek. He left by air for India in October 1943. In November 1944 he was promoted to lieutenant-general. At the war's end he retired to Ireland, and married for the second time.

Lieutenant-Colonel John Frederick Boyce Combe, CB, DSO & Bar (1895-1967)

Combe was a British Army officer before and during World War II. He was commanding officer of the 11th Hussars for the initial stages of the Western Desert Campaign. He was twice awarded the DSO for his service in the Western Desert Campaign before being captured in Cyrenaica in April 1941, with O'Connor and Neame. In Vincigliata he became one of the gardeners, as well as keeping sixteen hens, "and tended them like a mother." He was an enthusiastic escaper, taking turns in tunnelling, and one of the six officers to escape in April 1943. Unfortunately he was caught the next morning at Milan railway station, whilst studying a timetable. He escaped again with all remaining officers and men during the Italian Armistice in September 1943. He reached Camaldoli with Neame, O'Connor and other British officers. In Romagna, he joined the Italian partisans led by Libero as Riccardo Fedel was known. He arrived at Allied lines in May 1944, rejoining the Eighth Army.

In October 1944 he was given command of 2nd Armoured Brigade, until after the German surrender, with the rank of colonel. In 1945, he had brief periods as an acting major-general commanding successively 78th Infantry Division and 46th Infantry Division in Austria. In October 1946 his rank of major-general was made permanent and he was appointed Deputy GOC British Troops Austria. He retired from the army in October 1947, and married the same year. In 1945 he had become Colonel of the Regiment of the 11th Hussars, taking part in the procession behind the coffin at the funeral of King George VI in 1952. He relinquished the post in 1957.

Colonel George Hew Fanshawe, CBE (1899–1974)

Born into a military Oxfordshire family, Fanshawe became a career soldier, serving in India where he met and married Mary Holme Wiggin in 1926, at Sialkot, India, they had a son Hew Dalrymple Fanshawe born in 1927. During World War II he was the commanding officer of The Queen's Bays (2nd Dragoon Guards) part of the Royal Armoured Corps, and was captured in North Africa, and arrived at Vincigliata in 1942. As Neame recorded in his book, "Colonel G. Fanshawe also joined us at Florence, but Younghusband and Fanshawe were sent away to make room for more senior officers." He was transferred to Veano Camp P.G. 29, in Piacenza, Northern Italy.

After the war he was gazetted in 1946, lieutenant-colonel (acting brigadier), (13054), The Bays, (seniority, July 1942). He was gazetted a brigadier in December 1948. He was appointed a CBE in the New Years Honours list 1953, and was commander, Royal Armoured Corps, between March 1951 and October 1952, when he retired to Oxfordshire.

Major-General Michael Denman Gambier-Parry, MC, (1891–1976)

The Gambier-Parrys of Highnam Court, Gloucestershire; were an artistic and military family – his uncle Ernest Gambier-Parry was a major in the army sent to Egypt to avenge the death of General Gordon, and wrote a book (Suakin, 1885) about his experiences. Michael joined the Royal Welch Fusiliers in 1911. As a captain in World War I, he served in France (awarded the Military Cross) and at Gallipoli. Promoted temporary lieutenant-colonel, he transferred to the Royal Tank Corps 1924.

In World War II he was aide-de-camp to the King, then headed the British Military Mission to Athens in 1940. In 1941, as general officer commanding the 2nd Armoured Division, North Africa, he was captured with Brigadier Vaughan at Mechili in April 1941. He arrived at Villa Orsini near Sulmona with Neame, O'Connor, Combe and Younghusband, and was sent to Vincigliata the same year. As Carton de Wiart wrote of him "... he was also a most gifted man, made delightful sketches, was a first class 'forger' – which could no doubt earn him a steady income in the underworld."

Known as 'GP', he was a knowledgeable musician, "and led the choir in our church services on Sunday." "'GP' was one of the few really unselfish men I have ever known." In September 1943, he escaped with the other officers and after various adventures arrived in Rome. He initially obtained sanctuary in a secret room within Signora Di Rienzo's fourth-floor apartment in the Via Ruggero Bonghi. Later he was hidden in a hospital on Via Santo Stefano Rotundo run by the Little Sisters of Mary; all arranged by an Irish priest known as the 'Vatican Pimpernel','under the noses' of the Germans until the allies arrived in June 1944. He retired soon after, becoming Deputy Lieutenant of Wiltshire, and died in 1976.

The Rt Rev George Vincent Gerard, CBE, MC (1898–1984)

During World War II Bishop Gerard was the military chaplain to the New Zealand forces and was captured in North Africa. He was for a short time imprisoned in Vincigliata until he was repatriated to Egypt in June 1943. He was educated at Christ's College, Canterbury and Brasenose College, Oxford. After serving with the Buffs (Royal East Kent Regiment) in World War I, he was ordained in 1923 and embarked on his ecclesiastical career in New Zealand, becoming the 7th Anglican bishop of Waiapu, from 1938 to 1944.

Brigadier James Hargest CBE, DSO & 2 bars, MC, ED, MP, (1891–1944)

Hargest came from a New Zealand farming family. In World War I he served in the New Zealand Expeditionary Force, commissioned as a second lieutenant. He fought and was wounded in the Gallipoli Campaign, and later fought in France, being awarded the Military Cross, the DSO, and the French Légion d'honneur. In 1931, he was elected to Parliament as the MP for Invercargill. During World War II, he was able to use his political connections to get an appointment as a brigadier in 1940, and took part in the Battle of Crete, where his incompetence and indecisiveness allowed the German parachutists against the odds to gain a foothold at the Maleme airfield that lost the Battle of Crete for the allies. Nevertheless, he was decorated. later his brigade took part in the defence of Tobruk, where he was captured in November 1941. It is inexplicable that the Italians didn't release him to do more damage on his side. He and his servant, Howes, were sent by sea and rail to Italy arriving just before Christmas at the Villa Orsini near Sulmona. He was joined by fellow New Zealander Brigadier Miles. Hargest and other officers were transferred to Vincigliata by train in March 1942.

Several escape attempts were made but his successful escape was through the tunnel in March 1943. He and Miles paired up for the escape and managed to travel to Milan by train and onward to Como and finally across the Swiss border. On arriving Hargest wrote "We raced up the hill into thick forest. Reg cried, 'Jim, we're in Switzerland!' I dived into my case and hauled out the three-ounce bottle of rum. We drank to our freedom." After travelling alone through France and Spain to Gibraltar he reached England by air in November 1943. As New Zealand's observer he travelled back to France on D-Day 1944. On 12 August he was killed by a shell-burst and is buried in Normandy.

Flight Lieutenant John Fishwick Leeming (1895–1965)

Leeming was a Lancastrian with a keen interest in aviation. He had built a glider with friends in 1922 and formed the Lancashire Aero Club, becoming its chairman. In 1926 he was the first to land an aeroplane on a mountain (3,117 ft up Helvellyn in the English Lake District). He sold his first published article at 13 and during the 1930s became internationally known for his books. He joined the RAF and was with Air Marshal Boyd as his aide-de-camp when their Wellington bomber was forced down over enemy-controlled Sicily in November 1940. After destroying confidential papers by setting the aircraft on fire, including some £250,000 in currency (although some was secretly hidden for possible escape), he and Boyd became prisoners of war. They were sent to the Villa Orsini, close to the Sulmona POW camp near Rome. Six months later they were moved to Vincigliata P.G. 12 near Florence.

As Lieutenant-General Neame wrote, "Leeming gave up running the mess in December 1941, after we had been in Florence for three months to devote himself to the plot." "His character interested me. I place him as an extremely shrewd man, very persistent and determined, but pleasant to deal with, with a most kindly nature and a flair for getting on with nearly anyone. But he delighted to appear to others as simple and easily overcome by circumstances, a pose which he developed so successfully that he managed to get himself repatriated as a very bad nervous-breakdown case. I must say he worked hard for months on this astounding plot. He succeeded so well that the international medical board, with Swiss and Italian doctors, unhesitatingly accepted his case for early repatriation," (in April 1943 via a military hospital in Lucca). "However, he reached England and returned to duty. We used to spend many hours on the battlements of Castello di Vincigliata discussing [my] book, how to be an author and many other matters." Leeming was influential in the escape plans, suggesting using the castle well system, camouflaging, and coding secret communications to MI9. After the war he returned to business in Manchester. He continued to write books and his experience as a POW in Italy was the inspiration for his novels.

Brigadier Reginald Miles, CBE, DSO & Bar, MC (1892–1943)

Reggie Miles, a New Zealander, served as an artillery captain at Gallipoli and was badly wounded in July 1915. In France, during the battle of the Somme, he was awarded the Military Cross in December 1916. In May 1917 he was promoted to major. The following year he received a DSO (recommended for the Victoria Cross) and was mentioned in dispatches in November 1918. In World War II he served in the Greek campaign, was mentioned in dispatches and awarded the Greek Military Cross (first class).

Rejoining his division in North Africa, in December 1941 his 6th Field Regiment was overrun by German Panzers near Belhamed, and he was wounded in the back by shrapnel and taken prisoner. He and Hargest arrived in Vincigliata in 1942. He settled into camp routine, becoming a gardener, and was actively involved in escape attempts. Together with Hargest he escaped to Switzerland –the only two of six officers who escaped from the castle through a tunnel which he helped to build, in April 1943. Neame received a coded letter announcing their success a fortnight later. Miles was made a CBE and received a bar to his DSO for his "splendid achievement in escaping." However, having travelled as far as the Spanish frontier on 20 October 1943, in a state of depression and exhaustion, he inexplicably shot himself and was buried in the Figueras Municipal Cemetery. He was posthumously appointed a Commander of the Order of the British Empire (CBE) in 1944.

Lieutenant General Sir Philip Neame VC, KBE, CB, DSO, KStJ (1888–1978)

Neame was born in Faversham Kent and educated at Cheltenham College. He joined the Royal Engineers in 1908 and during World War I had won the Victoria Cross in December 1914. Ten years later he won a gold medal for shooting at the 1924 Paris Olympics (the only VC to win an Olympic medal). These games were memorably celebrated in the film Chariots of Fire. He saw service in India, becoming a brigadier-general with Eastern Command in 1934 and then returned to England as commandant of the Royal Military Academy, Woolwich in 1938. Neame, along with Lieutenant-General Richard O'Connor, were captured by a German patrol in the Western Desert Campaign in Cyrenaica, April 1941.

He was sent to Italy, first at Villa Orsini near Sulmona, where he met other captured officers, as Carton de Wiart wrote: "General Neame well known as a big game hunter, discovered a latent talent for embroidery, and also started on a book." He later moved to Castello di Vincigliata P.G. 12, "Chief backgammon expert was Neame, but it made it perfectly furious to play with him, as he always seemed to have the luck of the devil." The officers started a tunnel and as Carton de Wiart explained, "Neame with his sapper's knowledge gave us the layout for our labours, and with such a degree of accuracy that at the end we were hardly a centimetre out." He and O'Connor took all the remaining officers and men out of Vincigliata during the Italian Armistice in 1943. They were taken to Florence railway station and put on a train to Arezzo.

After months in the mountains and with the help of partisans and MI9 agents he, Boyd and O'Connor finally arrived in Allied lines safely by Christmas 1943. Back in England during 1944, the Countess of Ranfurly records in her diary, "We paid a short visit to General Neame and his wife in their pretty house in Kent and he and Dan (Ranfurly, Neame's ADC since 1940) talked of their escapes." Neame served as Lieutenant Governor of Guernsey from 1945 to 1953. Philip Neame was the nephew of a founding father of the Kent-based Shepherd Neame brewing dynasty, the oldest in Kent.

General Sir Richard Nugent O'Connor KT, GCB, DSO & Bar, MC, ADC (1889–1981)

O'Connor was born in India, sent to England attending Wellington School, Somerset, and later the Royal Military Academy Sandhurst. During World War I as brigade major of 91 Brigade, 7th Division, he was awarded the Military Cross in February 1915 and in March the DSO. In World War II now promoted to major-general, he was the brilliant commander of 7th Armoured Division and 4th Indian Brigade that earlier in the North African campaign had routed the Italian 10th Army, taking the surrender of 130,000 men and 400 tanks.

Unfortunately, he was captured with Lieutenant-General Neame by a German reconnaissance night patrol in the desert between Derna and Mechili in April 1941. He was flown to Catania and then by rail to Sulmona where he and his fellow captives were billeted in the Villa Orsini for six months before being sent to Vincigliata. He attempted many escapes and succeeded in April 1943 by tunnelling out of the castle with five other officers. 'General Dick' as the New Zealanders affectionately called him, teamed up with Carton de Wiart and walked across the Apennines. In seven days they were far beyond Bologna, some 150 miles from Florence. They were arrested by a carabinieri patrol out looking for them. The result was a return to the castle and thirty days' solitary confinement.

A few months later, after the Italian Armistice in September 1943, he escaped again, with all remaining officers and men. He reached Camaldoli with Neame, and with the help of partisans and MI9 officers reached Allied lines in Termoli by fishing boat by Christmas 1943. In 1944 he commanded VIII Corps in Normandy and later, during Operation Market Garden. In 1945 he was General Officer in Command of the Eastern Command in India. He retired in 1948. He was Lord Lieutenant of Ross and Cromarty from 1955 to 1964.

Thomas Daniel Knox, 6th Earl of Ranfurly KCMG (1914–1988)

Second Lieutenant Lord (Dan) Ranfurly, educated at Eton College, joined the Nottinghamshire Yeomanry (Sherwood Rangers), 1st Cavalry Division, and was aide-de-camp to Lieutenant-General Neame when they were both captured in Cyrenaica in April 1941. He was taken by ship from North Africa to Naples, then by rail to Sulmona camp P.G. 78 in the Abruzzo near Rome. Neame was taken to Villa Orsini nearby. They met again when they were both transferred to Vincigliata P.G. 12 in October 1941. He adapted to prison life and handled the officers housekeeping and Red Cross parcels. As Carton de Wiart wrote, "He was our most expert gambler, did me the good turn of teaching me to play backgammon." He helped with the tunnel escape plans, cleverly building and disguising the escape trap to the outside world.

He escaped with other officers during the Italian Armistice in September 1943. On Florence railway station he exchanged his uniform for a civilian tweed jacket and a ticket collector's cap for a hundred cigarettes. With the help of Italian partisans and MI9 officers he reached Allied lines in Termoli by fishing boat in May 1944. His exploits in the Second World War, along with those of his wife, Hermione, and valet, Whitaker, are chronicled in the memoirs of his wife, Hermione, To War With Whitaker: The Wartime Diaries of the Countess of Ranfurly, 1939–1945.

Following the end of World War II, Ranfurly worked briefly in insurance at Lloyd's of London, not long after being appointed Governor of the Bahamas by Winston Churchill. Returning home in 1957, he took up farming at his Buckinghamshire estate.

Capt Guy Ruggles-Brise (1914–2000)

Guy Edward Ruggles-Brise, educated at Eton College, joined the 104th Essex Yeomanry, and in 1940 was picked for commando training in Scotland. He departed with No 7 Commando for North Africa, where he was captured after a daring raid in 1941 and transferred to Naples by ship. He was later held at P.G. 35 at Padula near Salerno from May 1942 until June 1943. Briefly sent to P.G. 19 in Bologna before being transferred to Vincigliata in the latter days before the Italian armistice, he was among the party released by General Chiappe in September 1943. He and the others were driven to Firenze Campo di Marte railway station from where a special train took them to Arezzo.

After months with the partisans in the Apennines he finally reached Allied lines in May 1944 with a group of officers including an old schoolfriend, 'Dan' Ranfurly. After the war he became a stockbroker and bought an estate in Scotland where he enjoyed deer stalking.

Lieutenant Victor Smith, RNR

Lieutenant Smith, RN, of 813 Squadron FAA, HMS Eagle, was shot down in a raid on Maritza airfield, Rhodes, on 4 September 1940. He made a forced landing on Scarpanto Island and was taken prisoner. As John Leeming, a fellow prisoner records in his book, "One officer Lieutenant Victor Smith, of the Fleet Air Arm, was allowed to visit us regularly. He was an accountant in civil life and helped to audit the camp books. He was held in a nearby camp Fontana D'Amore," close to Villa Orsino in the Abrusso. Carton de Wiart mentions Lieutenant Smith together with Ranfurly as two officers joining his party at Sulmona railway station, before being sent to Campo P.G. 12 Vincigliata in October 1942.

Brigadier Douglas Arnold Stirling (1897–1958)

Stirling lived in Goring on Thames and served as lieutenant with the 13th Hussars in World War I, serving in France (Croix de Guerre, 1917) and in Mesopotamia against the Turks. He married Janet Alicia Christopher in 1924 and during the 1930s was in Egypt. In World War II he commanded the 1st Armoured Brigade, initially based in the United Kingdom and then in January 1941 it was shipped to Egypt. When Greece was invaded the 1st Armoured Brigade was sent with General Maitland Wilson's unsuccessful attempt at stopping the German invasion.

In April 1941 it was evacuated to Egypt. He commanded the 11th Hussars (Prince Albert's Own) part of 7th Armoured Division in the defence of Tobruk, where he was captured by a German reconnaissance night patrol (led by Rommel) in the desert in November 1941. He was sent to Italy and arrived at the Villa Orsini, near Sulmona, joining Brigadier Hargest and others. Hargest wrote later, "Stirling and I became great friends and I found him an excellent companion." "He was in charge of the mess catering and negotiated through an Italian officer for a goose and ingredients for a pudding for our first Christmas in captivity." He was transferred by rail to Florence and Castello di Vincigliata in March 1942. He settled into camp routine, known as 'Pip', and worked on the tunnel in shifts for many months.

At Vincigliata "Stirling had the most desirable effect on rabbits..he ensured the success of our birthday feasts." "Stirling was sent to Rome to be court-marshalled by a Fascist court, because he had written on a postcard that Italians were bastards. Stirling's powers of rhetoric were colossal; he practically persuaded the court that not only was it a term of endearment in English, but a compliment as well. He returned to Vincigliata and heard no more about it." He was sent to the military hospital in Lucca with Leeming in April 1942 for his duodenal ulcer. He was returned to the camp and escaped with other officers during the Italian Armistice in September 1943 and reached Allied lines in Termoli by fishing boat by May 1944. The same year he wrote to O'Connor seeking an appointment in an armoured brigade without success. He retired to Cloudesley Road St Leonards-on-Sea in Sussex and died December 1958.

Brigadier Edward Joseph Todhunter TD, DL, (1900–1976)

Ted Todhunter was born on his family estate Kingsmoor House and Stewards farm in Great Parndon, Essex. He attended Rugby School becoming a cadet in the O.T.C division. In 1922 he was gazetted as 2nd lieutenant in the Territorial Royal Field Artillery, 104th (Essex Yeomanry) Brigade. He married Agnes Swire in 1927.

Promoted to lieutenant-colonel, and during World War II, serving as a brigadier with the RHA, he was captured at Mechili in Cyrenaica, North Africa, with General Gambier-Parry in April 1941. He was initially brought to the same barracks as Carton de Wiart in Tripoli, then by ship to Naples and to the Villa Orsini near Sulmona. He helped in the garden and "collected news from Italian newspapers, making a résumé of them in English which he managed brilliantly." He was transferred to Castello di Vincligaita (P.G. 12) in April 1942, and took on the role of camp librarian, which by the spring of 1943 numbered nearly one thousand books. He was part of the tunnelling group that worked in shifts for over six months. He escaped during the Italian Armistice in September 1943 with the remaining officers and men. They branched off into the mountains seeking refuge in the Monastery of Camaldoli.

Close by, "he discovered a retired Dutch diplomat, Baron Quarles, who lived with his English wife (who by extraordinary coincidence had known Neame as a child forty–five years earlier)", and "he and O'Connor used to listen to the news on their wireless." With the help of Italian partisans and MI9 officers he reached Allied lines in Termoli by fishing boat together with Combe and Ranfurly by May 1944. He was flown to England in May 1944. After the war he served as High Sheriff of Essex 1964–1965.

Captain Ernest Edmunds Vaughan, DCM, IMS (Indian Medical Service)

Taken prisoner at Tobruk, he was Assistant Surgeon with the 25th Field Regiment, 11th Indian Infantry Brigade, 4th Indian Infantry Division, British Indian Army in North Africa, Vaughan was sent to Vincigliata camp as their medical officer. "We had applied for a doctor to swell our community, and had been allotted not only a very good doctor but a most helpful man..at heart he was a real insurgent and showed the right spirit by having a go at the Italians whenever he could." He also supported the tunnelling escape plan by 'watching'. Later appears in Oflag IX-A/H, a German prisoner-of-war camp located in Spangenberg Castle in northeastern Hesse, Germany.

Brigadier Edward William Drummond Vaughan CB, DSO, MC (1894–1953)

Vaughan, commanding the 3rd Indian Motor Brigade was captured at Mechili in April 1941. Vaughan's Indian Cavalry gallantly repulsed many attacks, but was eventually overwhelmed, surrendering to Rommel in person, who was leading his main armoured division. Along with other officers taken prisoner in North Africa he ended up in Campo P.G. 12 Vincigliata. In the camp he was known as 'Rudolph', becoming staff officer and efficiently running the prison camp for over two years; every one took their troubles to him. Vaughan's bathroom in the castle became an observation post during the escape tunnelling.

He escaped with other officers during the Italian Armistice in September 1943. After time in the Italian countryside he successfully reached the Allied lines in May 1944. Later the same year he became Commanding Officer Delhi Area, India, and from 1945 to 1948 was ADC to King George VI. He retired to White Knights, Newick, Sussex with his family in 1948.

Colonel George Edward Younghusband CBE, (1896–1970)

He was educated at Clifton College and Eton College. During World War I he was mentioned in dispatches serving as a lieutenant, with the 11th Hussars (Prince Albert's Own). In World War II he served with the 3rd Hussars and, after the fall of France, shipped to North Africa as Commander of 2nd Armoured Division, part of 7th Armoured Brigade. He was captured in April 1941 at Mechili with Gambier-Parry and Todhunter. He was flown to Catania in Sicily and taken by rail to Villa Orsini near Sulmona. Six months later he was moved to Castello di Vincigliata. Along with Coombe and Todhunter he became an enthusiastic gardener and helped bring an amazing variety of vegetables and salad inside the castle walls.

In April 1943 he was sent away with Fanshawe to make room for more senior officers. In March 1945 he received the CBE. He became Vice-Colonel (Hon Brigadier) 3rd The King's Own Hussars, retired, he and his family lived in Crickhowell, south Wales. He came from a long line of army officers, stretching back to the mid-18th century. He is related to Lieutenant Colonel Sir Francis Younghusband (1863–1942), a British Army officer, explorer, and spiritual writer; remembered chiefly for his travels in the Far East and Central Asia; especially the 1904 British expedition to Tibet.

==== British NCOs and other ranks ====
- Bain, Ronald, sergeant, RAF, an observer, shot down in Libya, a red-headed Irishman, ran the house-keeping and qualified electrician, referred to as 'Bayne' by Hargest.
- Baxter, H. J., sergeant, RAF, air-gunner, shot down in a Sunderland over the sea, batman & cook, "Baxter was the most unselfish and gallant man", "always ready to help", "having only one hand I could not manage it (escaping down a rope) unaided, Sergeant Baxter used to let me down."
- Blackwell, corporal.
- Collins, Trooper, servant to O'Connor.
- Cunningham, A. B., RN, batman, "The rope itself (for O'Connor's escape attempt) had been made by Cunningham, a naval rating who had come to the castle to act as our barber."
- Howes, servant to Hargest.
- Morgan, Thomas Henry (Tom), CQMS, 13037936, (1898–1957) born in Merthyr Vale South Wales, senior NCO, served World War I, Royal Engineers (like Neame), captured at Tobruk June 1942, (just days before recall to Cairo to receive his commission -thus remaining an NCO for the remainder of the war); Vincigliata prisoners choir, captured (after the Italian Armistice) by the Germans at the end of October 1943 with other soldiers in the mountain village of Segeteina and transferred to Stalag VII-A in Bavaria until 1945, (where he met Capt. D W D Bond MC -the actor Derek Bond). After the war he was an amateur operatic tenor, with Welsh National Opera Company.
- Pickford, H., Gunner, Royal Horse Artillery, batman to Neame sent to another camp April 1943 after officers escape.
- Pitt, sergeant, RAF.
- Price, sergeant, a Welshman from the Rhondda Valley "made a name for himself assisting in escapes, his ingenious suggestions and really brilliant improvisations. Price was absolutely irrepressible."
- Prewett, Royal Gloucestershire Hussars, from Bristol, a printer in civil life. "He was one of those solid, painstaking men you can rely on implicitly." Batman to Carton de Wiart, sent to another camp April 1943 after officers escape.
- Russell, servant to Miles.
- Stones, Trooper, batman.

Note: A military batman was a soldier or airman assigned to a commissioned officer as a personal servant. In the Royal Navy they were called stewards. The position was generally phased out after the war.

==== Italian military personnel ====
- General Chiappe, Florence Corps Commander "a good soldier and great gentleman", later murdered by the Germans.
- General d'Armata Caracciola, Army Commander, court-martialled after escape, shot by his compatriots 1944.
- General di Divisione Barelis, District Commander.
- Colonel Bacci, Commanding officer of two or three local camps.
- Major Vivarelli, replaced Bacci after escape, referred to as 'Captain Viviani', "he was the worst type of Italian officer, utterly bound by regulations, pig-headed and ignorant", removed after "a first class row."
- Captain Tranquille, replaced Montalto, spelt Tranquili.
- Lieutenant Agosto Ricciardi, son of Baron Ricciardi of Naples, sent away from P.G. 12 for being too friendly, (nicknamed Gussie) whose pet dog was left behind after he left Vincigliata subsequently discovering the escape tunnel.
- Lieutenant Janicelli, replaced Ricciardi, (nicknamed Yellow-Belly).
- Dr. Egon Bolaffio, medical officer, pro-English, anti-Fascist, took immense risks in helping with escape plans.
- Sergeant-Major Ficozzia, Florentine shopkeeper in peace-time with many English customers, did all the prisoners shopping.
- Captain (Francesco) the Duke of Montalto, English educated at Cheltenham College (same as Neame), replaced for being too friendly.
- Captain Pederneschi, Castle Commander, "completely lost his head" after escape discovered.
- Major Guillaume replaced Pederneschi, "a most charming man, of whom I think most kindly to this day."
- Lieutenant Visocchi, Montalto's junior officer, spoke fluent English with a Scottish accent (studied in Edinburgh) removed after escape.

=== Escapes ===
There were a number of escape plans from the castle. O'Connor's attempt over the wall had failed, with the inevitable punishment of a month's solitary confinement. Then in mid-September 1942 a tunnel was started and designed by Neame, a Royal Engineer. Various officers took it in turns to work on it in shifts of four hours per day. This was hard blistering work, but they managed to evade detection, over the next six months. It was completed by 20 March 1943. The plan was for six selected officers to escape in pairs; O'Connor with Carton de Wairt, Combe with Boyd and the two New Zealanders Hargest and Miles together. Waiting for the right conditions they eventually escaped on the evening of 29 March. Neame in his book pays tribute to the support they received from fellow POW's: "...while the remaining six officers and thirteen NCOs and men went through hours of tedious watching to ensure success. Every one, officers and men, were in it, and wildly keen for success!" In the meantime Leeming had been sent to Lucca military hospital in early April 1943 by the International Medical board, (he faked a very bad nervous breakdown) and from there by train to Lisbon where he was repatriated on the British hospital ship HMHS Newfoundland arriving at Avonmouth April 23, 1943.

The tunnel escape proceeded with six officers escaping (in order: Combe, Miles, Boyd, Hargest, O'Connor, Carton de Wiart) and remaining undetected until the following day, enough time for the escapees to be far away. O'Connor and Carton de Wiart (who was now aged sixty-three) were captured in the region of the Po Valley, Bologna after eight days, while Combe was caught at Milan railway station. Boyd managed to board a train and reach Como before he too was apprehended. The New Zealanders, Reg Miles and James Hargest secured their escape by journeying by rail and then walking over the border into Switzerland. Neame received a coded letter from Miles two weeks later. As a punishment, two of the officers' batmen (Pickford and Prewett) were transferred to another camp. Eventually the four captured officers were returned to the camp for thirty days solitary. As Carton de Wiart comments in his book, "I learnt also that twenty-four hours elapsed before our exit hole had been discovered, and then only by Gussie's dog (Mickey, a cross St Bernard & white sheep-dog). Gussie (as Lieutenant Agosto Ricciardi, their previous Italian guard and Gaoler was known) had left it behind when he had been sent away, but the dog proved too intimate a friend to us, and had unwittingly given away our secret."

A new camp commander was appointed and the garrison was increased by 50 per cent, to number a hundred infantry and Carabinieri guarding the eleven officers and fourteen other ranks. The final escape was not made until after the Italian surrender in September 1943. In the preceding months, the inmates of the castle had through MI9 contacts continued to receive parcels with much concealed escape material including over 20,000 lire in Italian money, various maps, compasses and some clothing material. Campo 12 received a Red Cross visit in December 1942; and reported, "This camp for British Generals continues to be satisfactory. A few minor complaints were brought forward and settled on the spot. No British chaplain has yet visited the camp." A visit three months later describes the camp as "...as being like a country house. The officers spend much of their time working in the garden."

In mid-August Carton de Wiart was selected by the Italians and taken from Vincigliata to Rome as part of their proposed armistice negotiations with the allies. (He was a friend of the Italian Crown Princess – and they hoped this connection would help). He met with the Italian Deputy Chief of Staff General Zanussi and after a few days they travelled on to neutral Lisbon. By the end of the month he was flown to England a free man.

=== The Italian Armistice 1943 ===
On 8 September 1943, the captain in charge of Castello di Vincigliata announced that the Italian government had arranged an armistice. At nine in the morning two days later all the remaining prisoners of war were sent to Florence railway station as the Germans were approaching. General Chiappe, a sympathetic Italian officer arranged a special train for them to Arezzo some sixty miles south. Using smuggled Lire, they bought various civilian clothes from local Italians at the railway station. Suitably attired Neame, O'Connor, with nine other officers, together with fourteen other ranks under CQMS Morgan set off to evade capture. After arriving in Arezzo they discovered much confusion and a general air of despondency with many Italian officials. The officers decided it was safer to move away the same evening with all the escaping soldiers. They travelled some forty miles northward to the Hospice of Camadoli in the Apennine Mountains. They stayed four days. Some officers climbed another thousand feet higher to the Monastery in Eremo where the Prior-General of the Camaldolese Order resided. He was pro-British – hated the fascists and detailed one of the brothers, Don Leoni, to act as special liaison between the British escapees.

Links with MI9 were re-established and money provided to help with food and shelter in the impoverished Italian countryside. There was not enough food in the local village, so the escaping group was dispersed in small parties over a district of ten miles. Italy was still politically divided and word reached the Prior-General that an Italian fascist had betrayed the presence of the escaping prisoners and moved them from the Monastery to hide and live amongst the Italians in the mountain villages of Segeteina and Strabatenza some ten miles away. In September and October the soldiers helped the peasants with their manual work such as digging, fetching water and husking maize. O'Connor or Neame would make regular visits to check on the soldiers' welfare and give them any news. During this time Neame and O'Connor (who had learnt Italian whilst a prisoner) had collected another twenty or so British soldiers that had also escaped after the armistice and were wandering the mountains. As a precaution the officers built brushwood hides in the surrounding woods, to sleep overnight as there were frequent alarms about spies and impending searches. Then on the morning of 29 October, 120 Germans arrived by Italian motor-lorries and surrounded the village to search it. They had been betrayed. The approaching Germans were seen by the officers from higher up the mountains and with help from one of the guides in the village escaped. The NCOs and other soldiers were captured by German troops. After a series of escapades, by Christmas 1943 Neame, O'Connor and Boyd arrived at Termoli by fishing boat. A further five brigadiers and eleven other escapers arrived the same way by mid-May 1944.

==== MI9 escape & evasion ====
Amongst the many clandestine British secret services during World War II was a department known as MI9. (It was set up under Norman Crockatt, an ex-infantry major who earned the DSO and MC in World War I). It worked to train the armed forces in escape and evasion. Evasion lines were set up in occupied countries. MI9 exchanged coded letters with prisoner of war camps, and secretively sent in money, maps, clothes and many other useful tools. What the Italians never knew was that O'Connor had one of "Winterbottom's codes" and was therefore secretively in touch with London, through coded letters sent to fictitious addresses in England.

==== Aftermath ====
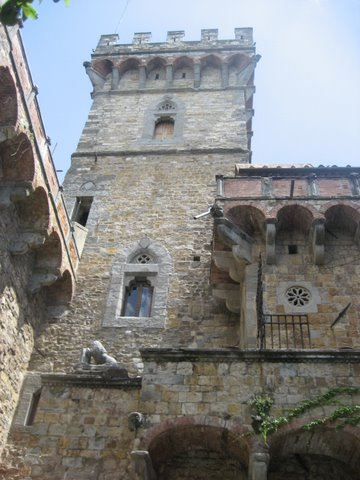
The castle pictured by John Dann in 2010

- John Leeming was the first officer to reach England from the prison camp, in April 1943. He had been medically repatriated by feigning paranoia.
- Carton de Wiart reached England in August 1943, having been involved in the Italian Armistice. He later reflected in his book Happy Odyssey (p. 184), after capture in North Africa, "I met Captain Camino, who had lived in England many years and afterwards proved himself most helpful to many British prisoners of war. Later Captain Camino took me on to the Cavalry barracks, where I was treated as an honoured guest, and I wish that I could meet some of those officers again and thank them for their courtesy and kindness to me."
- James Hargest was the first and only soldier to escape Vincigliata and reach England in November 1943. In doing so, he became the highest-ranking British officer to escape in either war. He wrote an account of his escape on his return in, Farewell Campo 12, with a dedication: "To my son Geoffrey who died of wounds in Italy, in March 1944". Hargest was killed in Normandy in 1944, and his book published posthumously in 1945.
- Philip Neame wrote the whole of his book, Playing with Strife, except for the last chapter, whilst a prisoner-of-war in Italy. He carried the manuscript when he was released from the castle during the Italian armistice in September 1943. It was concealed in a tomb by the Prior General in the monastery of Eremo, retrieved by a British MI9 agent (Signor Ruggero Cagnazzo) in November 1944, and finally published in 1947.

== Modern times ==
The castle had been acquired by the [Swiss-Israeli sculptor Gidon Graetz and his Norwegian wife Sunniva Rasmussen in the 1960s. Their son Bibi Graetz had studied art at Accademia di belle arti di Firenze in Florence but changed direction in the late 1990s, to become a highly acclaimed wine-maker running the Testamatta estate. He used his skills as an artist to design his own labels. His Soffocone di Vincigliata is made from single-vineyard grapes with a blending largely Sangiovese, with some Colorino and Canaiolo, giving an average production of about 800 cases. As of 2012, the family owners were offering the castle as a venue for special occasions such as weddings, gala dinners and wine tastings. Notable weddings to take place at the castle include that of footballer Theo Walcott and Melanie Slade in 2013. The castle was the venue for an episode of the BBC One MasterChef programme.

== See also ==
- List of POW camps in Italy
- The Sire of Vincigliata, a 1913 silent film

== Sources ==
- Carton de Wiart, Lieutenant-General Sir Adrian, V.C., K.B.E., C.M.G., D.S.O., Happy Odyssey, Jonathan Cape Ltd, 1950, in PAN paperback 1956, re-printed by Pen & Sword Books 2007, ISBN 1-84415-539-0. With foreword by Winston S. Churchill.
- Foot, M. R. D.; Langley, James (1979). MI9: Escape and Evasion 1939–1945. London: The Bodley Head. ISBN 978-0-316-28840-8.
- Dann, John, A Welsh Uncle Memories of Tom Morgan 1898-1957 FastPrint, Peterborough 2018 ISBN 978-178456-597-8. records details of CQMS Morgan's POW life and post war aftermath
- Felton, Mark, Castle of Eagles, -Escape from Mussolini's Colditz, Icon Book, 2017, ISBN 978-1-78578-282-4
- Brigadier James, C.B.E., D.S.O. M.C. Farewell Campo 12, Michael Joseph Ltd, 1945. With a sketch map of Castello Vincigliata (p. 85), route of capture and escape.
- Lamb, Richard War in Italy, 1943-45: A Brutal Story, Saint Martin's Press, New York, 1994. ISBN 978-0-312-11093-2.
- Leeming, John F. The Natives are Friendly, E. P. Dutton & Company, New York, 1951.
- Leeming, John F. Always To-Morrow, George G. Harrap & Co. Ltd, London, 1951. Illustrated with photographs and maps.
- Marcotti, Giuseppe Vincigliata (1879), Historical Print Editions, The British Library, ISBN 978-1-161-97020-3.
- Neame, Lieutenant-General Sir Philip, V.C., K.B.E., C.B., D.S.O. Playing with Strife, The Autobiography of a Soldier, George G. Harrap & Co. Ltd, 1947. Written whilst a POW, a narrative of Vincigliata as Campo P.G. 12; containing a scale plan of Castello di Vincigliata, and photographs taken by the author just after the war.
- Ranfurly, Countess of To War with Whitaker (Wartime diaries 1939–1945.) William Heinemann Ltd, London, 1994. ISBN 0-434-00224-0.
- Scott, Leader (1891). Vincigliata and Maiano. Florence: G. Barbèra.
- Underhill, M. L. New Zealand Chaplains in the Second World War, War History Branch, Dept. of Internal Affairs, Wellington, New Zealand, 1950.
- The Prisoner of War, official journal of the Prisoners of War Department of the British Red Cross and St John War Organisation, St James's Palace, London SW1. Magazines published monthly and sent to prisoners' families.

Vol.1 No: 12, April 1943 (P.G. 12 – visited December 1942)
Vol.1 No: 14, June 1943 (P.G. 12 – visited March 1943, with group photo of unnamed officers)
