= Daniel Knox, 6th Earl of Ranfurly =

60th Governor of the Bahamas

The Right Honourable The Earl of Ranfurly KCMG KStJ

60th Governor of the Bahamas
- In office 21 December 1953 – 1956
- Monarch: Elizabeth II
- Preceded by: Sir Robert Arthur Ross Neville
- Succeeded by: Sir Raynor Arthur

Personal details
- Born: 29 May 1914
- Died: 6 November 1988 (aged 74)

Military service
- Allegiance: United Kingdom
- Branch/service: British Army
- Years of service: 1936 –
- Rank: Lieutenant
- Unit: Sherwood Rangers Yeomanry
- Battles/wars: Second World War

Thomas Daniel Knox, 6th Earl of Ranfurly, KCMG, KStJ (29 May 1914 – 6 November 1988), known as Dan Ranfurly, was a British Army officer and farmer, who served as Governor of the Bahamas. His exploits in the Second World War, along with those of his wife, Hermione, and his valet, Whitaker, were chronicled in his wife's memoirs from the time, To War With Whitaker: The Wartime Diaries of the Countess of Ranfurly, 1939–1945.

== Background ==
Lord Ranfurly was born, patrilineally, into an Ulster-Scots aristocratic family and was the son of Captain Thomas Uchter Caulfield Knox, Viscount Northland, and succeeded his grandfather, The 5th Earl of Ranfurly, in the earldom in October 1933. He was educated at Eton and the Royal Military College, Sandhurst. He was commissioned into the Sherwood Rangers Yeomanry in 1936. He and his wife met in 1937 when he was an aide-de-camp to Lord Gowrie, the Governor-General of Australia, an appointment Ranfurly held from 1936 to 1938. Two years later, both aged 25, they returned to Britain and were married. They later had a daughter, Caroline.

== Action in World War II ==
On the outbreak of the Second World War, Second Lieutenant Lord (Dan) Ranfurly of the Nottinghamshire Yeomanry (Sherwood Rangers) – 1st Cavalry Division was initially posted to British-controlled Palestine, thence to join with the 7th Division in Egypt. His wife, violating multiple British Army protocols forbidding the wives of soldiers at the front, repeatedly hatched schemes to join him as he was shuffled across the Middle East and North Africa, finally succeeding to meet up with him in Cairo in 1941.

Soon after, Ranfurly, who had been appointed as ADC to Lt. Gen. Philip Neame, was captured with Neame in the Cyrenaica desert between Derna and Mechili on 6 April 1941. He was taken to Sulmona camp in the Abruzzo near Rome, but joined Neame again when they were both transferred to Castello di Vincigliata PG12 in October 1941. He was amongst many distinguished British officers, including generals Richard O'Connor and Adrian Carton de Wiart. He became friends with Carton De Wiart, and adapted to prison life, managing the officers' house-keeping and Red Cross parcels. As de Wiart wrote, 'He was our most expert gambler, did me the good turn of teaching me to play backgammon.' Boyd's ADC Flt. Lt. Leeming wrote 'Four more prisoners arrived ..including Lieutenant Lord Ranfurly, who took over the management of the household in my place. He helped with the tunnel escape. 'Air Marshal Owen Tudor Boyd and Ranfurly made a cover for our hole from the lift shaft to the chapel, and Ranfurly plastered it over and it was never detected'.

He was amongst the small party including some NCOs released by General Chiappe in September 1943 after the Italian Armistice. They were driven to Firenze Campo di Marte railway station from where a special train took them to Arezzo. The party eventually dispersed and spent many months with the partisans in the Apennines. He, together with Rudolph Vaughan, John Combe, Ted Todhunter and Guy Ruggles-Brise (who was an old school friend) from Vincigliata. Two young officers, American pilot Jack Reiter (who had been shot down over Italy, escaped from a military hospital to join the partisans), American diplomat Walter Orebaugh, together with John Kerin, an Irish Sapper, who they had picked up along the way, managed to reach the coast. After further delays, they put out to sea in a boat, which began to leak badly. After rowing and bailing for 24 hours they were at last picked up by an Italian vessel which landed them at Ancona, from where they were shipped to brigade HQ on 30 May 1944. Lady Ranfurly records this incident in her book of memoirs, To War with Whittaker.

== Post-war ==
Following the end of World War II, Lord Ranfurly worked briefly in insurance at Lloyd's of London, not long before being appointed Governor of the Bahamas by Winston Churchill. Ranfurly assumed office on 21 December 1953. While in the Bahamas, he and his wife began the Ranfurly Library Service in Nassau.

After they returned to England in 1957, Lady Ranfurly continued to ship books to parts of the world short on libraries, founding an organisation now known as Book Aid International. Lord Ranfurly, meanwhile, took up farming at his Buckinghamshire estate.

== Sources ==
- Kidd, Charles; Williamson, David (editors). Debrett's Peerage and Baronetage (1990 edition). New York: St Martin's Press, 1990.
- Leigh Rayment's Peerage Pages
- To War with Whitaker: The wartime diaries of The Countess of Ranfurly 1939-1945, William Heinemann Ltd, London 1994 ISBN 0-434-00224-0
- Happy Odyssey, Lt-Gen. Sir Carton De Wiart, V.C., K.B.E., C.M.G., D.S.O., Jonathan Cape Ltd, 1950, in PAN paperback 1956, re-printed by Pen & Sword Books 2007 ISBN 1-84415-539-0
- Playing with Strife: The Autobiography of a Soldier, Lt-Gen. Sir Philip Neame, V.C., K.B.E., C.B., D.S.O., George G Harrap & Co. Ltd, 1947.
- Farewell Campo 12, Brigadier James Hargest, C.B.E., D.S.O. M.C., Michael Joseph Ltd, 1945.
- 'Always To-Morrow' , 1951, John F Leeming, George G Harrap & Co. Ltd, London, 188p, Illustrated with photographs and maps. (tells of the authors' experiences as a prisoner of the Italians during World War II)

Government offices
Preceded by Sir Robert Arthur Ross Neville	Governor of the Bahamas; 1953–1956	Succeeded by Sir Raynor Arthur
Peerage of Ireland
Preceded by Uchter John Mark Knox	Earl of Ranfurly; 1933–1988	Succeeded by Gerald Francoys Needham Knox
