= Walter Orebaugh =

American intelligence officer (1910–2001)

Walter W. Orebaugh Jr. (March 19, 1910 – June 12, 2001) was an American Foreign Service Officer, intelligence officer and university director. For the Foreign Service he served posts in Wellington, Montreal, Trieste, Venice, Nice, Monte Carlo, Florence and Bridgetown. For his service in France and Italy during World War II, Orebaugh was awarded the Medal of Freedom.

Orebaugh is a native of Wichita, Kansas and is a graduate of University of Wichita.

== Service during World War II ==
In November, 1942, Orebaugh was consul at the American Consulate in Nice, Vichy France. At the order of American Chargé d’Affaires Pinkney Tuck, he quickly set up a consulate in Monaco. The reason for setting up a diplomatic mission in Monaco came to light a few days later with the Allied invasion of French North Africa and the quick closing of US diplomatic missions in Vichy France. The US had hoped to have a listening station in independent Monaco for which the consulate would serve. However, shortly after Orenbaugh set up the consulate Monaco was occupied by Italian forces and he and his small staff were taken into Italian custody. He was then shipped to Italy, where he was to be eventually traded for Allied prisoners. But after the Armistice of Cassibile and the subsequent German occupation of northern Italy and the disarming of non-Fascist Italian forces he found himself in the hostile Italian Social Republic with risk of becoming a German prisoner as the German army was approaching his detainment location in Perugia. He elected to escape with the help of a local Italian family who hid him in their house. As he was trapped in Italy he decided to assist the Italian resistance movement and became a leader in a resistance group called the San Faustino Partisan band. He participated in many actions in the mountains of central Italy and sometimes leading daring raids on German and Italian Fascist supply and ammunition depots. He and another Italian partisan escaped to a hideout with other Allied personnel and he eventually sailed in a boat with some British and Americans to Allied lines on May 10, 1944. To the Allies he was able to give detailed intelligence of Italian resistance and German forces and helped facilitate supply lines to the resistance groups behind Axis lines. After briefly returning to the United States, he returned to Italy before the war's end and served as consul in Florence.

Orebaugh wrote a book about his service during the war entitled Guerilla in Striped Pants: A U.S. Diplomat Joins the Italian Resistance.

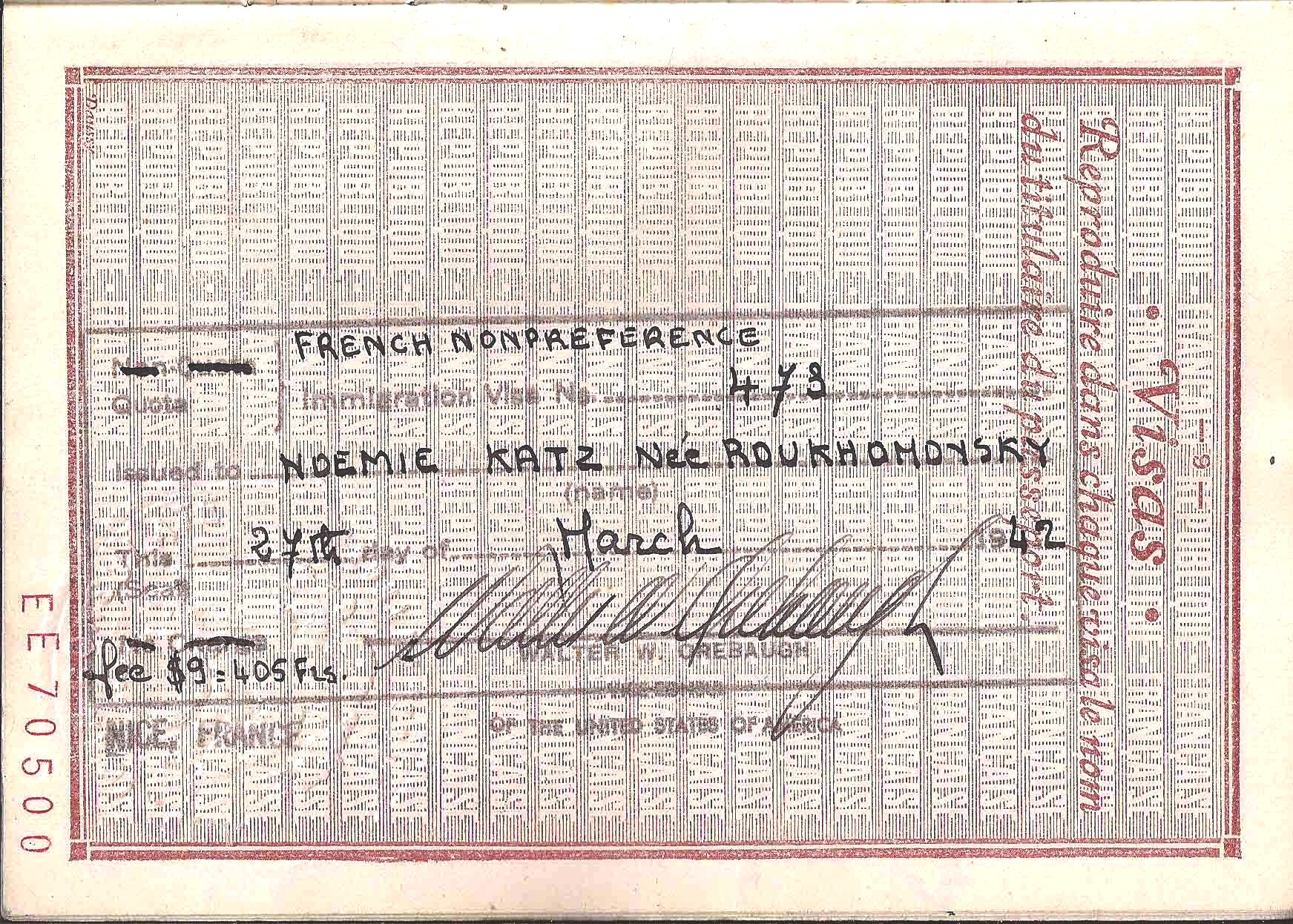
US consul Walter W. Orebaugh signed visa from 1942, Vichy France.
