= Philip Neame =

British Army general (1888–1978)

Lieutenant-General Sir Philip Neame VC KBE CB DSO
- Neame as a young officer
- Born: 12 December 1888; Faversham, Kent, England
- Died: 28 April 1978 (aged 89); Selling, Kent, England
- Military career
- Allegiance: United Kingdom
- Branch: British Army
- Service years: 1908–1947
- Rank: Lieutenant-General
- Service number: 4243
- Units: Royal Engineers
- Commands: British Forces in the Channel Islands (1945–1947); Cyrenaica (1941); British Forces in Palestine and Trans-Jordan (1940–1941); 4th Indian Infantry Division (1940); Royal Military Academy, Woolwich (1938–1939)
- Conflicts: First World War; Second World War
- Awards: Victoria Cross; Knight Commander of the Order of the British Empire; Companion of the Order of the Bath; Distinguished Service Order; Knight of the Order of St John; Mentioned in Despatches (6); Legion of Honour (France); Croix de guerre (France); Croix de guerre (Belgium); Order of the White Lion (Czechoslovakia)
- Other work: Olympic gold medalist Lieutenant Governor of Guernsey

Lieutenant-General Sir Philip Neame, VC, KBE, CB, DSO (12 December 1888 – 28 April 1978) was a senior British Army officer and a recipient of the Victoria Cross, the highest award for gallantry in the face of the enemy that can be awarded to British and Commonwealth forces, and the winner of an Olympic Games gold medal; he is the only person to achieve both distinctions.

During the Second World War, in the spring of 1941, Neame was commander of British troops in Cyrenaica (north-eastern Libya), recently conquered from the Italians by General Richard O'Connor. However, as the region was retaken by the newly-arrived Afrika Korps under Erwin Rommel, Neame and O'Connor were taken prisoner. Both men remained in captivity in Italy until the autumn of 1943.

== Early life and military career ==
Philip Neame was born on 12 December 1888 in Faversham in the County of Kent, the son of Kathleen Neame (née Stunt) and Frederick Neame (b. 1847). He received his education at Cheltenham College, and the British Army's Royal Military Academy at Woolwich, Kent.

Upon graduating from the Royal Military Academy, Neame received a commission as a second lieutenant into the Royal Engineers in July 1908. He was promoted to lieutenant in August 1910, whilst serving with the 15th Field Company.

== First World War ==
The declaration of war in August 1914 found Neame with the 15th Field Company in the Gibraltar Garrison. The company joined the British Expeditionary Force (BEF) on the Western Front in October 1914.

During the First Battle of Ypres in October 1914, Neame experienced first hand in the trenches the inferiority of the British issue hand-grenades compared to their German equivalent, and set about creating an alternative, the sappers improvising rudimentary but effective hand grenades made from empty jam tins filled with scrap metal, with the charge being created using gun-cotton, and a cord-fuse projecting from the end of the tin, requiring ignition by flame.

=== Victoria Cross ===
Neame was 26 years old when the following deed took place, for which he received the Victoria Cross (VC):

For conspicuous bravery on the 19th December, near Neuve Chapelle, when, notwithstanding the very heavy rifle fire and bomb-throwing by the enemy, he succeeded in holding them back and rescuing all the wounded men whom it was possible to move.

During a minor night trench action on the Western Front in the Neuve Chapelle district five days before Christmas 1914, Neame was leading a party of sappers in action when he was requested by the commanding officer of a battalion of the West Yorkshire Regiment to go forward and to strengthen the defences in a recently captured German trench. When he got there he met another commissioned officer who informed him that the Germans were counter-attacking with bombs, that his own bombers had all been wounded and that the bombs that were left would not go off. At this Neame went further up the trench to the contact point to talk to one of the surviving bombers there, and discovered that the problem was that he wasn't able use the bombs because there were no fuzee matches left. Neame, knowing how to technically ignite the grenades without a fuzee match by holding a regular match-head on the grenade's fuse and striking a match box across it, commenced lighting and throwing grenades in this fashion into the German trenches at the two different directions where a German dawn counter-attack was materializing, holding it back whilst under continual return fire for forty-five minutes whilst the West Yorks Regiment evacuated its wounded behind him back towards the original British frontline trench.

Neame was promoted to the rank of captain in 1915, and was mentioned in despatches in February 1915, and again in January 1916. He was awarded the Distinguished Service Order (DSO) in January 1916.

After a short period as a staff officer (GSO3) from October 1915, he was appointed brigade major of the 168th Brigade, 56th (London) Division, in February 1916, staffing this post through the Somme offensive in 1916, including the actions at Gommecourt on 1 July, and the Battle of Ginchy in September, until relinquishing it for another staff (GSO2) assignment in November 1916.

He was promoted to brevet major in the 1917 New Year honours list. He received further mentions in despatches in January and December 1917. In June 1918 he moved up to a senior staff post (GSO1), and ended the war in November 1918 with the temporary rank of lieutenant colonel.

== Inter-war military career and Olympian ==
Neame was honoured for his war service in France with the Legion of Honour (Croix de Chevalier) in January 1919, and the Croix de guerre in July. He was also awarded the Belgian Croix de guerre. In June 1919 he was noted in The London Gazette as being amongst several names intended for the rank of brevet lieutenant-colonel, with the substantive rank of major. but the actual gazetting to brevet lieutenant-colonel did not appear until June 1922, and his substantive rank was finally promoted from captain to major in January 1925.

Medal record

Men's shooting

Representing Great Britain

Olympic Games
Gold medal – first place	1924 Paris	Team running deer, double shots

Neame was a member of Great Britain's 1924 Olympic Running Deer team at Paris and is the only Victoria Cross recipient who has won an Olympic gold medal. The Running Deer competition was one of the shooting events at the games. It involved teams of four (firing single shots), where a moving target simulated the animal.

After serving as an instructor at the Staff College, Camberley, from March 1919 to April 1923, Neame was appointed brigade major of an Infantry Brigade at Aldershot in January 1924 and then saw service in India with the Bengal Sappers and Miners from 1925 before attending the Imperial Defence College in 1930. In June 1932 Neame was promoted full colonel (skipping the substantive lieutenant-colonel rank) and became a General Staff Officer 1 in the Waziristan District in India. In 1933 he was badly mauled by a tigress whilst hunting in India. He was admitted to a hospital, Lady Minto Nursing Association, in Bareilly where he was nursed to health by Harriet Alberta Drew. He married the nurse, taking leave from India towards the end of 1933 whereupon he was on half pay without appointment until May 1934.

In July 1934 Neame was granted the temporary rank of brigadier in order to take up an appointment as brigadier general staff (BGS) with Eastern Command, India. He relinquished this position on 6 February 1938 and on 28 February he was promoted to major general (with seniority backdated to 19 December 1937) and returned to England to serve as commandant of the Royal Military Academy, Woolwich, in 1938. He was appointed a Companion of the Order of the Bath (CB) in January 1939.

== Second World War ==
While Commandant at the Military College, Neame had been given to understand that should war be declared, he would be appointed as Chief of General Staff to the British Expeditionary Force's putative C-in-C, John Dill. In the event, Lord Gort was appointed C-in-C, with Henry Pownall as CGS and Neame as his deputy responsible for operations and staff duties. Neame organised defences and planned for the campaign, but in February 1940 he was posted to Egypt to command the 4th Indian Infantry Division.

=== Middle East theatre ===
In August 1940 Neame was made General Officer Commanding British Forces in Palestine and Trans-Jordan in the acting rank of lieutenant-general where his responsibilities were mainly in the area of internal security (the local police forces being placed under his direction).

=== Defeat in North Africa ===
In February 1941 Neame was appointed General Officer Commanding & Military Governor of Cyrenaica, which had been captured from the Italians by the British Empire's rapid advance in the opening moves of the North African campaign during Operation Compass. Whilst being responsible for a large area of ground, Neame's command had been stripped of many of its battle-hardened units, which had been withdrawn towards Cairo either for re-fitting, or to take part in the Battle of Greece, and he was left with little air support from the constrained Royal Air Force (RAF) units available in North Africa at this time.

The two primary formations under his command to guard Cyrenaica were the newly fielded 2nd Armoured Division, and 9th Australian Division. The 2nd Armoured Division had only recently arrived from the British Isles, was under-strength, lacking in training and equipment adapted for desert warfare conditions, and proved to be no match for what it was about to meet in the field in the form of Nazi Germany's First Axis Offensive in North Africa, which was launched at the end of March 1941 by its newly arrived Afrika Korps, led by General Erwin Rommel. Australia's 9th Division, while well led by Leslie Morshead, was not yet fully trained, and was suffering from a shortage of transport vehicles.

==== First Axis Offensive in North Africa ====
Neame's Headquarters lacked accurate intelligence information from its senior command echelon, and had no warning about the nature or scale of the massed attack that it was about to be hit with, in a theatre scenario which was thought to be dormant at that time through Italian massed defeat and tactical acquiescence, and he was further hampered by an over-extended line of supply stretching back over many hundreds of miles to Alexandria and Cairo. With hesitant handling of his unprepared troop dispositions in response to a rapidly changing and unexpectedly threatening situation, as the Afrika Korps and Italian Army poured toward him at a terrific speed of advance and began on 24 March 1941 to attack his units' outposts and appear suddenly amidst, and even far behind them in the lines of supply routes, and his command being limited in effective control by a Headquarters not sited in a battle station and remote from the action, Neame was over the next few days of fighting overwhelmed by Rommel. Faced with the apparent danger of the 2nd Armoured Division's disintegration which he perceived from its chaotic radio-traffic as it struggled to cope with the rolling blows it was receiving, he ordered the forces under him to fall back eastward in an uncoordinated fashion to avoid being cut off and completely destroyed by the sudden advance of the enemy.

On 6 April 1941, while driving in a small convoy of vehicles to a newly established Headquarters, Neame and his travelling companions, Lieutenant-General Richard O'Connor (who had been rapidly dispatched to join Neame's Headquarters by General Archibald Wavell who was alarmed at the apparent collapse of Neame's forces) and Brigadier John Combe, were over-run and captured by a German advanced force led by Gerhard von Schwerin. Disaster was averted for the majority of the forces under Neame's command through a rapid retreat by the 9th Australian Division into the coastal town of Tobruk, where it was joined by 3 Indian Motor Brigade, and surviving remnants of 2nd Armoured Division (most of which had been over-run and captured in the rout), in hastily organising a defensive perimeter, which would go on to withstand the Axis Forces' subsequent extended siege.

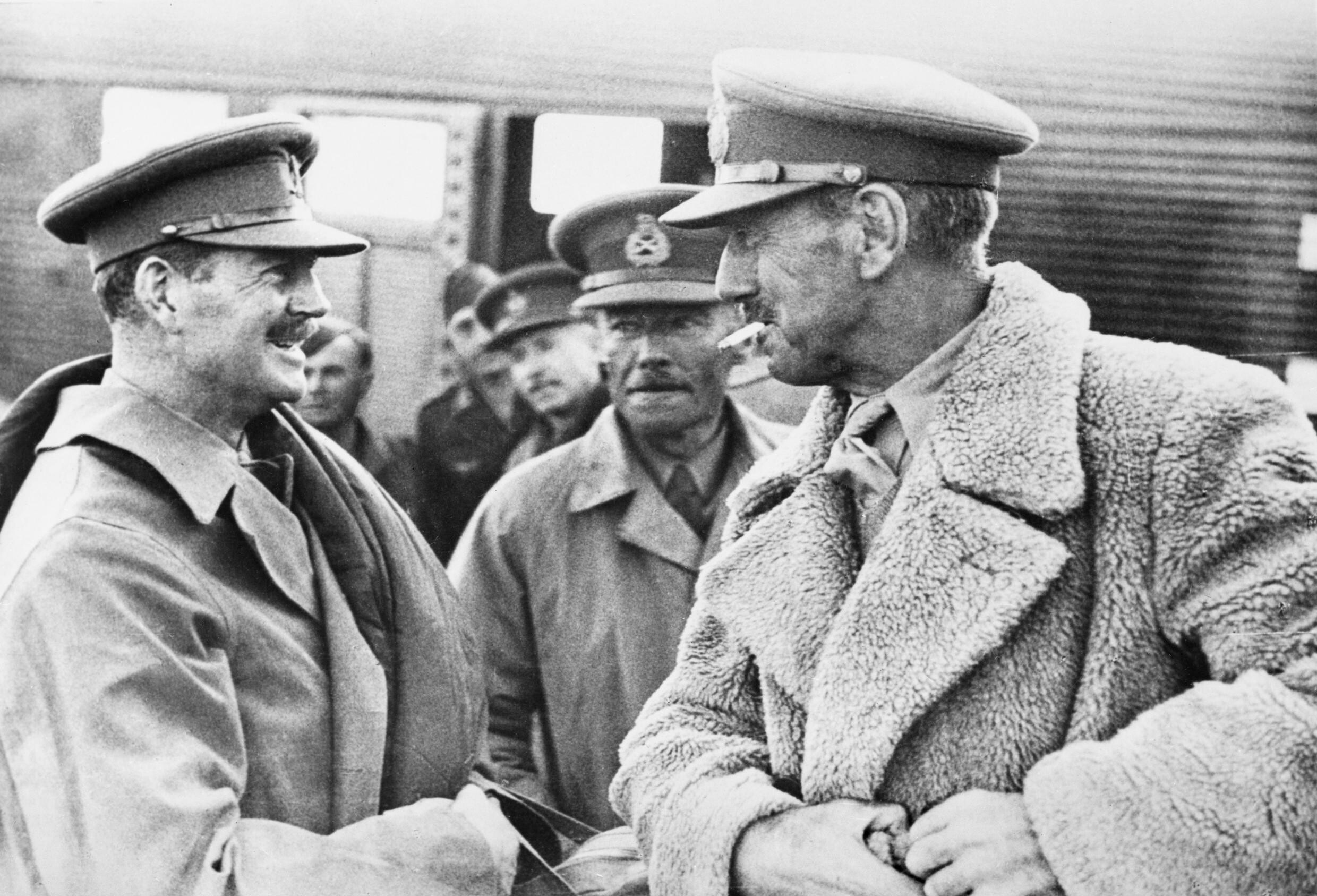
Neame (centre), Brigadier John Combe (left), and Major-General Michael Gambier-Parry (right) following their capture in North Africa

=== Prisoner of war in Italy ===
Along with the almost 3000 men of the 2nd Armoured Division who had been captured in Rommel's advance, Neame with generals O'Connor and Combe were transported across the Mediterranean Sea for incarceration in Italy, first being held as prize prisoners at the Villa Orsini near Sulmona, then at Castello di Vincigliata PG12 near Florence. Whilst at PG12 they took part in a number of escape attempts along with General Adrian Carton de Wiart (a fellow VC recipient), and Edward Todhunter.

After the successful escape of six men through a tunnel that Neame had designed in April 1943, including two New Zealander brigadiers James Hargest and Reginald Miles who disappeared in the direction of Switzerland, the Italian Army in reprisal sent Neame's batman Gunner Pickford (Royal Horse Artillery) to another camp.

Following the Italian Armistice in September 1943, Neame was released from incarceration by the Italian Army, but faced a hazardous journey of several hundred miles through a semi-chaotic countryside, at that time still occupied by German forces, in areas in conflict with the Italians, to reach the safety of the joint British and American lines. Having hidden a manuscript which he had been writing in captivity of his memoires (to be recovered after the war), Neame's party, including Air Marshal Owen Boyd and General Richard O'Connor, made their way southwards with the help of friendly Italians along the route. Hiring a boat at Cattolica they sailed to the port of Termoli which by the time of their arrival on 20 December 1943 had fallen into the possession of the advancing Allied armies.

=== Repatriation to England ===
Arriving back in England on 25 December 1943, having travelled via Tunis (after interviews with Generals Dwight Eisenhower and Harold Alexander, and also Winston Churchill), Neame found there was no job waiting for him in the army, with his star in the descendent after the debacle of his capture in 1941, but he remained on the Active List until the end of the war in his substantive rank of major-general.

== Postwar military career and retirement ==
Neame's medal collection at the Imperial War Museum

In August 1945 Neame was appointed Lieutenant Governor of Guernsey in the local rank of lieutenant-general where he served until 1953. He also held the honorary posts of Colonel Commandant of the Corps of Royal Engineers from February 1945 to 1955 and Colonel 131 (Airborne) Engineer Regiment from January 1948.

Neame was knighted as a Knight Commander of the Order of the British Empire in June 1946, and made a knight of the charitable Order of St John in the same year. In January 1955 he was appointed a Deputy Lieutenant of the County of Kent.

== Personal life ==
Neame married Harriet Drew (1906–1994) in 1934, the marriage producing four children: Gerald (born 1935), Veronica (born 1937), Nigel (born 1946), Philip (born 1946). The latter's youngest child, also named Philip, served as commander of D Company, 2nd Parachute Regiment, in 1982 during the Falklands War.

Neame died at Selling in Kent on 28 April 1978, in his eighty-ninth year. His body was buried in the graveyard of St Mary the Virgin Church, in Selling. (Note: There is a bronze plaque within the church detailing Neame's awards and titles, but the granite gravestone makes no mention of them, bearing only his name.) His medals and awards are held by the Imperial War Museum in London.

== Bibliography ==
- Arthur, Max (2002). Forgotten Voices of the Great War. Ebury Press.
- Buzzell, Nora, ed. (1997). The Register of the Victoria Cross. Cheltenham, Gloucestershire: This England Alma House. ISBN 0-906324-27-0.
- De Wiart, Lt-Gen. Sir Carton (2007) [1950]. Happy Odyssey. Pen & Sword Books. ISBN 978-1-84415-539-2.
- Gliddon, Gerald (2011) [1994]. 1914. VCs of the First World War. Stroud, Gloucestershire: The History Press. ISBN 978-0752459080.
- Foot, M.R.D.; Langley, J.M (1979). MI9 Escape & Evasion 1939–45. The Bodley Head.
- Hargest, Brigadier James (1945). Farewell Campo 12. Michael Joseph.
- Harvey, David; Best, Brian (2010) [1999]. Monuments To Courage. Naval & Military Press. ISBN 9781847348098.
- Mead, Richard (2007). Churchill's Lions: A biographical guide to the key British generals of World War II. Stroud (UK): Spellmount. ISBN 978-1-86227-431-0.
- Napier, Gerald (1998). The Sapper VCs: The Story of Valour in the Royal Engineers and Its Associated Corps. The Stationery Office. ISBN 978-0117728356.
- Neame, Philip (1947). Playing with Strife, The Autobiography of a Soldier, Lt-Gen. Sir Philip Neame, V.C., K.B.E., C.B., D.S.O. George G Harrap.
- Ranfurly, Countess (1994). To War with Whitaker, The wartime diaries of The Countess of Ranfurly 1939–1945. London: William Heinemann. ISBN 0-434-00224-0.
- Smart, Nick (2005). Biographical Dictionary of British Generals of the Second World War. Barnesley: Pen & Sword. ISBN 1844150496.

Military offices
Preceded by Arthur Goschen	Commandant of the Royal Military Academy Woolwich; 1938–1939	College closed for the war
Preceded by The Hon. P. Gerald Scarlet	GOC 4th Indian Infantry Division; February–August 1940	Succeeded by Noel Beresford-Peirse
Preceded by George Giffard	GOC British Forces in Palestine and Trans-Jordan; 1940–1941	Succeeded by Sir Henry Maitland Wilson
Preceded by Sir Henry Maitland Wilson	Military Governor of Cyrenaica; February – April 1941	Post disbanded
Government offices
Preceded by Charles Gage Stuart (British Military Government)	Lieutenant Governor of Guernsey; 1945–1953	Succeeded by Sir Thomas Elmhirst
