= To War with Whitaker =

1994 memoir by Hermione, Countess of Ranfurly

To War with Whitaker: The Wartime Diaries of the Countess of Ranfurly 1939–1945
- Author: Hermione, Countess of Ranfurly
- Language: English
- Genre: memoir, diary
- Publisher: William Heinemann; Mandarin
- Publication date: 1994 (hardback); 1995 (paperback)
- Publication place: United Kingdom
- Media type: Print
- Pages: 376

To War with Whitaker: The Wartime Diaries of the Countess of Ranfurly 1939–1945 is a memoir of World War II written, in diary form, by Hermione, Countess of Ranfurly. It was first published by William Heinemann in 1994. The following year, Mandarin Publishing issued it in paperback, describing the memoir as "A love story that knows no bounds":

When World War II broke out, Dan Ranfurly was dispatched to the Middle East with his faithful valet, Whitaker. These are the diaries of his young wife, Hermione, who, defying the War Office, raced off in hot pursuit of her husband. When Dan was taken prisoner, Hermione vowed never to return home until they were reunited. For six years, travelling alone from Cape Town to Palestine, and meeting such charismatic characters as Churchill, Eisenhower, and a parrot called Coco on the way, she kept her promise.

The Countess's lively prose style is characterised by frankness, a sharp eye for character – not least that of the short, chubby, phlegmatic valet Whitaker – and an acute ear for dialogue. For example, when the Earl received a telegram at the outbreak of war in 1939 ordering him to report to his regiment, she writes: "After reading this Dan asked Whitaker if he would like to go with him. The old fatty looked over the top of his spectacles and said, 'To the War, my Lord? Very good, my Lord.'"

Her husband, The 6th Earl of Ranfurly, a nobleman of Ulster-Scots descent, was a lieutenant in the Sherwood Rangers Yeomanry. Lord Ranfurly, often known simply as Dan Ranfurly, was captured by soldiers of Rommel's Afrika Korps, along with General Sir Richard O'Connor and other officers, in Libya in April 1941 when their driver became lost in the dark. A military historian later described it as "the most valuable car-load of booty to fall to the Afrika Korps during its entire existence". Dan spent the next two years as a prisoner-of-war in Italy.

Dan and other British officers escaped following the Italian surrender in 1943 and, after several months on the run behind German lines, he was finally reunited with his wife in Algiers in May 1944. After the war, Lord Ranfurly served as Governor of the Bahamas, where his wife established a lending library service in Nassau that she later extended to other parts of the world in need of English language books. That service later became Book Aid International.

When the Countess died in 2001, her obituarist for the Daily Telegraph wrote: "Hermione, Countess of Ranfurly, who has died aged 87, was the author of one of the most delightful memoirs of recent times, To War with Whitaker (1994), and the kind of woman for whom words such as pluck and spirit might have been invented."

The film rights to Lady Ranfurly's diary were optioned by the Los Angeles-based production company Grandiosity Films in 2016.
