= Dudley Ward (British Army officer) =

British Army general (1905–1991)

General Sir Dudley Ward GCB KBE DSO DL
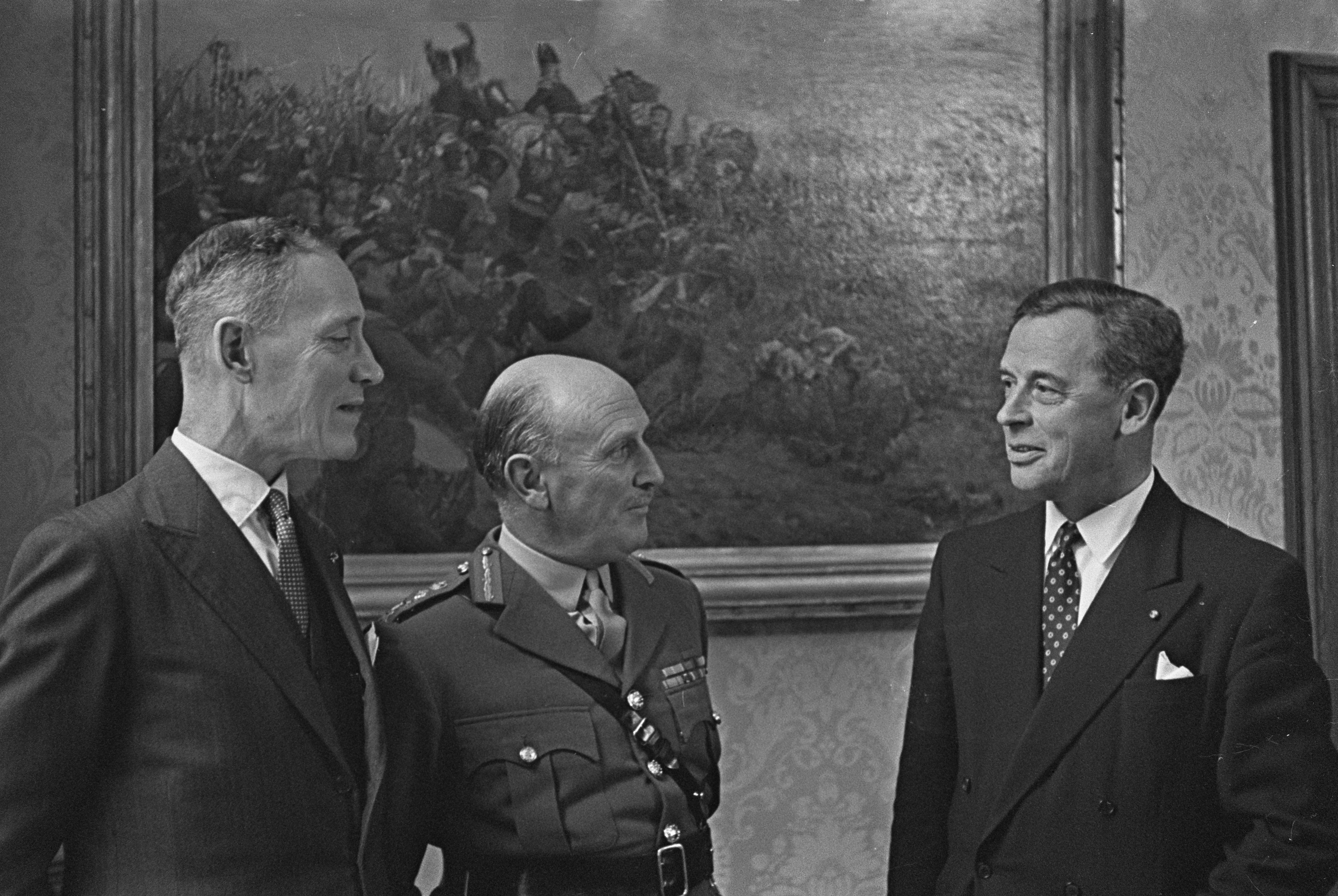
- Lieutenant-General Sir Dudley Ward (centre) visiting the Netherlands in 1959.
- Born: 27 January 1905; Avenue Road, Wimborne, Dorset, England
- Died: 28 December 1991 (aged 86)
- Military career
- Allegiance: United Kingdom
- Branch: British Army
- Service years: 1926–1965
- Rank: General
- Service number: 41238
- Units: Dorsetshire Regiment; King's Regiment (Liverpool)
- Commands: Gibraltar (1962–1965); Near East Command (1960–1962); British Army of the Rhine (1957–1959); I Corps (1951–1952); Staff College, Camberley (1948–1951); 4th Infantry Division (1944–1945); 17th Infantry Brigade (1943–1944); 231st Infantry Brigade (1943); 43rd (Wessex) Reconnaissance Regiment (1941–1942)
- Conflicts: Second World War
- Awards: Knight Grand Cross of the Order of the Bath; Knight Commander of the Order of the British Empire; Companion of the Distinguished Service Order; Mentioned in Despatches; Commander of the Legion of Merit (United States)
- Other work: Deputy Lieutenant of Suffolk; Hon. Colonel University Training Corps (Liverpool) (1951–1957); Colonel Commandant, Royal Electrical and Mechanical Engineers (1958–1963); Colonel, King's Regiment (Liverpool) (1957)

General Sir Alfred Dudley Ward, GCB, KBE, DSO, DL (27 January 1905 – 28 December 1991) was a senior British Army officer who saw distinguished active service during the Second World War and later became Governor of Gibraltar. Serving as an ordinary soldier for three years before being sent for officer training in 1926, slow peacetime career progression saw Ward achieving the rank of captain only in 1937. However, the Second World War, which began just two years later, allowed him to demonstrate his high ability as both a staff officer and a commander of troops in the field. Receiving command of the 4th Infantry Division at the unusually young age of 39 years and 3 months old, he led the division in Italy and Greece from 1944 to 1945. After the war ended in 1945, Ward went on to hold several staff and field appointments at the highest levels, including Deputy Chief of the Imperial General Staff (DCIGS) and Commander-in-Chief of the British Army of the Rhine, retiring as a full general in 1965.

== Early life and military career ==
Dudley Ward was born on 27 January 1905 in Avenue Road, Wimborne, Dorset, England, the son of Lionell Howell Ward and Lillie Maud (née Morgan). Educated at Wimborne Grammar School, Ward went on to serve in the British Army as an other rank for three years before entering the Royal Military College, Sandhurst. From Sandhurst he was commissioned as a second lieutenant into the Dorsetshire Regiment in January 1929. In December 1931 he was posted to India to be aide-de-camp to the Commander of the Lahore District, achieved promotion to lieutenant in January 1932, and completed his posting in September 1932. He went on to the Staff College, Quetta in 1935, where Bernard Montgomery was one of his instructors. In 1937, Ward was promoted to captain, transferring to the King's Regiment (Liverpool) for an appropriate vacancy. In February 1939 he was seconded to India for staff service as a General staff Officer Grade 3 (GSO3), but was recalled to London in July.

== Second World War ==
=== Service in the United Kingdom ===
By the outbreak of the Second World War in September 1939, Ward was serving as a GSO2 in the Directorate of Military Intelligence at the War Office in London. In May 1940 Ward was appointed as an instructor at the Staff College, Camberley, before returning to the War Office a year later. In late 1941 he was selected for command and was posted to lead the 43rd (Wessex) Reconnaissance Regiment (43 Recce), previously the 5th Battalion, Gloucestershire Regiment, initially the reconnaissance unit of the 48th (South Midland) Infantry Division, a Territorial Army (TA) formation, and then, from November 1941, of the 43rd (Wessex) Infantry Division, another TA unit. The division, then commanded by Major General Charles Allfrey succeeded in March 1942 by Major General Ivor Thomas, was serving in Kent under XII Corps, then commanded byLieutenant General James Gammell, itself serving under South-Eastern Command, under Lieutenant General Bernard Montgomery. Under Montgomery numerous large-scale exercises became the order of the day, most notable among them Exercise Tiger in May 1942.

Ward remained with 43 Recce until July 1942 when he became Brigadier General Staff (BGS) XII Corps, still under Gammell but commanded from November by Lieutenant General Montagu Stopford. XII Corps was stationed in Kent where it formed part of South-Eastern Command. Throughout the rest of 1942 and into 1943, the corps, with the 3rd, 43rd (Wessex), 53rd (Welsh) Infantry Divisions under command, participated in numerous large-scale exercises, most notably in Exercise Spartan in March 1943, the largest military exercise held in the United Kingdom. Stopford appears to have formed a high opinion of Ward, as he recommended him for command in the field, which saw him depart for the Mediterranean in September 1943.

=== Italy and Greece ===
In late September 1943 Ward exchanged jobs with Brigadier Roy Urquhart to take command of the 231st Brigade Group while Urquhart became BGS XII Corps, which had seen recent action in the Allied invasion of Sicily (Operation Husky). However, within a week of arriving he was ordered to exchange jobs once more, and assumed command of the 17th Infantry Brigade which, strangely, Stopford, his corps commander in England, had commanded in France in 1940. The brigade was one of three which formed part of Major General Gerard Bucknall's 5th Infantry Division, which Ward led in the early stages of the Italian campaign as part of the British Eighth Army, commanded by Montgomery.

The brigade saw action during the Eighth Army's advance from Foggia, notably on the Moro River in late 1943, before the 5th Division, initially under Lieutenant General Charles Allfrey's V Corps, was, due to a lack of progress on the Eighth Army's front, switched to Italy's western seaboard, on the left flank of Lieutenant General Sir Richard McCreery's British X Corps, which itself formed the left wing of the US Fifth Army on the Winter Line (also known as the Gustav Line) in early January 1944. Ward's brigade, as part of the First Battle of Monte Cassino, conducted an amphibious crossing of the Garigliano river in mid-January and was involved in heavy fighting until the end of the month.

In early March, the 5th Division, now under Major General Philip Gregson-Ellis, was relieved by elements of the newly-arrived US 88th Division and moved to the Anzio beachhead to relieve the exhausted British 56th Division, which had fought alongside the 5th Division during First Cassino, with Ward's brigade relieving the 56th Division's 168th Brigade on 9 March. Ward's 17th Brigade, now on the defensive, was involved in further heavy fighting in "The Wadis" on the beachheads' left flank. Conditions at Anzio became more alike to the trench warfare which had consumed so much of the fighting on the Western Front during the First World War. Due to his excellent record of service so far in Italy, Ward was appointed a Companion of the Distinguished Service Order (DSO) in April 1944.

It was likely this exemplary record which resulted in his next appointment. Given the acting rank of major general, unusual for someone still under the age of forty, Ward became the General Officer Commanding (GOC) of the 4th Infantry Division, one of the four pre-war Regular army divisions. This made Ward, at the time, one of the youngest division commanders in the British Army (only George Roberts, James Cassels, and Richard Hull being younger). The division, composed of the 10th, 12th and 28th Infantry Brigades, along with supporting divisional troops, had only recently arrived in Italy from Egypt, where it had been refitting since the end of the Tunisian campaign in mid-May 1943 and had to be rapidly prepared and brought to peak fitness.

The division, serving as part of Lieutenant General Sidney Kirkman's XIII Corps, had recently arrived in Italy to reinforce the Eighth Army and was assigned a major role in the forthcoming offensive that was intended to finally break through the Gustav Line. Together with the 8th Indian Infantry Division, the 4th's role was to create several bridgeheads across the Gari river (wrongly referred to as the Rapido in contemporary sources) in the Fourth and final Battle of Monte Cassino the following month, where Captain Richard Wakeford of the 2/4th Battalion, Hampshire Regiment, of the 28th Brigade, was awarded the division's first and only Victoria Cross (VC) of the war. After successfully completing its task, the division, after having sustained heavy casualties, was rested until late June when it rejoined the front line on the Trasimene Line.

In August the division, now serving as part of Lieutenant General Charles Keightley's V Corps (later transferring to I Canadian Corps), found itself once more on the Adriatic coast taking part in Operation Olive, the Eighth Army's attack on the Gothic Line. In December 1944, with progress in Italy having slowed due to the severe winter weather, combined with strong German resistance, the division expected to be sent to the Middle East to rest and refit, but was instead moved to Greece, where it was involved in fighting against Communist partisans opposed to the new provisional government. By mid-January order was restored and in April 1945 Ward handed over command of the 4th Division to Major General Colin Callander, where he became chief of staff to Lieutenant General Ronald Scobie, the British commander in Greece.

For his services in Italy Ward was appointed a Commander of the Order of the British Empire in April 1945, and a Companion of the Order of the Bath in July of the same year. He also received the Legion of Merit (Degree of Commander) from the United States for his service to the Allied cause.

== Senior command ==
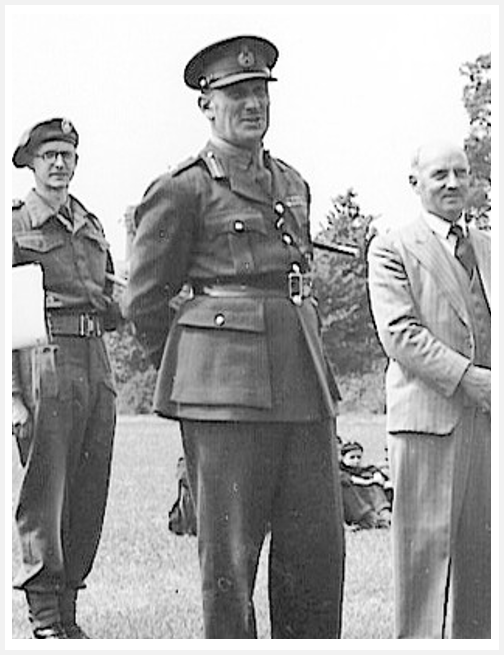
General Sir Dudley Ward as Governor of Gibraltar.

After the war, having demonstrated in the previous five years high competence as both a field commander and staff officer, Ward received appointments in both disciplines at the highest levels. He was promoted to substantive major general in 1947 and appointed in quick succession as Director of Military Operations at the War Office and commandant of the Staff College, Camberley, in 1947 and 1948 respectively. He assumed command of I Corps in Germany in the rank of lieutenant general and was advanced to Knight Commander of the Order of the British Empire in the 1953 New Year Honours. He returned to Britain in 1953 as Deputy Chief of the Imperial General Staff, relinquishing the post in October 1956.

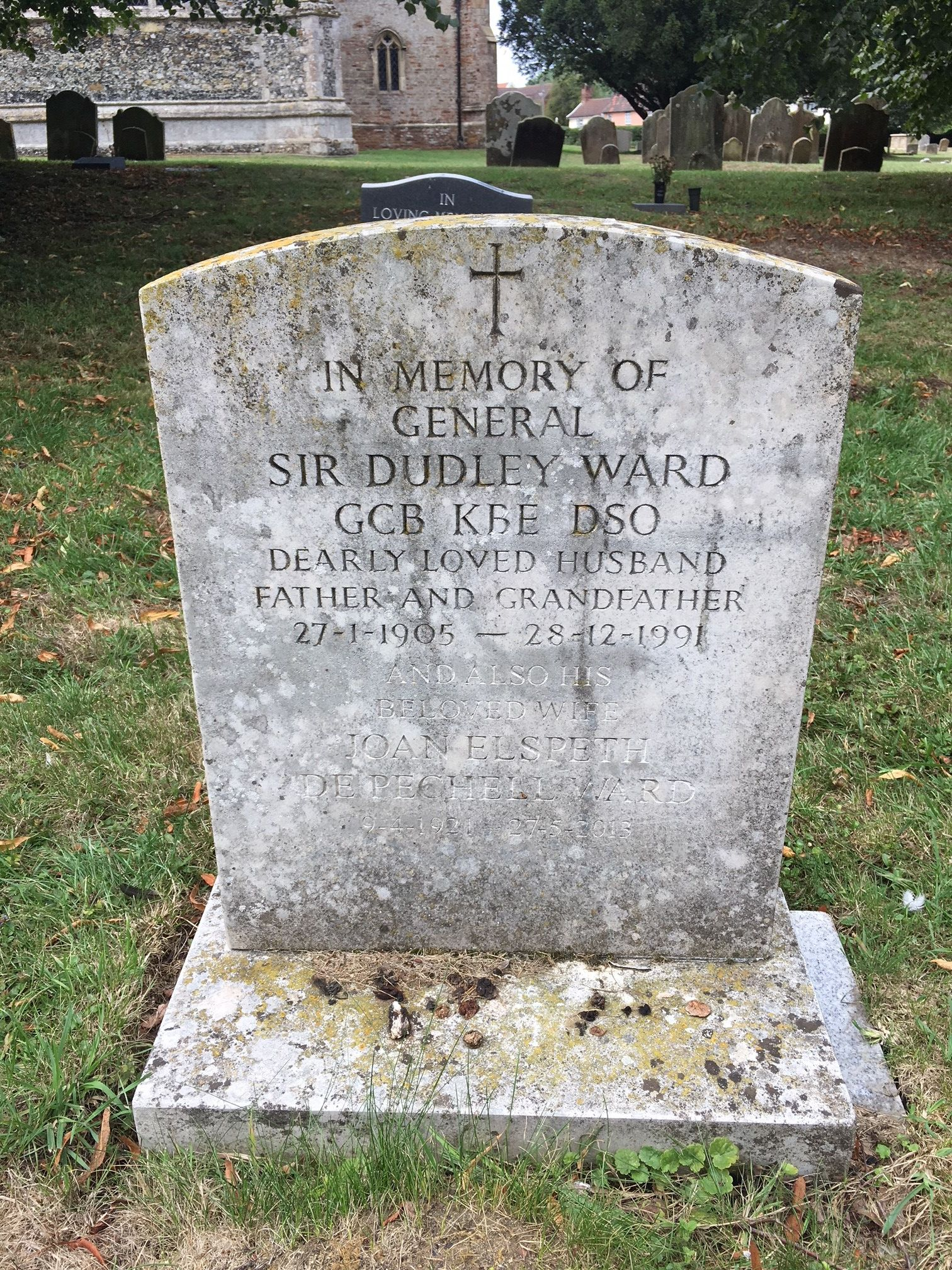
The grave of General Sir Dudley Ward in the churchyard of St Mary's, Dennington, Suffolk.

Ward returned to Germany in January 1957 as Commander-in-Chief of Northern Army Group and the British Army of the Rhine, was promoted to general in February 1957, and held the post until January 1960. He left to become, in May 1960, Commander-in-Chief, British Forces Middle East which was re-designated Near East Command on vacating the appointment in May 1962. He was advanced to Knight Commander of the Order of the Bath in June 1957, which was promoted to Knight Grand Cross of the Order of the Bath in the new year honours list in 1959 and from December 1958 to December 1961, he held the title of Aide-de-Camp General to Queen Elizabeth II.

Ward became Governor and Commander-in-Chief Gibraltar in June 1962, where he presided over the introduction of the 1964 constitution. The Dudley Ward Tunnel is named in his honour. He was also made a knight of the charitable Most Venerable Order of the Hospital of Saint John of Jerusalem in 1962.

Ward retired from the army in 1965. In retirement he served as a Deputy Lieutenant of Suffolk from 1968 until 1984 and, following convention for retired senior officers, he maintained links with the British Army through the honorary positions of Colonel Commandant of the Royal Electrical and Mechanical Engineers and Colonel of the King's Regiment.

== Bibliography ==
- Blaxland, Gregory (1979). Alexander's Generals (the Italian Campaign 1944–1945). London: William Kimber & Co. ISBN 0-7183-0386-5.
- Mead, Richard (2007). Churchill's Lions: A Biographical Guide to the Key British Generals of World War II. Stroud (UK): Spellmount. p. 544 pages. ISBN 978-1-86227-431-0.
- Smart, Nick (2005). Biographical Dictionary of British Generals of the Second World War. Barnsley, UK: Pen & Sword Military. ISBN 1-84415-049-6.

Military offices
Preceded by Hayman Hayman-Joyce	GOC 4th Infantry Division; 1944–1945	Succeeded by Colin Callander
Honorary titles
Preceded by Edward Alban	Colonel of the King's Regiment (Liverpool); 1947–1957	Succeeded by Richard Jones
Military offices
Preceded by Richard Hull	Commandant of the Staff College, Camberley; 1948–1951	Succeeded by Gerald Lathbury
New command	GOC 1st (British) Corps; 1951–1953	Succeeded by Sir James Cassels
Preceded by Sir John Whiteley	Deputy Chief of the Imperial General Staff; 1953–1956	Succeeded by Sir Richard Hull
Preceded by Sir Richard Gale	C-in-C British Army of the Rhine; 1957–1960	Succeeded by Sir James Cassels
Government offices
Preceded by Sir Charles Keightley	Governor of Gibraltar; 1962–1965	Succeeded by Sir Gerald Lathbury
