= John Harding, 1st Baron Harding of Petherton =

British Army officer

Field Marshal The Right Honourable The Lord Harding of Petherton GCB CBE DSO & Two Bars MC
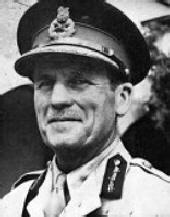
- Born: 10 February 1896; South Petherton, Somerset, England
- Died: 20 January 1989 (aged 92); Nether Compton, Dorset, England
- Burial place: Nether Compton (St. Nicholas) Churchyard, Nether Compton
- Relatives: John Harding (son); Dido Harding (granddaughter)
- Military career
- Allegiance: United Kingdom
- Branch: British Army
- Service years: 1914–1955
- Rank: Field Marshal
- Service number: 12247
- Units: London Regiment; Machine Gun Corps; Somerset Light Infantry
- Commands: Chief of the Imperial General Staff (1952–1955); British Army of the Rhine (1951–1952); Far East Land Forces (1948–1951); Southern Command (1947–1948); XIII Corps (1945); VIII Corps (1943–1944); 7th Armoured Division (1942–1943); 1st Battalion, Somerset Light Infantry (1939–1940)
- Conflicts: First World War; Second World War; Malayan Emergency; Cyprus Emergency
- Awards: Knight Grand Cross of the Order of the Bath; Commander of the Order of the British Empire; Companion of the Distinguished Service Order & Two Bars; Military Cross; Mentioned in Despatches; Commander of the Legion of Merit (United States)

Field Marshal Allan Francis Harding, 1st Baron Harding of Petherton, GCB, CBE, DSO & Two Bars, MC (10 February 1896 – 20 January 1989), known as John Harding, was a senior British Army officer who fought in both the First World War and the Second World War, served in the Malayan Emergency, and later advised the British government on the response to the Mau Mau Uprising. He also served as Chief of the Imperial General Staff (CIGS), the professional head of the British Army, and was Governor of Cyprus from 1955 to 1957 during the Cyprus Emergency. His administration of Cyprus was controversial for its authoritarian treatment of suspected insurgents and civilians.

== Early life and First World War ==
Born the son of Francis Ebenezer Harding and Elizabeth Ellen Harding (née Anstice) and educated at Ilminster Grammar School, Harding started as a boy clerk in December 1911, earning promotion to assistant clerk in the Post Office in July 1913 and then to full clerk in the Second Division of the Civil Service in April 1914.

Harding became a part-time soldier, joining the 11th (County of London) Battalion (Finsbury Rifles) of the London Regiment, a unit of the British Army's Territorial Force, being commissioned as a second lieutenant on 15 May 1914.

During the First World War, Harding was attached to the Machine Gun Corps and fought in the Gallipoli campaign in August 1915. He transferred to the Regular Army as a lieutenant in the Somerset Light Infantry on 22 March 1917 and was assigned to the Middle Eastern theatre of operations. He took part in the Third Battle of Gaza in November 1917 and was subsequently awarded the Military Cross.

== Between the wars ==
During the interwar period, Harding adopted the name "John", which his Regular Army comrades preferred, and in 1919 he was posted to India, serving initially with the 12th Battalion of the MGC before transferring to the 2nd Battalion of the Somerset Light Infantry in July 1921. He was promoted to captain on 11 October 1923 and, after returning to England with his battalion, later attended the Staff College, Camberley from 1928 to 1929. Harding's many fellow students there included Gerald Templer, Gerard Bucknall, Gordon MacMillan, Alexander Galloway, Philip Gregson-Ellis and Richard McCreery while the instructors included men such as Bernard Paget, Richard O'Connor and Bernard Montgomery, the last of whom was destined to make a significant contribution towards Harding's later military career. The course at the Staff College then lasted for two years, with the first year being devoted mainly to staff work at divisional level while the second year, which Harding believed to be a waste of time, studied staff work at the corps and army level.

Harding joined the general staff at headquarters Southern Command in 1930 before becoming brigade major of the 13th Infantry Brigade in 1933. He became a company commander with the 2nd Battalion of the Somerset Light Infantry, with promotion to major on 1 July 1935. After a tour as a staff officer in the Directorate of Operations at the War Office, he was further promoted to lieutenant colonel on 1 January 1938.

== Second World War ==
Harding served in the Second World War, initially as commanding officer of the 1st Battalion, Somerset Light Infantry, in which capacity he served in Waziristan and was mentioned in despatches, before joining the staff of Middle East Command in October 1940 and then becoming a brigadier General Staff (BGS) of the Western Desert Force (WDF) in December. He was appointed a Commander of the Order of the British Empire for services in that role. When Lieutenant Generals Richard O'Connor and Philip Neame were captured in April 1941, Harding took temporary command of the WDF, in which capacity he took the decision to hold Tobruk. He was promoted to the substantive rank of colonel on 9 August 1941 (with seniority backdated to 1 January 1941) and was later appointed a Companion of the Distinguished Service Order (DSO).

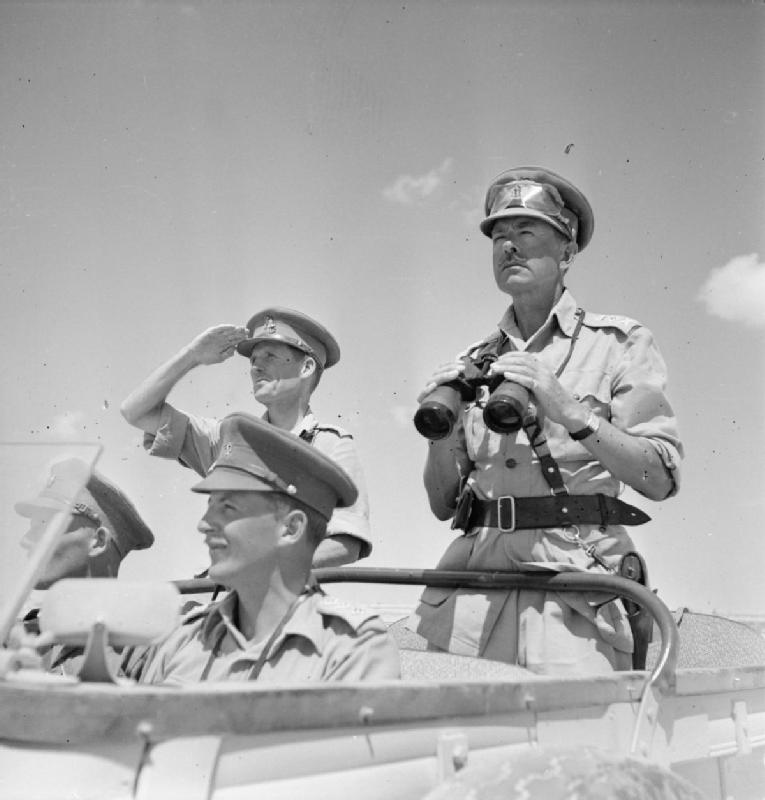
General Sir Harold Alexander, pictured here in August 1942 as Commander-in-Chief, Middle East, surveys the battlefront from an open car. To his right is Major General John Harding with his hand raised.

Harding went on to be appointed BGS of XIII Corps (the new name adopted by the Western Desert Force ) in August 1941. Ηe was mentioned in dispatches in early 1942 and awarded a Bar to his DSO in February 1942. He was promoted to acting major-general on 26 January 1942 and became Deputy Director of Military Training Middle East Command, in which capacity he was again mentioned in despatches in the summer of 1942. He was appointed General Officer Commanding (GOC) of the 7th Armoured Division in September 1942. He led the division in the Second Battle of El Alamein in October–November. He led his forward headquarters from a tank and then a jeep and, during the pursuit of the Axis forces to Tripoli, was subsequently wounded by shell splinters in January 1943. He was awarded a second Bar to his DSO for his conduct in late January 1943. At the same time, his rank of major-general was made temporary.

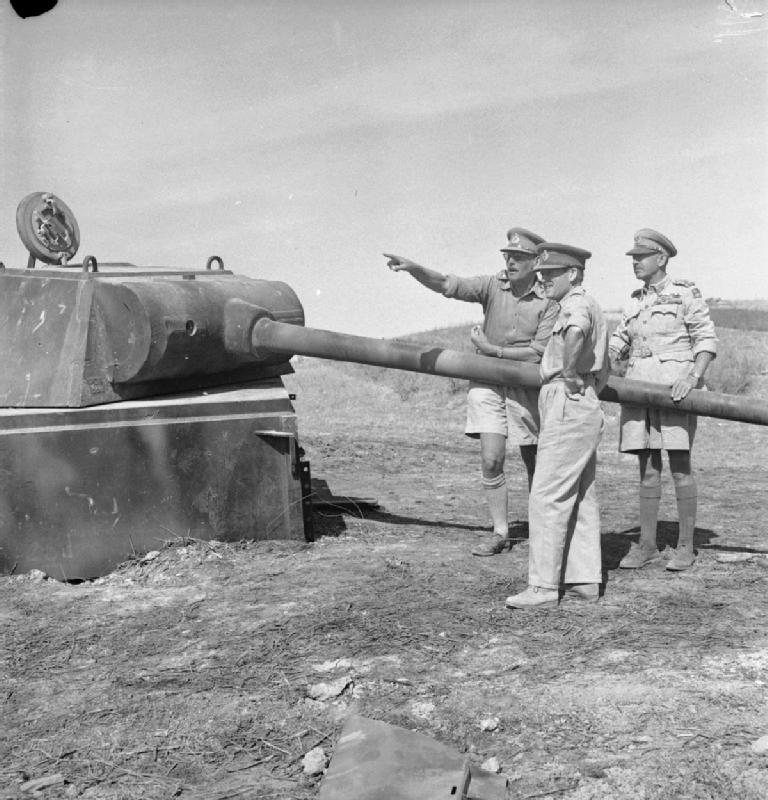
General Sir Harold Alexander (right), with Lieutenant General Sir Oliver Leese and Lieutenant General Sir John Harding, inspect one of the German Panther tank turrets which formed part of the Gothic Line defences, September 1944.

Harding returned to the United Kingdom and, despite having lost three fingers from his left hand, recovered relatively quickly. On 10 November 1943 he was promoted to acting lieutenant general and assumed command of VIII Corps, which was to take part in the invasion of Normandy. Soon afterwards, however, he was posted to the Italian Front in January 1944 to become chief of staff to General Sir Harold Alexander, then commanding the 15th Army Group (later designated the Allied Armies in Italy (AAI) before reverting to 15th Army Group in December 1944). He was appointed a Knight Commander of the Order of the Bath on 16 June 1944 for his service in Italy, and promoted to the substantive rank of major general on 13 July 1944. He played a large part in the planning for Operation Diadem, the fourth Battle of Monte Cassino that led to the capture of Rome and the destruction of a large portion of the Axis forces and the subsequent fighting on the Gothic Line. He went on to take command of XIII Corps in Italy in March 1945, leading it through the Spring 1945 offensive in Italy, arriving in Trieste just after the German surrender in May and the end of World War II in Europe. He was also awarded the Legion of Merit in the Degree of Commander by U.S. President Harry S. Truman for his conduct during the war, on 14 May 1948.

== Post-war career ==
Promoted after the war to lieutenant general on 19 August 1946, Harding succeeded Alexander as commander of British forces in the Mediterranean in November 1946. He became General Officer Commanding-in-Chief (GOC-in-C) Southern Command in July 1947 and went on to be Commander-in-Chief (C-in-C), Far East Land Forces on 28 July 1949 at the early stages of the Malayan Emergency. Having been promoted to full general on 9 December 1949, made Aide-de-Camp General to H.M. The King on 21 October 1950 and advanced to a Knight Grand Cross of the Order of the Bath in the King's Birthday Honours 1951, Harding became Commander-in-Chief of the British Army of the Rhine (BAOR) on 30 August 1951.

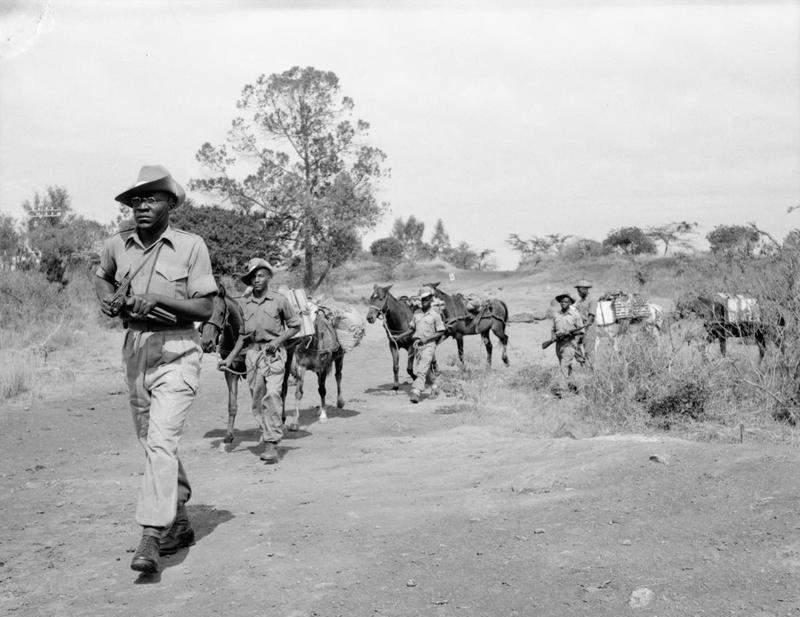
British troops responding to the Mau Mau Uprising in the 1950s.

Harding was appointed Chief of the Imperial General Staff (CIGS) on 1 November 1952: in this capacity he advised the British government on the response to the Mau Mau Uprising. He was promoted to field marshal on 21 July 1953, and retired from the army on 29 September 1955.

Harding was also Colonel of the North Somerset Yeomanry from 2 February 1949, Colonel of the 6th Queen Elizabeth's Own Gurkha Rifles from 18 May 1951 (to 1961), Colonel of the Somerset Light Infantry from 13 April 1953, Colonel of the Life Guards from 26 April 1957 and Colonel of the Somerset and Cornwall Light Infantry from 6 October 1959.

== Cyprus ==
On 25 September 1955, Harding was assigned the post of Governor of the British colony of Cyprus, where he arrived on 3 October of the same year. Harding took strict measures to improve the security situation in Cyprus, EOKA having declared an armed struggle against the British on 1 April 1955. To this end, Harding instituted a number of unprecedented measures including curfews, school closures, the establishment of internment camps, the indefinite detention of suspects without trial and the imposition of capital punishment for offences such as carrying weapons, incendiary devices or any material that could be used in a bomb. A number of such executions took place often in controversial circumstances (e.g. Michalis Karaolis) leading to resentment in Cyprus, Greece and several other countries.

Implementing the policy of the British Government, Harding also attempted to use negotiations to end the Cyprus crisis. However, negotiations with Archbishop Makarios III were unsuccessful and, eventually, Harding exiled Makarios to the British colony of Seychelles. On 21 March 1956 EOKA made an assassination attempt on Harding's life which failed as the time bomb under his bed failed to go off. It was not long after this that Harding offered a reward of £10,000 for General George Grivas, the leader of EOKA.

Facing growing criticism in the United Kingdom about the methods he used and their lack of effectiveness, Harding resigned as Governor of Cyprus on 22 October 1957 and was replaced by Sir Hugh Foot.

== Later career ==
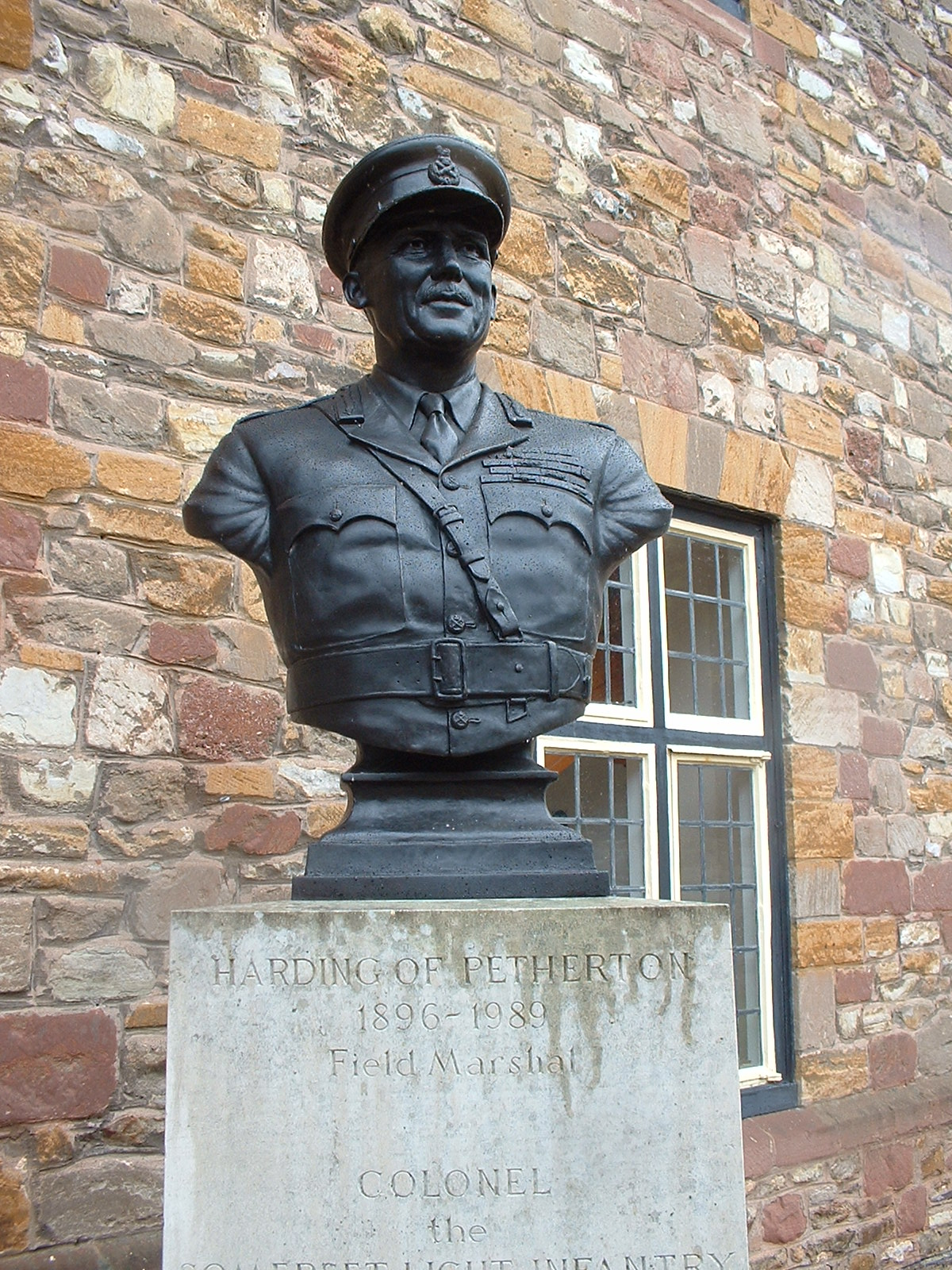
Harding's statue in Taunton, Somerset.

In January 1958, Harding was created Baron Harding of Petherton.

In retirement, he became Non-Executive Chairman of Plessey as well being the first Chairman of the Horse Race Betting Levy Board. His interests included his membership of the Finsbury Rifles Old Comrades Association in which he participated until late in his life.

He died at his home in Nether Compton in Dorset on 20 January 1989, just weeks away from his 93rd birthday. He is buried in the Nether Compton, St Nicholas Church graveyard.

== Family ==
In 1927 Harding married Mary Rooke; they had one son: John Harding, 2nd Baron Harding of Petherton.

== Arms ==
Coat of arms of John Harding, 1st Baron Harding of Petherton
Crest Out of a mural crown Gules a cubit arm in armour the hand gauntleted grasping a field marshal's baton in bend sinister Proper. Escutcheon Argent on a bend Azure between two lions passant guardant Gules as many kukris in saltire Proper between two martlets Or. Supporters Dexter a private of the 1st Life Guards of early nineteenth century; sinister a Somerset Light Infantryman of the late eighteenth century; both habited and accoutred Proper. Motto Vigilant & Resolute

== Bibliography ==
- Carver, Michael (1978). Harding of Petherton: A Biography. Weidenfeld and Nicolson. ISBN 0297775073.
- Grivas, George (1964). The Memoirs of General Grivas edited by Charles Foley. Longmans, London. ASIN B0006DASLW.
- Heathcote, Tony (1999). The British Field Marshals 1736–1997. Barnsley (UK): Pen & Sword. ISBN 0-85052-696-5.
- Holmes, Richard (2011). Soldiers: Army Lives and Loyalties from Redcoats to Dusty Warriors. London: Harper Press. ISBN 978-0-00-722570-5.
- Mead, Richard (2007). Churchill's Lions: A Biographical Guide to the Key British Generals of World War II. Stroud: Spellmount. ISBN 978-1-86227-431-0.

Military offices
Preceded by James Renton	GOC 7th Armoured Division; 1942–1943	Succeeded by George Erskine
Preceded by Richard McCreery	GOC VIII Corps; 1943–1944	Succeeded by Richard O'Connor
Preceded by Sidney Kirkman	GOC XIII Corps; March – May 1945	Post disbanded
Preceded by Sir John Crocker	GOC-in-C Southern Command; 1947–1948	Succeeded by Sir Ouvry Roberts
Preceded by Sir Neil Ritchie	C-in-C Far East Land Forces; 1948–1951	Succeeded by Sir Charles Keightley
Preceded by Sir Charles Keightley	C-in-C British Army of the Rhine; 1951–1952	Succeeded by Sir Richard Gale
Preceded by Sir William Slim	Chief of the Imperial General Staff; 1952–1955	Succeeded by Sir Gerald Templer
Government offices
Preceded by Sir Robert Armitage	Governor of Cyprus; 1955–1957	Succeeded by Sir Hugh Foot
Peerage of the United Kingdom
New title	Baron Harding of Petherton; 1958–1989	Succeeded by John Harding
