= Petherton =

Petherton is part of the name of two places in Somerset, England:

- North Petherton, town in Sedgemoor
- South Petherton, village in South Somerset

== See also ==
- Baron Harding of Petherton, title in the Peerage of the United Kingdom
