= Alexander Galloway =

Lieutenant-General Sir Alexander Galloway KBE CB DSO MC
- Born: 3 November 1895; Minto, near Hawick, Scotland
- Died: 28 January 1977 (aged 81); Norham, Northumberland, England
- Military career
- Allegiance: United Kingdom
- Branch: British Army
- Service years: 1914–1950
- Rank: Lieutenant-General
- Nickname: "Sandy"
- Service number: 6852
- Unit: Cameronians (Scottish Rifles)
- Commands: British Troops Austria; Malaya Command; XXX Corps; 4th Indian Infantry Division; 1st Armoured Division; 23rd Infantry Brigade; Staff College, Haifa; 1st Battalion, Cameronians (Scottish Rifles)
- Conflicts: First World War; Second World War
- Awards: Knight Commander of the Order of the British Empire; Companion of the Order of the Bath; Distinguished Service Order; Military Cross; Mentioned in Despatches (3); War Cross (Greece); Knight Grand Officer of the Order of Orange Nassau with Swords (Netherlands); Military Order of the White Lion (Czechoslovakia); War Cross (Czechoslovakia); Order of Merit 1st Class (Czechoslovakia)

Lieutenant-General Sir Alexander Galloway, KBE, CB, DSO, MC (3 November 1895 – 28 January 1977) was a senior British Army officer. During the Second World War, he was particularly highly regarded as a staff officer and, as such, had an influential role in the outcome of Operation Crusader during the Western Desert Campaign in late 1941. He later commanded the 4th Indian Infantry Division at the Battle of Monte Cassino during the Italian Campaign in early 1944.

== Early life and military career ==
Born in Minto, near Hawick, Scotland on 3 November 1895, the son of a Church of Scotland minister, Alexander Galloway was educated at King William's College. On the outbreak of the First World War in August 1914 Galloway volunteered for the British Army and was commissioned as a second lieutenant into the Cameronians (Scottish Rifles) but was then posted on 8 October 1914 to the 1/4th Battalion, King's Own Scottish Borderers, a Territorial Force unit, part of the 156th (Scottish Rifles) Brigade of the 52nd (Lowland) Division. He was promoted to lieutenant in May 1915, and saw action at Gallipoli, in Egypt and Palestine, and on the Western Front. In 1917, he gained a commission in the Regular Army, returned to the Scottish Rifles, and was promoted to captain in July. He was awarded the Military Cross (MC) in 1918.

== Between the wars ==
Remaining in the British Army during the interwar period, Galloway had a number of regimental and staff jobs, serving from 1925 to 1926 as adjutant to the 2nd Battalion, Cameronians. He attended the Staff College, Camberley for a year from January 1928 and graduated in December 1929. His fellow students there included several future general officers such as Richard McCreery, Gerald Templer, John Harding, Gerard Bucknall, William Holmes, Philip Gregson-Ellis, Gordon MacMillan and I. S. O. Playfair. His appointment after graduating was as including appointments as staff captain at HQ Cairo in February 1930 and also as brigade major of the Canal Brigade in Egypt from February 1932. He returned to the Staff College, Camberley in February 1937 July 1938 as an instructor, and several of his fellow instructors would rise to prominence in the war.

Galloway was promoted to major in December 1933 (having previously been made brevet major) and was made brevet lieutenant-colonel in January 1935. His promotion to lieutenant-colonel came on completing his period instructing at the Staff College in 1938.

== Second World War ==
At the outbreak of the Second World War Galloway was commanding the 1st Battalion The Cameronians. In February 1940 he was selected to command, in the rank of acting brigadier, the new Staff College at Haifa in Palestine. In August he was appointed chief staff officer (BGS – Brigadier-General Staff) to Lieutenant-General Henry Maitland Wilson's HQ British Troops Egypt. Wilson lent Galloway to Richard O'Connor, commander of the Western Desert Force to help in the planning of Operation Compass. His substantive rank was advanced to full colonel in December 1940.

In early 1941, while still Wilson's BGS, Galloway traveled to Greece (with a pause in Crete where, between 19 February and 7 March, he assumed temporary command of forces on the island) where Wilson was to assume command of 'W Force', the Commonwealth Expeditionary force that arrived during March and April. Overwhelmed by superior German forces in the Battle of Greece, the expeditionary force was forced to evacuate the Greek mainland by the end of April and Galloway returned to Cairo to take command of the 23rd Infantry Brigade, which was in the process of reforming. Galloway was appointed a Commander of the Order of the British Empire in July.

Although sent as part of 6th Infantry Division to reinforce Australian I Corps fighting in the Syria-Lebanon Campaign, the brigade saw no action and by September Galloway was back in Cairo to take up the appointment as BGS to Alan Cunningham, the commander of the newly formed Eighth Army. On 23 November, during Operation Crusader, learning that the British armour had been heavily defeated by the tanks of Erwin Rommel's Africa Corps, Cunningham drafted orders to discontinue the offensive and withdraw his forces. Galloway, on his own initiative, delayed issuing the orders and contacted Cairo to suggest that Claude Auchinleck, the Commander-in-Chief Middle East Command, should come forward to review the situation personally. In the meantime, Galloway discussed the situation with Cunningham's two corps commanders and learned that both Willoughby Norrie (XXX Corps) and Reade Godwin-Austen (XIII Corps) felt the offensive should be continued. These views Galloway passed on during the subsequent conference with Auchinleck at Eighth Army HQ. Consequently, Auchinleck ordered Cunningham to continue the offensive. Although Rommel's "dash to the wire", an attempt to sever Eighth Army's lines of supply, caused alarm and confusion in Eighth Army's rear echelon, Rommel's armour was held at the Libyan border with Egypt by the artillery of 4th Indian Infantry Division and then forced to retrace its steps as a result of lack of supply. Eighth Army thus regained the initiative and by January had pushed the Axis forces out of Cyrenaica.

During Crusader on 27 November 1941, Galloway was promoted acting major-general, to become Deputy Chief of the General Staff (DCGS) at GHQ Middle East. He replaced Neil Ritchie, who had assumed command of Eighth Army. In recognition of his efforts in North Africa, Galloway was awarded the Distinguished Service Order and Mentioned in Despatches in December. In his new role Galloway spent some time in the United States selecting equipment for the Eighth Army before returning to London in May 1942 to take up the important role of Director of Staff Duties at the War Office. His rank was upgraded from an acting one to a temporary one in December 1942 and, in July 1943, he was appointed to command 1st Armoured Division which was re-fitting in North Africa having fought through the North Africa campaign since the Battle of Gazala the year before.

During the division's period of re-fitting and training in North Africa Galloway's rank of major-general was made substantive in December 1943 and then in March 1944 he had an interlude in Italy when Major General Francis Tuker, the commander of the 4th Indian Infantry Division, which was in the front line at Cassino fell ill. Galloway arrived to take temporary command on 8 March 1944, in time for the Third Battle of Monte Cassino. In ten days of desperate fighting the Germans succeeded in holding the Allied attack and by 25 March the effort was called off. Galloway's division had to be withdrawn, having sustained some 3,000 casualties during its time at Cassino, and Galloway returned to 1st Armoured Division.

In May 1944 1st Armoured Division was moved to Italy but Galloway saw no action with his division as, in poor health as a result of his time at Cassino, he was shipped back to the UK in mid-August to recuperate. In early 1945, returned to good health, Galloway spent a month in command of 3rd Infantry Division while Lashmer Whistler took leave.

During the winter of 1944/45 the Germans, responding to civil disobedience in the Netherlands, closed the canals thus preventing the distribution of food and fuel. A District HQ was set up under Galloway who together with Gerald Templer, 21st Army Group's Director of Civil Affairs and Military Government, and George Clark, SHAEF representative to the Dutch Government, organised transport and the stockpiling of supplies to relieve the starving population when the military situation permitted. In March Canadian First Army pushed into the Netherlands with Galloway's organisation following. In mid-April a truce was agreed with the German occupying forces allowing relief supplies to be carried to the occupied zones (which happened to be the most highly populated regions of the country) by air (Operation Manna) and road (Operation Faust).

== Post war ==
At the end of the war Galloway was appointed Chief of Staff of 21st Army Group, replacing the exhausted Freddie de Guingand. In December 1945 he was promoted acting lieutenant-general to command XXX Corps. He was also appointed a Companion of the Order of the Bath in the 1946 New Year Honours.

Galloway was Commander-in-Chief Malaya Command from 1946 to 1947, and British High Commissioner and Commander-in-Chief British Troops Austria from October 1947 to 21 January 1950. His lieutenant-general rank was made permanent in March 1947 (with seniority backdated to December 1944), and he was knighted as a Knight Commander of the Order of the British Empire in 1949. Galloway retired from the army 17 February 1950.

In July 1951, Galloway was appointed director of the United Nations Relief and Works Agency (UNRWA) in Jordan. Galloway was unusually blunt for one in a diplomatic role, which created friction between his office and the host government, and with the British Legation in Amman. The legation's annual report for 1951 emphasized the deteriorating economy and the transformation of Jordanian politics in the aftermath of Abdullah's assassination. With regard to Palestinian refugees the report notes efforts to reduce ration rolls and the attempts to persuade refugees to 'build protection against the coming winter' were 'interpreted by the refugees as resettlement outside of Palestine and a surrender of the right to return.'

According to an unverified yet testimony by Reverend Karl Baehr, Executive Secretary of the American Christian Palestine Committee, made in 1953 during the Hearings Before the Subcommittee on the Near East and Africa of the Committee on Foreign Relations, Galloway made in 1952 a statement to a group of visiting American church leaders regarding the problem of Arab refugees arising from the 1948 Israeli-Arab War:

It is perfectly clear than the Arab nations do not want to solve the Arab refugee problem. They want to keep it as an open sore, as an affront against the United Nations and as a weapon against Israel. Arab leaders don’t give a damn whether the refugees live or die.

Successive retelling of this quote over the intervening years has resulted in some instances of Galloway's identity being lost and the quote erroneously attributed to a (non-existent) UNRWA employee, "Ralph Galloway".

In an op-ed in the same year Galloway was even more blunt about UNRWA: "Staff begets more staff. Plan follows plan. Typewriters click. Brochures and statistics pour out. The refugees remain and eat, and complain and breed; while a game of political 'last touch' goes on between the local governments and the director, UNRWA". He went on to say: "There is need to distinguish between a tempting political maneuver and the hard, unpalatable fact that the refugees cannot in the foreseeable future return to their homes in Palestine. To get this acceptance is a matter of politics: It is beyond the function of UNRWA." For this statement, Galloway was fired at the demand of the Jordanian government.

Galloway's formal employment with UNRWA ended on 30 June 1952. But that was not to be the end of his association with the Arab refugee problem. On Friday 29 August 1952 Galloway published a piece in the conservative Daily Telegraph and Morning Post entitled 'What Can be Done About the Arab Refugees?' He was characteristically direct:

The Arab Governments dislike UNRWA and mistrust it. They know, of course, that without the relief programme there would soon be chaos among the refugees. There is some criticism of relief, which is understandable, and much criticism of the slow pace of resettlement. The Jordanian population fear the settlement of large numbers of refugees in their country. But they are aware that it means the spending of large sums of money in Jordan. They want the cash. They want to spend it on schemes for the development of Jordan. If the refugees benefit from this arrangement, so much the better."

Galloway continued in critical vein covering not only Arab states but also the UNRWA itself as well as the refugees. He concluded:

There is a need of a change of heart and a better atmosphere. There is need to distinguish between a tempting political manoeuvre and the hard, unpalatable fact that the refugees cannot in the foreseeable future return to their homes in Palestine. To get this acceptance is a matter of politics: it is beyond the function of UNRWA. Second, a determined effort should be made to get the 'host' countries to take over relief from the Agency, thus freeing it to get on with the much more important task of resettlement.

In 1954 Galloway assumed a position as a public relations director and manager for the Costain engineering and construction firm and retired in 1964. He and his wife moved to Scotland in 1965 and he died in 1977.

== Personal ==
Galloway married Dorothy Haddon White in 1920, with whom he had three sons.

== Bibliography ==
- Mead, Richard (2007). Churchill's Lions: a biographical guide to the key British generals of World War II. Stroud: Spellmount. ISBN 978-1-86227-431-0.
- Smart, Nick (2005). Biographical Dictionary of British Generals of the Second World War. Barnsley, South Yorkshire: Pen and Sword Books. ISBN 1844150496.

Military offices
Preceded by Raymond Briggs	GOC 1st Armoured Division; 1943–1944	Succeeded by Richard Hull
Preceded by Francis Tuker	GOC 4th Indian Infantry Division; March 1944	Succeeded by Arthur Holworthy
Preceded by Brian Horrocks	GOC XXX Corps; 1945–1946	Post disbanded
Preceded by Sir Frank Messervy	GOC Malaya Command; 1946–1947	Succeeded by Ashton Wade
