= Richard Hull =

British Army general (1907–1989)

Field Marshal Sir Richard Hull KG GCB DSO DL
- Hull as a general, 1962
- Born: 7 May 1907; Cosham, Hampshire, England
- Died: 17 September 1989 (aged 82); Pinhoe, Devon, England
- Burial place: St. Michael and All Angels Cemetery, Pinhoe, Devon, England
- Relatives: Sir Charles Hull (father)
- Military career
- Allegiance: United Kingdom
- Branch: British Army
- Service years: 1926–1967
- Rank: Field Marshal
- Service number: 36442
- Unit: 17th/21st Lancers
- Commands: Chief of the Defence Staff (1965–1967); Chief of the General Staff (1961–1965); Far East Land Forces (1958–1961); British Troops in Egypt (1954–1956); Staff College, Camberley (1946–1948); 5th Infantry Division (1944–1946); 1st Armoured Division (1944); 26th Armoured Brigade (1943); 12th Infantry Brigade (1943); 17th/21st Lancers (1941–1942)
- Conflicts: Second World War; Indonesia–Malaysia confrontation
- Awards: Knight Companion of the Order of the Garter; Knight Grand Cross of the Order of the Bath; Companion of the Distinguished Service Order; Mentioned in Despatches
- Other work: Constable of the Tower of London (1970–1975)

Field Marshal Sir Richard Amyatt Hull (7 May 1907 – 17 September 1989) was a senior British Army officer. He was the last Chief of the Imperial General Staff (CIGS), holding the post from 1961 to 1964, and the first Chief of the General Staff (CGS), holding that post until 1965, and, as such, was the professional head of the British Army. He later became Chief of the Defence Staff (CDS) from 1965 to 1967, the professional head of the entire British Armed Forces. He served with distinction during the Second World War, fighting from 1942 to 1945 in North Africa, Italy and Western Europe, became the youngest divisional commander in the British Army, and, after the war was over, he advised the British government on the response to the Indonesia–Malaysia confrontation in the 1960s.

== Early life and military career ==
Richard Amyatt Hull was born in Cosham, Hampshire on 7 May 1907, the son of Major-General Sir Charles Hull, and Muriel Helen Hull (née Dobell), and was educated at Charterhouse School and Trinity College, Cambridge. Hull entered the Royal Military College, Sandhurst and was commissioned as a second lieutenant into the 17th/21st Lancers, a cavalry regiment of the British Army, on 1 November 1926. Posted with his regiment to Egypt in October 1928, he was promoted to lieutenant on 7 May 1931 and to captain on 1 June 1933 before going on to India in October of that year. He served as adjutant of his regiment when it was converted into a mechanised role and, from 1938 to 1939, he attended the Staff College, Quetta.

== Second World War ==
By the time of the outbreak of the Second World War in September 1939, Hull had just returned from India. After serving in the Directorate of Staff Duties at the War Office from February 1940, Hull was appointed officer commanding (OC) 'C' Squadron of his regiment, which had also by now returned from India to the United Kingdom, in March 1941 and then, five months later, became the regiment's commanding officer (CO). He remained in this capacity until June 1942 when he became GSO1 of the 1st Canadian Armoured Division, which was soon redesignated the 5th Canadian (Armoured) Division. The regiment had been serving as part of the 26th Armoured Brigade of the 6th Armoured Division since the division's formation in September 1940. The division's first general officer commanding (GOC) was Major-General John Crocker, passing briefly to Major-General Herbert Lumsden and then Charles Gairdner, before, in May 1942, finally passing to Major-General Charles Keightley, who, like Hull, was a fellow cavalryman.

=== North Africa ===
In the days leading up to Operation Torch, the Allied invasion of North Africa, for which the 6th Armoured Division was to take part in as part of the British First Army, Hull was promoted to colonel and became second-in-command (2IC) of the 26th Armoured Brigade. Elements of the First Army landed in North Africa on 8 November 1942, with Hull's regiment being among them. A week later, shortly after landing, Hull was ordered to form Blade Force, based around the 17th/21st Lancers, along with part of the 1st Derbyshire Yeomanry (the 6th Armoured Division's reconnaissance regiment) and anti-tank and anti-aircraft guns, and to capture Tunis as soon as possible (see the run for Tunis). Sending his units by train to Constantine, he arrived there on the evening of 16 November, and, the following day, was on the border of Tunisia. Hull then headed towards Medjez el Bab, which was held by the French against the Germans. The armoured cars of the 1st Derbyshire Yeomanry arrived on 18 November, with the rest of Blade Force arriving soon after, but, lacking infantry support, were unable to capture the bridge.

Hull, with the 36th Infantry Brigade on his left flank, and the 11th Infantry Brigade (both from Major-General Vyvyan Evelegh's 78th "Battleaxe" Division) on his right flank, now decided to turn west, hoping to get to Tunis by a more northern route, with the aid of elements of the U.S. 1st Armored Division. However, this attempt also failed as the Germans had received reinforcements and, by the end of the month, the Allies were on the defensive and forced to withdraw from their positions. In December Blade Force was reabsorbed into the 6th Armoured Division, Hull returning to the 2IC of the 26th Armoured Brigade. For his services in the early stages of the Tunisian campaign Hull was appointed a Companion of the Distinguished Service Order on 11 February 1943.

By February 1943, the brigade was at Thala. In the middle of the month the Germans launched their attack at Kasserine Pass against US troops, forcing them to retreat. Lieutenant-General Kenneth Anderson, GOC of the British First Army, appointed Brigadier Cameron Nicholson, 2IC of the 6th Armoured Division, gave him command of Nickforce, an improvised formation. Nickforce held on until further reinforcements and fought the Germans to a standstill.

Hull was then promoted to brigadier and took command of the 12th Infantry Brigade, part of the 4th Mixed Division (which was composed of the 10th and 12th Infantry Brigades and the 21st Tank Brigade), then commanded by Major-General John Hawkesworth, which had arrived in Tunisia the month before, on 17 April. The brigade was heavy fighting just a week after Hull's assumption of command, where it was involved in taking a key position named Peter's Corner which, despite air and infantry tank support from the 21st Tank Brigade, failed with some 900 casualties, with the Germans putting up a tenacious resistance. Hull's brigade was relieved by the 78th Division's 11th Brigade soon afterwards and, due to its heavy losses, only managed to play a relatively minor role in the First Army's capture of Tunis, which fell on 6 May 1943, the campaign in Tunisia itself coming to an end a week later with the surrender of almost 250,000 Axis troops.

Over a month later, on 19 June Hull returned to the 6th Armoured Division, still commanded by Keightley, where he took over command of the 26th Armoured Brigade from Brigadier Philip Roberts, which was then training in North Africa for operations in Italy, before returning to the United Kingdom, becoming Deputy Director of Staff Duties (DDSD) at the War Office, in December 1943. The appointment was an important department within the General Staff and was responsible for staff training and for the organisation of the army in general. Soon after taking up this position, Hull was, in late January 1944, mentioned in despatches for his services in North Africa.

=== Italy ===
Hull remained in this post until August 1944 when, promoted to major-general, he succeeded Major-General Alexander Galloway as GOC of the 1st Armoured Division, then serving on the Italian front, making Hull the youngest divisional commander in the British Army during the Second World War. The division, a pre-war Regular Army formation, was composed of the 2nd Armoured and 18th Lorried Infantry Brigades along with supporting units, and was a veteran of the British Eighth Army that had fought throughout most of the North African campaign and briefly with the First Army in the final stages of the campaign in Tunisia but, since then, had seen no action, with tanks being considered unsuitable in the mountains of Italy. The division was assigned to V Corps, commanded by Lieutenant-General Charles Keightley (who, formerly as Hull's superior as GOC 6th Armoured Division, had been the one to recommend Hull for command of the 1st Armoured Division), with I Canadian Corps and II Polish Corps on its right, next to the Adriatic Sea. The Eighth Army commander, Lieutenant-General Sir Oliver Leese (who had taught Hull at the Staff College, Quetta before the war), intended to launch an offensive to breach the Gothic Line, believing he could reach the Po Valley. The operation, codenamed Olive, began on the night of 25 August, with the 1st Armoured held in reserve. Keightley, the corps commander, planned for the 46th Division, under Major-General John Hawkesworth, to breach the German defences, allowing Hull's division to exploit its success and drive on to the Po Valley.

The 46th Division's progress was initially successful and Keightley decided to bring the 1st Armoured earlier than planned, although the division was, curiously, held back 100 miles from the enemy and, by the time it reached the front, was exhausted. However, on 3 September, the division was committed to battle around the town of Coriano and suffered heavy losses before it was repelled. Reinforced with the 43rd Gurkha Lorried Brigade and a Canadian brigade, the division tried again on 12 September, this time with more success, and the Germans fell back before again halting the division a week later, inflicting heavy losses on Hull's division, particularly in tanks.

On 24 September, however, the division received the news that it was to be disbanded, due to a severe manpower shortage that was afflicting the British Army at this stage of the war, particularly in Italy. As a result of this news, the division ceased to exist by late October, although it was not officially disbanded until 1 January 1945 and the 2nd Armoured Brigade survived as an independent formation, although the 18th Brigade was broken up and the men sent to bring up other units, mainly the 46th Division, which had suffered heavy casualties, up to strength.

=== Northwest Europe ===
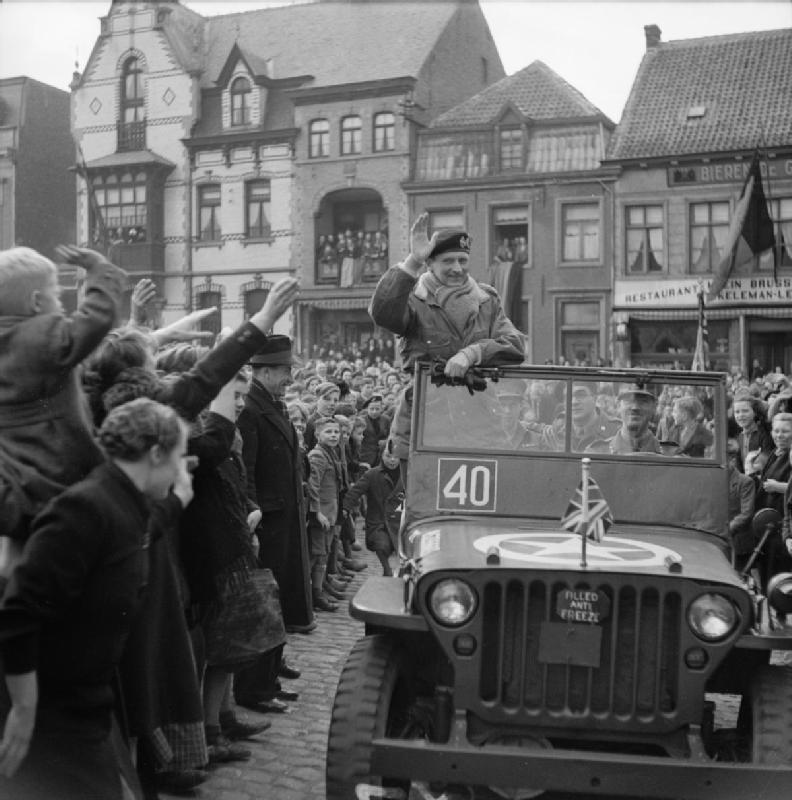
Field Marshal Sir Bernard Montgomery acknowledges the cheers of Belgian civilians during a tour of 5th Division in and around Ghent, 20 March 1945. Driving the car is Major-General Richard Hull, GOC of the 5th Division.

Following the 1st Armoured Division's disbandment, in late November, Hull succeeded Major-General Philip Gregson-Ellis as GOC of the 5th Infantry Division, another Regular Army formation, then serving in Palestine. Composed of the 13th, 15th and 17th Infantry Brigades, along with supporting divisional troops, the 5th Division, nicknamed "The Globe Trotters" (after having served in nearly every theatre of war), had fought in Sicily and Italy from July 1943 until July 1944 and was resting in Palestine, and was then preparing to return to Italy.

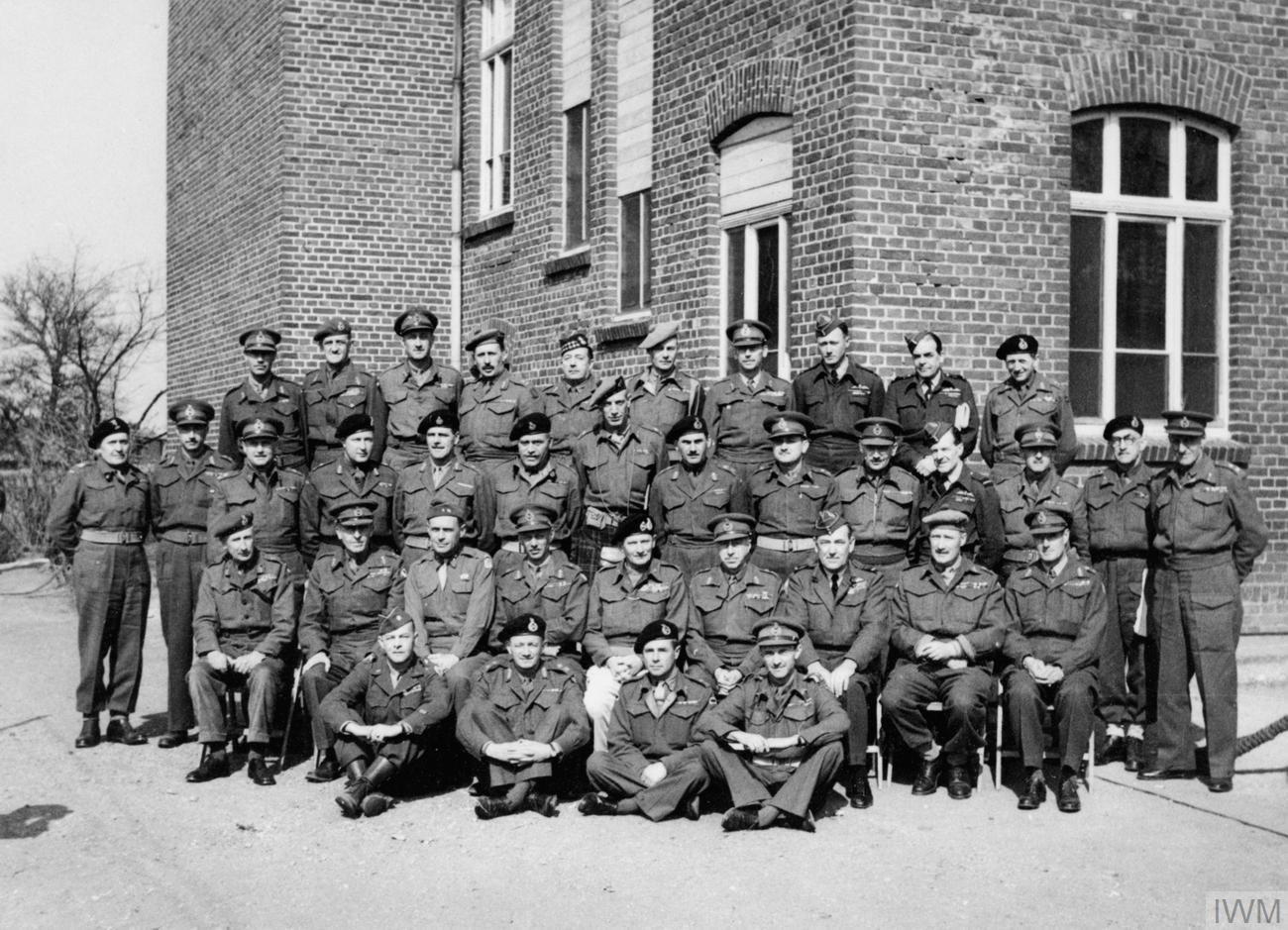
Field Marshal Sir Bernard Montgomery poses for a group photograph with his staff and army, corps and divisional commanders at Walbeck, Germany, 22 March 1945. Pictured standing in the back row, on the far left, is Major-General Richard Hull.

Originally intending to rejoin the Eighth Army in Italy, the 5th Division, after landing there briefly in February, was instead diverted to Northwestern Europe as part of Operation Goldflake to reinforce the British Second Army, commanded by Lieutenant-General Sir Miles Dempsey, for the final Allied offensive on the Western Front, the invasion of Germany itself. The Second Army formed part of Field Marshal Sir Bernard Montgomery's 21st Army Group. The division arrived in Belgium in early March, and on 17 April was assigned to Lieutenant-General Evelyn Barker's VIII Corps, then just a few miles from the western bank of the Elbe river. The division crossed the river after facing light resistance and was not involved in much fighting thereafter and managed to enter the city of Lübeck in Northern Germany on 3 May, just a few days before the end of World War II in Europe. Having been promoted to the substantive rank of major on 7 May 1945, Hull was appointed a Companion of the Order of the Bath on 5 July 1945.

Shortly after the war in Europe came to an end, it was proposed that Hull would exchange places with Major-General Lashmer "Bolo" Whistler, GOC of the 3rd Infantry Division, and take the division to the Far East to fight the Japanese, with Whistler becoming GOC of the 5th Division in Hull's place. However, the surrender of Japan in September 1945 cancelled these plans and Hull remained with the 5th Division on occupation duties in Germany until May 1946.

== Postwar ==
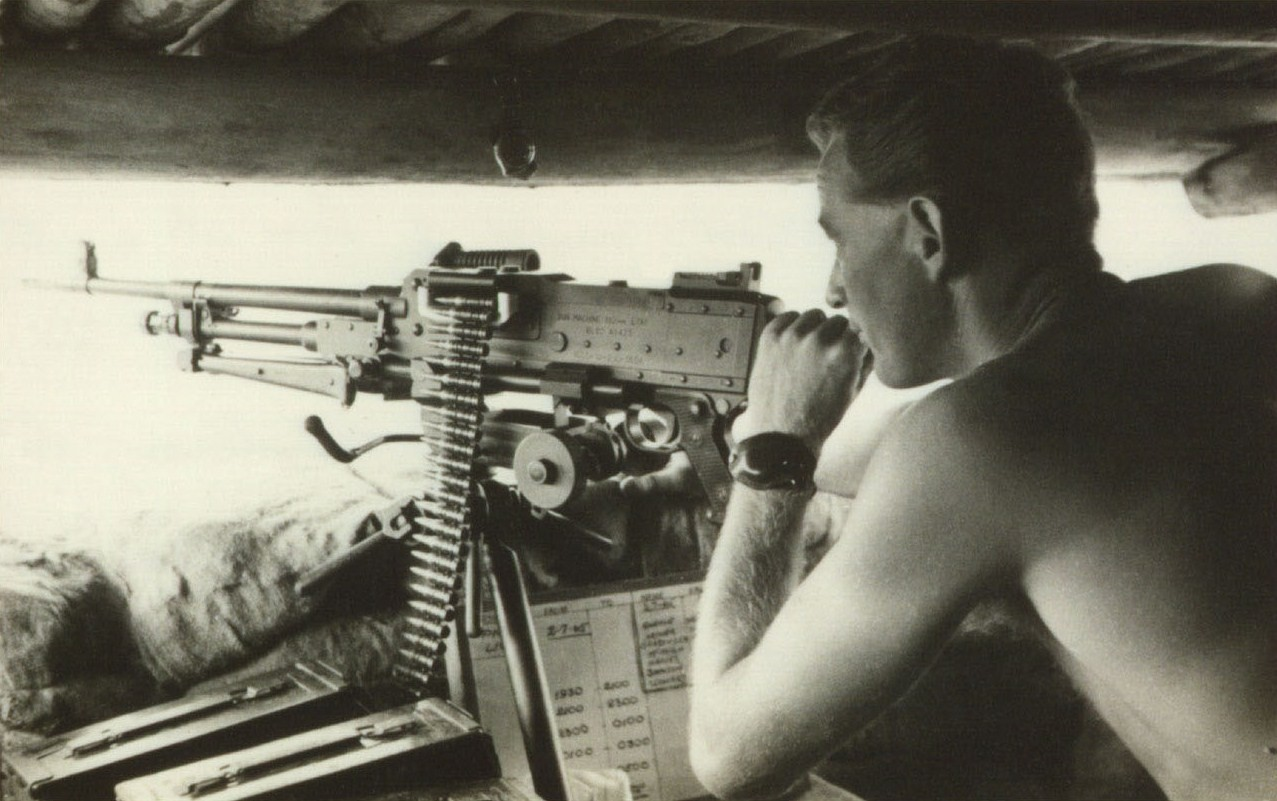
An Australian soldier in action during the Indonesia–Malaysia confrontation.

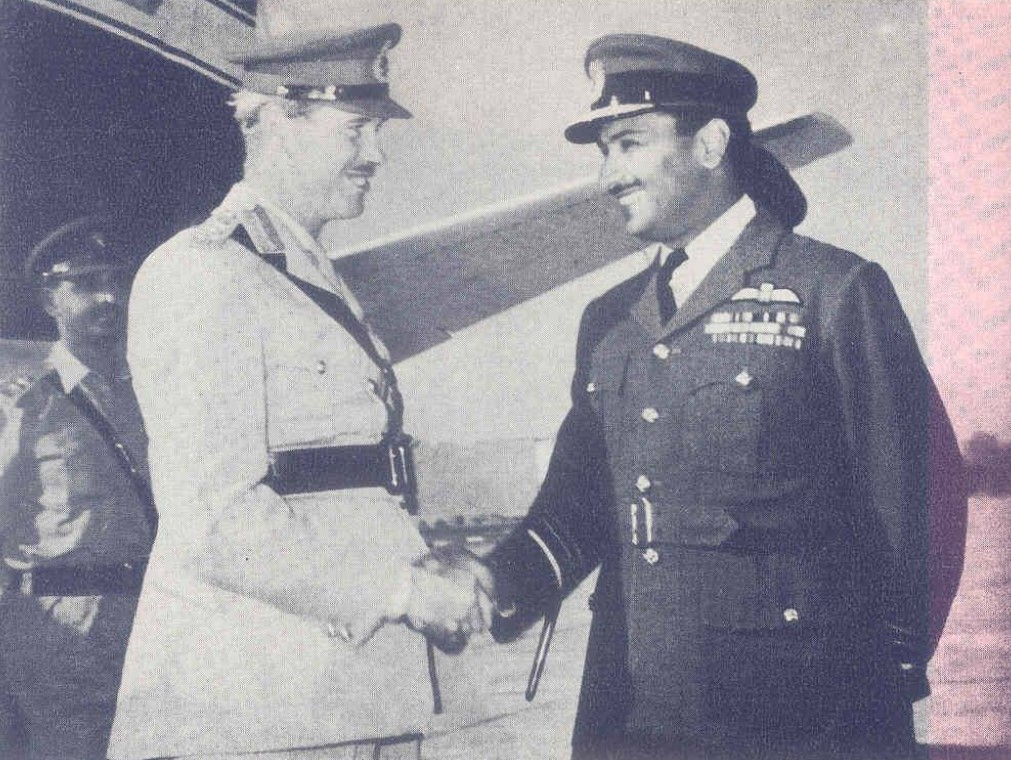
General Sir Richard Hull arrives at PAF Station Peshawar, greeted by Air Marshal Asghar Khan, 13 March 1963.

Promoted to colonel on 13 April 1946, he again succeeded Major-General Philip Gregson-Ellis, this time as Commandant of the Staff College, Camberley in May 1946, an assignment appointed to only the most promising officers. Having been promoted again to major-general on 13 June 1947, he became Director of Staff Duties at the War Office in September 1948 and Chief Army Instructor at the Imperial Defence College on 1 January 1951. He became chief of staff at headquarters Middle East Land Forces on 26 January 1953. He was appointed GOC British Troops in Egypt on 15 June 1954 and, having been promoted to lieutenant-general on 29 September 1954 and advanced to a Knight Commander of the Order of the Bath in the New Year Honours 1956, he became Deputy Chief of the Imperial General Staff on 5 October 1956. He was appointed Commander-in-Chief Far East Land Forces on 25 June 1958 and, having been promoted to full general on 13 February 1959, and advanced to Knight Grand Cross of the Order of the Bath in the Queen's Birthday Honours 1961.

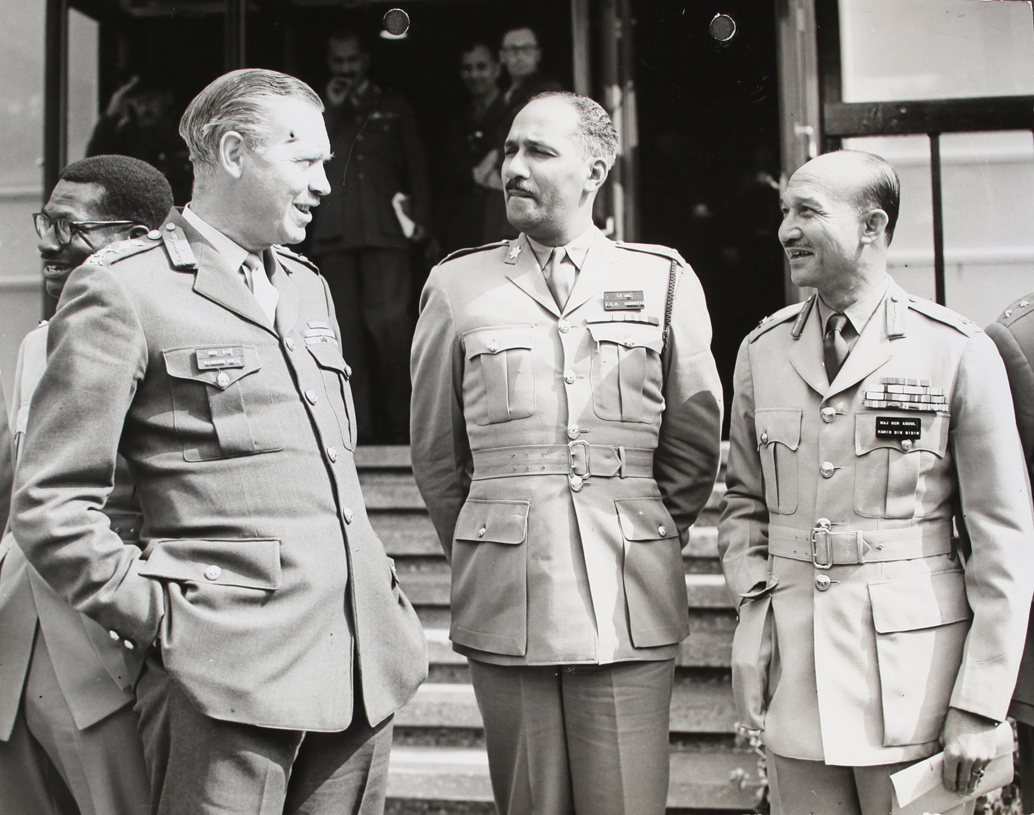
Hull (left), talking with Lieutenant Colonel J. C. H. Serette of Trinidad & Tobago (centre) and Major General Abdul Hamid Bin Bidin of Malaysia, 1964.

Hull became Chief of the Imperial General Staff on 1 November 1961 (restyled Chief of the General Staff in April 1964). In this capacity he advised the British government on the response to the Indonesia–Malaysia confrontation. Having been promoted to field marshal on 8 February 1965, he was appointed Chief of the Defence Staff, the professional head of the British Armed Forces, on 16 July 1965. He finally retired from the British Army on 5 August 1967. He was also appointed Colonel of the 17th/21st Lancers from July 1947, Honorary Colonel of the Cambridge University Contingent from 30 May 1958 and Colonel Commandant of the Royal Armoured Corps from April 1968.

In retirement he became a Non-Executive Director of Whitbread. He was appointed Constable of the Tower of London from 1 August 1970, Lord Lieutenant of Devon from 5 October 1978 and a Knight Companion of the Order of the Garter on 23 April 1980.

His interests included shooting, fly fishing and gardening; he knew every plant in his garden by their English, Latin and local name. He died of cancer at his home, Beacon Downe in Pinhoe, on 17 September 1989, at the age of 82.

== Family ==
In 1934 he married Antoinette Labouchére de Rougement; they had a son and two daughters.

== Coat of Arms ==
Coat of arms of Field Marshal Sir Richard Hull, KG, GCB, DSO, DL
Crest On a mount charged with a trout a raven close holding in its dexter claw a Field Marshal's baton all proper. Escutcheon Azure a cross couped between four talbots' heads erased Argent. Motto SEMPER FIDELIS Orders Order of the Garter; Order of the Bath

Military offices
Preceded by Alexander Galloway	GOC 1st Armoured Division; August–September 1944	Division disbanded
Preceded by Philip Gregson-Ellis	GOC 5th Infantry Division; 1944–1946	Succeeded by Philip Gregson-Ellis
Preceded by Philip Gregson-Ellis	Commandant of the Staff College, Camberley; 1946–1948	Succeeded by Sir Dudley Ward
Honorary titles
Preceded by Sir Bertie Fisher	Colonel of the 17th/21st Lancers; 1947–1957	Succeeded by Richard Hamilton-Russell
Military offices
Preceded by Lewis Lyne	Director of Staff Duties, War Office; 1948–1950	Succeeded by Edric Bastyan
Preceded by Sir Francis Festing	GOC British Troops in Egypt; 1954–1956	Troops withdrawn
Preceded by Sir Dudley Ward	Deputy Chief of the Imperial General Staff; 1956–1958	Succeeded by Sir Harold Pyman
Preceded by Sir Francis Festing	C-in-C Far East Land Forces; 1958–1961	Succeeded by Sir Nigel Poett
Preceded by Sir Francis Festing	Chief of the Imperial General Staff; 1961–1964	Position replaced by Chief of the General Staff
New title Position replaced Chief of the Imperial General Staff	Chief of the General Staff; 1964–1965	Succeeded by Sir James Cassels
Preceded by The Earl Mountbatten of Burma	Chief of the Defence Staff; 1965–1967	Succeeded by Sir Charles Elworthy
Honorary titles
Preceded by Sir Gerald Templer	Constable of the Tower of London; 1970–1975	Succeeded by Sir Geoffrey Baker
Preceded by The Lord Roborough	Lord Lieutenant of Devon; 1978–1982	Succeeded by The Earl of Morley
