= Baron Harding of Petherton =

Barony in the Peerage of the United Kingdom

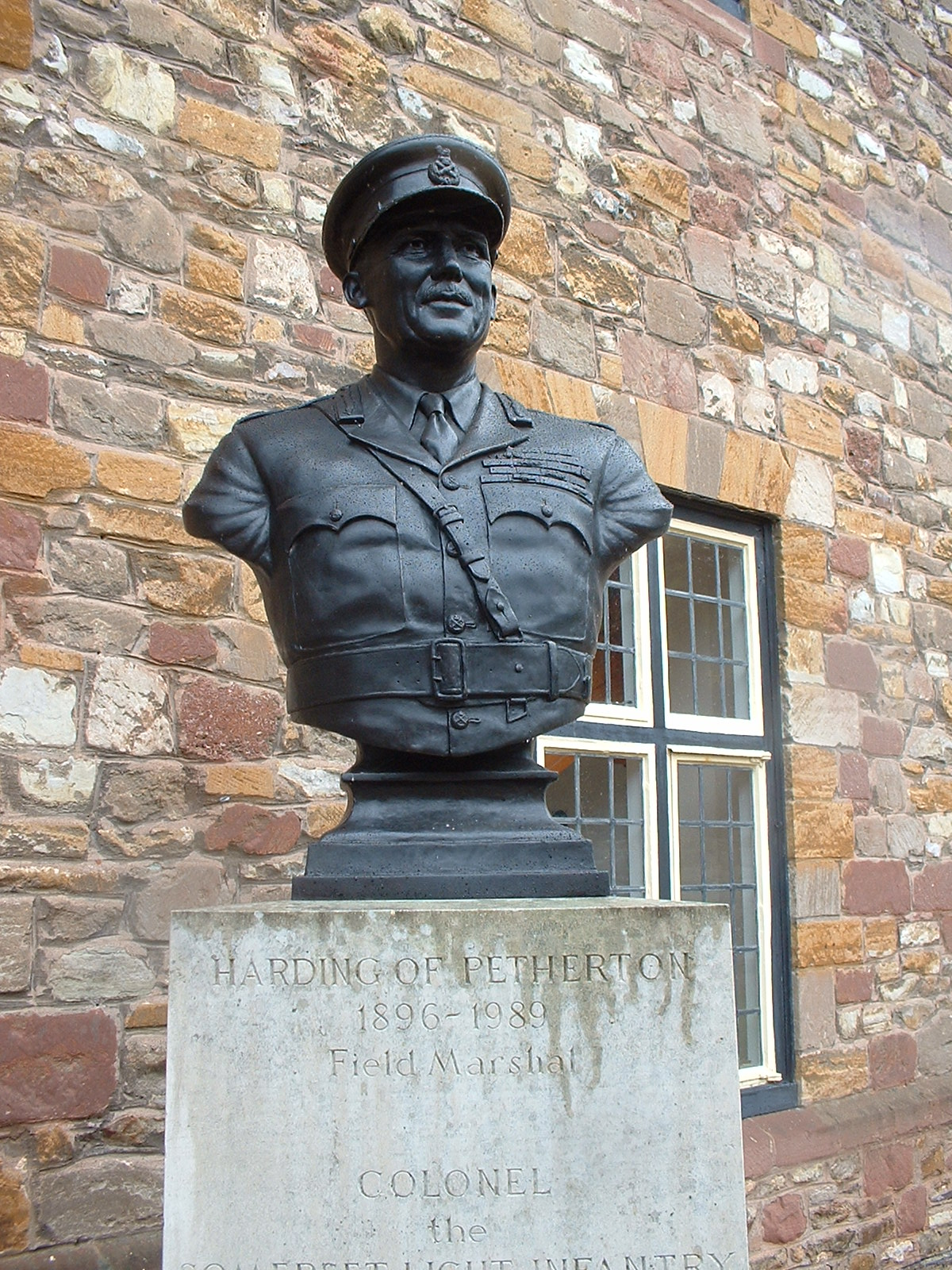
John Harding, 1st Baron Harding of Petherton.

Baron Harding of Petherton, of Nether Compton in the County of Dorset, is a title in the Peerage of the United Kingdom. It was created in 1958 for Field Marshal Sir John Harding. He served as Chief of the Imperial General Staff from 1952 to 1955 and as Governor of Cyprus from 1955 to 1957. The title is now held by his grandson, the third Baron, who succeeded his father in 2016.

Diana "Dido" Harding, Baroness Harding of Winscombe, a businesswoman and Conservative life peer, is the daughter of the 2nd Baron.

== Baron Harding of Petherton (1958) ==
- (Allan Francis) John Harding, 1st Baron Harding of Petherton (1896–1989)
- John Charles Harding, 2nd Baron Harding of Petherton (1928–2016)
- William Alan John Harding, 3rd Baron Harding of Petherton (born 1969)

The heir apparent is the present holder's son, the Hon. Angus John Edward Harding (born 2001).

=== Line of succession ===
- Field Marshal (Allan Francis) John Harding, 1st Baron Harding of Petherton (1896–1989)
  - John Charles Harding, 2nd Baron Harding of Petherton (1928–2016)
    - William Allan John Harding, 3rd Baron Harding of Petherton (born 1969)
      - Hon. Angus John Edward Harding (born 2001)
    - Hon. David Richard John Harding (born 1978)

== Arms ==
Coat of arms of Baron Harding of Petherton
Crest Out of a mural crown Gules a cubit arm in armour the hand gauntleted grasping a field marshal's baton in bend sinister Proper. Escutcheon Argent on a bend Azure between two lions passant guardant Gules as many kukris in saltire Proper between two martlets Or. Supporters Dexter a private of the 1st Life Guards of early nineteenth century; sinister a Somerset Light Infantryman of the late eighteenth century; both habited and accoutred Proper. Motto Vigilant & Resolute
