= Richard McCreery =

British Army general (1898–1967)

General Sir Richard McCreery GCB KBE DSO MC
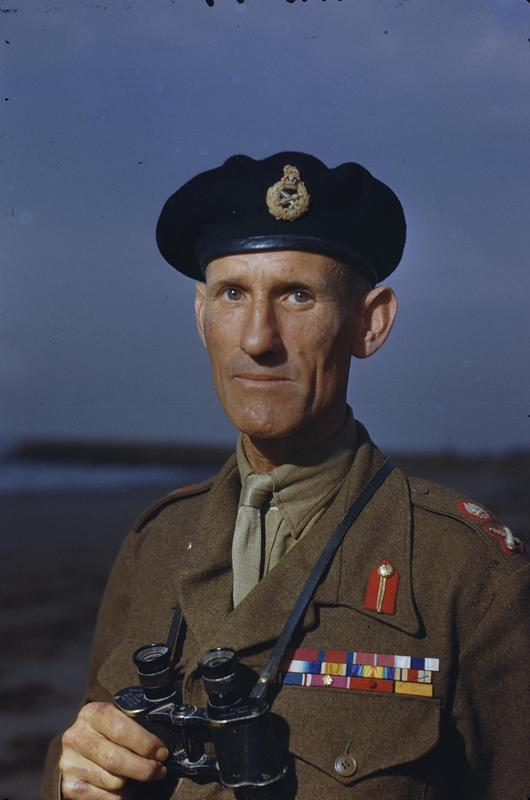
- Sir Richard McCreery as a lieutenant-general, pictured here in October 1944 in Italy after taking command of the Eighth Army
- Born: 1 February 1898; Market Harborough, Leicestershire, England
- Died: 18 October 1967 (aged 69); Templecombe, Somerset, England
- Military career
- Allegiance: United Kingdom
- Branch: British Army
- Service years: 1915–1949
- Rank: General
- Nickname: "Dick"
- Service number: 13599
- Unit: 12th Lancers
- Commands: British Army of the Rhine (1946–1948); British Forces in Austria (1945–1946); Eighth Army (1944–1945); X Corps (1943–1944); VIII Corps (1943); 2nd Armoured Group (1941–1942); 8th Armoured Division (1940–1941); 2nd Armoured Brigade (1940); 12th Lancers (1935–1938)
- Conflicts: First World War; Second World War
- Awards: Knight Grand Cross of the Order of the Bath; Knight Commander of the Order of the British Empire; Distinguished Service Order; Military Cross; Mentioned in Despatches; Distinguished Service Medal (United States); Officer of the Legion of Merit (United States); Grand Commander of the Order of the Phoenix (Greece)

General Sir Richard Loudon McCreery, GCB, KBE, DSO, MC (1 February 1898 – 18 October 1967) was a career soldier of the British Army, who was decorated for leading one of the last cavalry actions in the First World War. During the Second World War, he was chief of staff to General Sir Harold Alexander at the time of the Second Battle of El Alamein, and later commanded the British Eighth Army, fighting in the Italian campaign from October 1944 until the end of the war, leading it to victory in the final offensive in Italy.

== Background, early life and First World War ==
Richard Loudon McCreery was born on 1 February 1898, the eldest son of Walter Adolph McCreery of Bilton Park, Rugby, a Swiss-born American who spent most of his life in England but who represented the United States at polo at the 1900 Summer Olympics. His mother was Emilia McAdam, a great-great granddaughter of the Scottish engineer John Loudon McAdam, famous for his invention of the process of "Macadamization", a method of road surfacing, and great granddaughter of James Nicoll McAdam, known to his contemporaries as "The Colossus of Roads". Emilia's father had been a major in the 7th Dragoon Guards.

McCreery was educated at Bilton Grange, St Michael's Preparatory School, Westgate-on-Sea and Eton College. Six months after the outbreak of the First World War in August 1914, McCreery sat the entrance examination for the Royal Military College, Sandhurst, only days after his seventeenth birthday, the minimum age, and finished 12th of 212 entrants.

On 11 August 1915, McCreery was commissioned as a second lieutenant into the 12th (The Prince of Wales's Royal) Lancers, but instead of joining his regiment in France, was posted to the 6th Reserve Regiment of Cavalry based in Dublin for further training in cavalry tactics. Arriving in France on the Western Front in January 1916, McCreery found that his regiment, serving as part of the 5th Cavalry Brigade, had recently begun to operate in the infantry role in the trenches, although retaining the capability of reverting to cavalry should the need arise.

This they did in preparation for the Battle of Arras in April 1917, where the 12th Lancers and the rest of the 5th Cavalry Division formed a cavalry reserve in case there was a major breakthrough which could be exploited.

On 10 April, the cavalry moved up behind the advancing British infantry near Telegraph Hill and were kept in an exposed position overnight. The next morning, the British cavalry came under heavy German artillery and machine gun fire before they were withdrawn; McCreery was shot in his right thigh, severing his femoral artery. In an effort to stem the blood loss from his wound, the circulation in his leg had been restricted sufficiently to cause gangrene in his foot; McCreery refused to have his leg amputated but lost two toes and parts of the others. He would have to learn to walk and ride again, and was affected by a pronounced limp for the rest of his life.

McCreery finally rejoined the 12th Lancers on 11 September 1918. The regiment was back in the cavalry role supporting the advance of the Fourth Army during the Hundred Days Offensive. On 9 November, two days before the armistice, McCreery led No 3 Troop of B Squadron in a mounted attack on a German machine gun post and other positions near Solre-le-Château, capturing ten prisoners and a machine gun in the process. He was recommended for the Military Cross, which was confirmed on 18 December. The MC's citation reads:

On 9th November, 1918, east of the Avesnes-Maubeuge road, for valuable and dashing work when in command of a mounted patrol sent forward to get in touch with the retiring enemy. He pushed boldly forward skilfully clearing up an enemy machine-gun post which threatened to hold up his advance from the outset, capturing ten prisoners and one machine gun. He then cleared three villages and sent back a most accurate and clear report.

In the words of his biographer, Richard Mead:

For Dick the war ended on a high note. His actions in the closing days had served to increase the regard in which he was held by his fellow officers in the regiment. Victor Carwright, for instance, who was close to him for most of his service in France, wrote much later that he had no superior as a troop commander. He had come close to death at Arras, a stroke of good fortune allowing him to survive a conflict in which a significant percentage of his generation had been swept away. Like most of his contemporaries who had served for some time on the Western Front, he could not fail to have been profoundly affected by the experience, but he probably believed that what they had achieved would make the world a better place. Few thought it possible that it could happen all over again.

== Between the wars ==
McCreery was appointed adjutant of his regiment in December 1921. He was appointed a Member of the Order of the British Empire (MBE) in the 1926 Birthday Honours. He attended the Staff College, Camberley, from 1928 to 1929. His fellow students in the Junior Division there included Gerard Bucknall, Gerald Templer, Alexander Cameron, Alexander Galloway, I. S. O. Playfair, John Harding, Philip Gregson-Ellis and Gordon MacMillan, whilst the instructors included Richard O'Connor, Bernard Paget, Henry Pownall, Harold Franklyn and Bernard Montgomery.

He was then appointed brigade major of the 2nd Cavalry Brigade in 1930 and Commanding Officer of his regiment in 1935.

The inter-war years saw McCreery's greatest sporting achievements (see Equestrianism below). His outstanding skill as a horseman was achieved despite the loss of several toes and a hole in the riding muscle of his right leg, as a result of his wounding in the First World War, which left him with a pronounced limp for the rest of his life.

In 1928 McCreery married Lettice St. Maur, daughter of Major Lord Percy St. Maur (younger brother of the 15th Duke of Somerset) and the Hon. Violet White.

The interwar years were not without tragedy for McCreery. In 1921 one of his younger brothers, Bob, was killed in Ireland by republican forces. He was serving in the British Army, but off-duty at the time. McCreery's youngest brother, Jack, who was a playwright with a play running in the West End, took his own life.

== Second World War ==
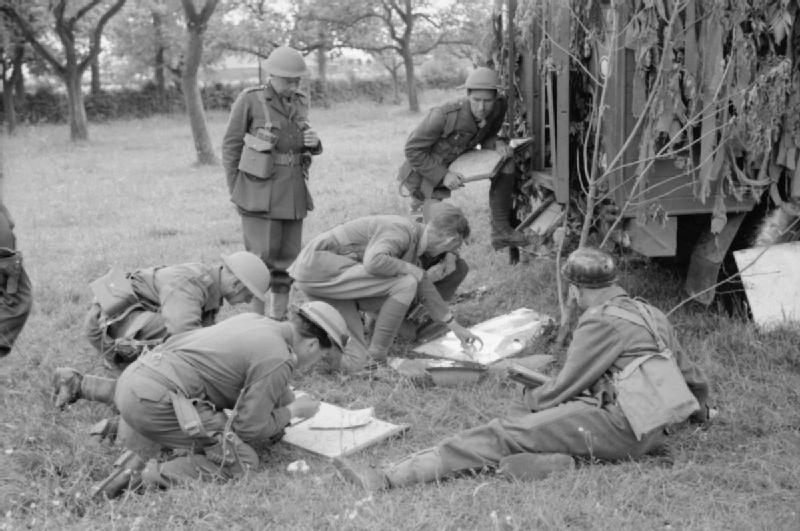
Brigadier Richard McCreery (centre, with no headgear), commanding the 2nd Armoured Brigade, consulting a map with members of his staff in an orchard near Abbeville, France, June 1940.

In May–June 1940, several months after the Second World War began, McCreery was involved in the Battle of France, towards the end of which he commanded the 2nd Armoured Brigade, of the 1st Armoured Division, which found itself fighting alongside French General Charles de Gaulle. McCreery was impressed by de Gaulle's bearing during the latter's direction of a counter-attack at Abbeville, and remained an admirer of the French general in later years.

McCreery remained in command of the brigade in the United Kingdom until mid-December when, at the relatively young age of forty-two, he was promoted to the acting rank of major-general and was made general officer commanding (GOC) of the 8th Armoured Division. The division, created only the month before, was one of several created in the aftermath of Dunkirk although, as with most of the rest of the army, the equipment situation was still severe. This, however, was not enough to deter McCreery, who threw himself into his new role with his typical enthusiasm and was determined to train his new division up to the very highest standards. He evidently succeeded in this task, being described as the first British commander "to appreciate and demonstrate the power of an armoured division employed on the ground in defence." He received further recognition from both the press and his superior officers in October 1941 when the army conducted large-scale manoeuvres, where McCreery's division was able to prove what it learned in the last few months. General Sir Alan Brooke, then the Commander-in-Chief, Home Forces (and soon to be Chief of the Imperial General Staff), was among those who praised McCreery and saw much promise in him, writing in his diary that the division was "going on well under Dick McCreery."

McCreery was an expert on the use of light armoured vehicles (such vehicles being the mechanised equivalent of the cavalry of which his regiment had been part). His next posting overseas during the Second World War was as Adviser, Armoured Fighting Vehicles, Middle East (March to August 1942), where he was Claude Auchinleck's chief adviser on such matters. There followed spells working for General Sir Harold Alexander first as Chief of General Staff, Middle East Command in Cairo and then Chief of General Staff, 18th Army Group during the Tunisian campaign (1942–43). At Middle East Command Alexander was Montgomery's superior at the time of the Second Battle of El Alamein, in October 1942, and McCreery had a role in the planning of that battle, in which armoured vehicles played such a significant part.

McCreery remained at Alexander's side when the latter was made commander of the 18th Army Group in mid-February 1943. This brought McCreery into contact for the first time with the Americans, who had entered the war fourteen months earlier. As he had at El Alamein, McCreery continued to play an important role and, as the Allied campaign in Tunisia was drawing to a close in the next few weeks, he pressed Alexander to switch some of the divisions from Montgomery's Eighth Army to Anderson's First Army as, by now, it was evident that Montgomery's attacks had stalled at Enfidaville. Montgomery eventually agreed to the idea and the Axis forces in North Africa finally surrendered on 13 May, with some 238,000 of them being taken prisoner by the Allies. Brooke, the CIGS, believed McCreery never received the credit he deserved in the ultimately triumphant campaign. McCreery himself, always modest, wrote simply to his wife, "This time, anyway, I feel that I have had some small hand in this success."

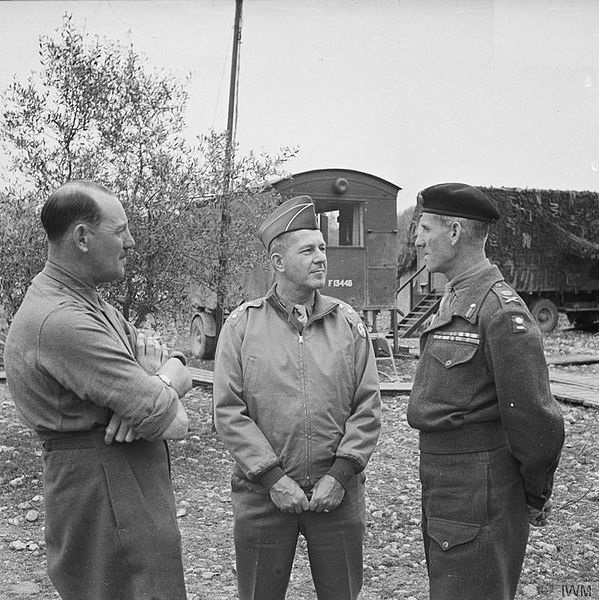
From left to right, Lieutenant General Sir Oliver Leese, American Lieutenant General Jacob L. Devers and Lieutenant General R. L. McCreery at Eighth Army Tactical Headquarters.

McCreery was given command of VIII Corps in the United Kingdom in July 1943 and then, following the Axis surrender in Tunisia, he was given command of X Corps in August 1943 which was training to take part in the Italian campaign. X Corps, now under command of the US Fifth Army under Mark W. Clark, played a key role at the bitterly contested Salerno landings, in September 1943, then fought its way, reaching the River Garigliano at the end of 1943 to be halted in front of the Winter Line and were involved in the first Battle of Monte Cassino in January 1944 and later the capture of Rome on 4 June 1944. In September 1943, McCreery was responsible for dealing with the Salerno mutiny.

McCreery was knighted in the field in July 1944 by King George VI, at Palazzo del Pero, near Arezzo, Italy.

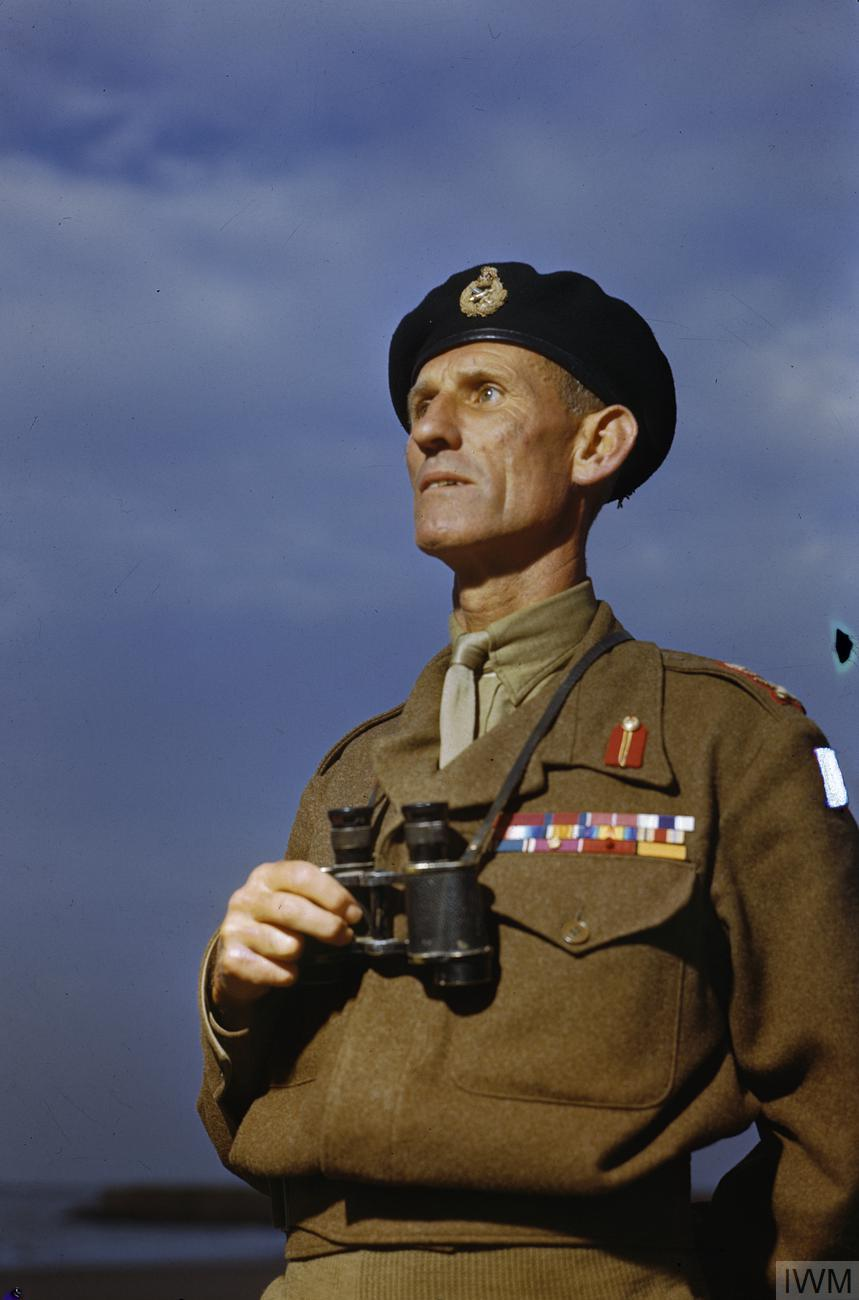
McCreery as the Eighth Army commander at TAC Eighth Army HQ, Italy, 1 October 1944.

McCreery took over command of the Eighth Army from Lieutenant General Oliver Leese on 1 October 1944. The 1945 spring offensive which followed, conducted jointly by the Eighth Army and the Fifth Army, now commanded by Lucian K. Truscott, another cavalryman, culminated in a 23-day battle which resulted in the surrender of nearly a million German soldiers.

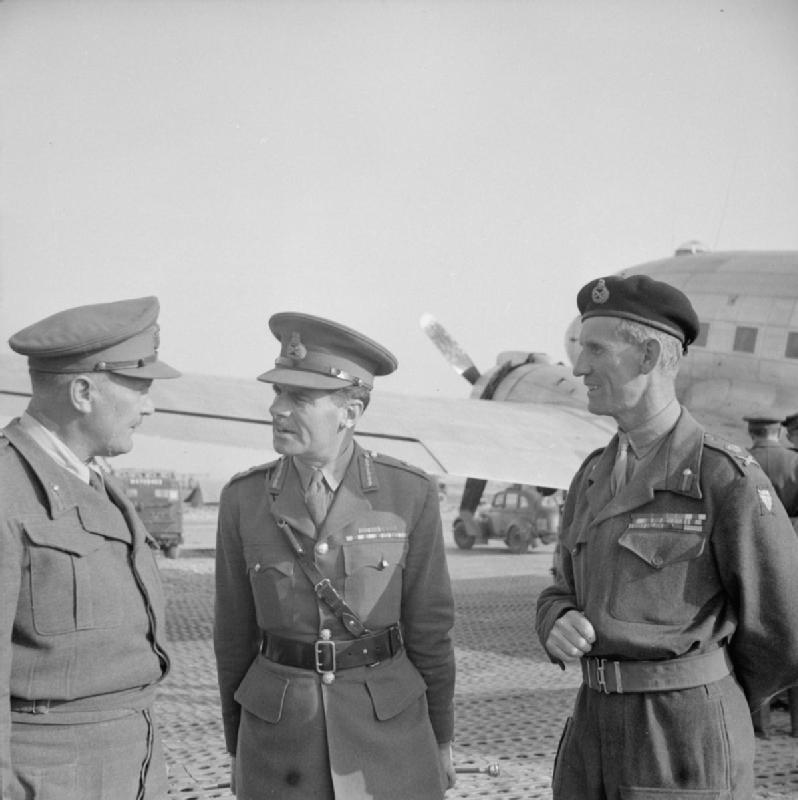
Lieutenant General Sir Archibald Nye, Vice Chief of the Imperial General Staff (VCIGS) with Lieutenant-General Sir Bernard Freyberg (left) and Lieutenant-General Sir Richard McCreery (right) at Forli airfield, Italy during a flying visit to the Eighth Army, March 1945.

The achievements of the Eighth Army in this last campaign are perhaps less well remembered than those during the Western Desert Campaign under Montgomery. This is because they were overshadowed by the contemporaneous campaign in Northern France following the Normandy landings in June 1944 which was the main focus of public attention at the time, and has similarly attracted more attention from subsequent historians.

Doherty sums up this, the final campaign of the Eighth Army as follows: ‘Sir Richard McCreery had managed one of the finest performances of a British army in the course of the war. He had done so through attention to detail, careful planning and a strategic flair that had few superiors.’

McCreery was the last commander of the British Eighth Army; in 1945 it was re-constituted as British Troops Austria. He was also the only cavalryman to command it. He was appointed a Knight Commander of the Order of the British Empire in July 1945.

== Post-war years ==
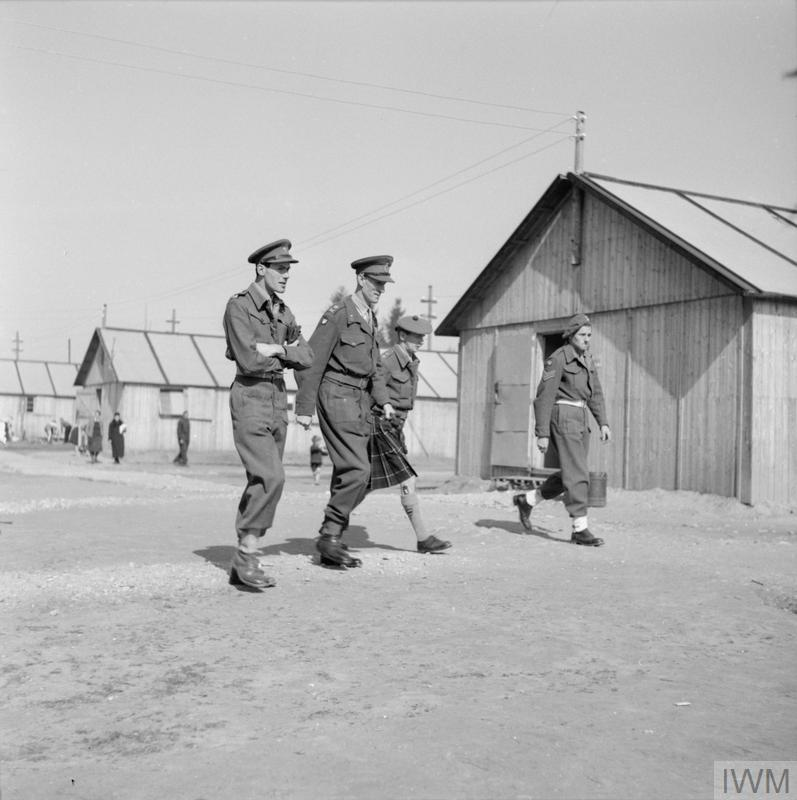
Lieutenant-General Sir Richard McCreery, Commander-in-Chief, British Forces in Austria, visits Kellerberg Camp for displaced persons, 29 March 1946.

After the war McCreery was General Officer Commanding-in-Chief, British Forces of Occupation in Austria and British representative on the Allied Commission for Austria. He was thus responsible for running that part of the country under British occupation. (Austria, including Vienna, was divided between the four Allied powers, in the manner portrayed in the celebrated film, The Third Man.) During his time in Austria his office was next to a room in Schönbrunn Palace, just outside Vienna, which was known as the Napoleonzimmer, so commemorating a very different occupation. McCreery held this post from July 1945 to March 1946. From 1946 to 1948, McCreery was General Officer Commanding-in-Chief, British Army of the Rhine in Germany, succeeding Field Marshal Montgomery. In 1948–49, McCreery was the British Army Representative on the Military Staff Committee at the United Nations. McCreery lived with his family on Long Island and commuted to an office on the 61st floor of the Empire State Building in New York. The agenda of the Committee at that time was to set up an independent fighting force for the United Nations, an aim which was never realised.

== Retirement ==
McCreery was made a full general in 1949. In 1951 he was given the colonelcy of the 12th Royal Lancers, transferring after their merger in 1960 to the 9th/12th Royal Lancers, a post he held until 1961. McCreery retired from the Army on 9 December 1949.

He lived the rest of his life at Stowell Hill in Somerset, a house built by his mother and designed by a pupil of the architect Edwin Lutyens. Next to riding McCreery's great passion was gardening, and he continued to develop the garden originally laid out by his mother, Emilia McAdam.

After his retirement from the Army in 1949, General McCreery did not play an active part in public life; however, at the time of the Suez Crisis in 1956 he was moved to write a personal letter of protest to his war-time acquaintance Harold Macmillan, then a member of Sir Anthony Eden's cabinet, as he regarded the operation as dishonourable. General Sir Richard McCreery died on 18 October 1967 aged 69. His memorial service was held in Westminster Abbey.

== Equestrianism ==
Appropriately for a man who was associated all his adult life with a cavalry regiment, McCreery was a highly accomplished horseman. He twice won the Grand Military Gold Cup at Sandown Park Racecourse (in 1923 and 1928), and represented the Army at polo. In 1924 he and his younger brother Captain Selby McCreery constituted 50 percent of the Army polo team that played against the United States. In retirement during the 1950s, Dick McCreery took up polo again for a time, playing at Windsor Great Park.

He hunted all his life with the Blackmore Vale Hunt, of which he became joint Master of Foxhounds.

At the Coronation of Queen Elizabeth II in 1953 the State Coach was drawn by six grey horses, one of which was named McCreery, the others being named after five other Second World War generals, a distinction which must have been particularly appreciated by McCreery in view of his lifelong association with horses.

McCreery's steeplechasing accomplishments are commemorated in an annual race at Sandown Park, The Dick McCreery Hunters' Steeple Chase, run on the day of the Grand Military Gold Cup.

== Character and ability ==
In his character General McCreery was modest to the point of shyness. He was not comfortable in public speaking, but as Doherty puts it: 'Not a self-publicist in the manner of Montgomery, McCreery managed nonetheless to gain the confidence of his soldiers who trusted him in peace and war'. An over-riding sense of duty might be said to have characterised his life and career. McCreery was clearly possessed of a high intelligence, which was not restricted in its operation by the early end of his formal academic education. Harold Macmillan, later to become Prime Minister, characterised McCreery as a 'very clever' man in his wartime diaries. Following a meeting at Eighth Army Headquarters in Forli, Northern Italy, in April 1945, he wrote: ‘He [McCreery] has always struck me as one of the ablest of the military officers whom I have seen out here'. McCreery regarded Montgomery as excessively cautious and indeed historians like Corelli Barnett have suggested that Montgomery failed to press home his advantage after the Battle of Alamein to the extent that he might have done.

== Descendants ==
McCreery and his wife, Lettice St. Maur, had four sons and one daughter. Their eldest son, Michael, was a member of the Communist Party of Great Britain in the early 1960s but left in 1963 to become leader of the Committee to Defeat Revisionism, for Communist Unity. The youngest son is the psychologist and author Charles McCreery.

== Honours and decorations ==
Knight Grand Cross of the Order of the Bath 1949 (KCB 5 August 1943, CB 18 February 1943)
Knight Commander of the Most Excellent Order of the British Empire (KBE 5 July 1945), (MBE 1926 Birthday Honours)
Distinguished Service Order (DSO 27 September 1940)
Military Cross (MC 1918)
Mentioned in Despatches 29 April 1941, 13 January 1944
Officer, Legion of Merit (United States) 10 August 1943
Grand Commander, Order of the Phoenix (Greece) 20 June 1944
Distinguished Service Medal (United States) 2 August 1945

== Bibliography ==
- Blaxland, Gregory (1977). The Plain Cook and the Great Showman: The First and Eighth Armies in North Africa. Kimber. ISBN 0-7183-0185-4.
- Blaxland, Gregory (1979). Alexander's Generals (the Italian Campaign 1944–1945). London: William Kimber & Co. ISBN 0-7183-0386-5.
- Barnett, Correlli (1999). The Desert Generals. Cassell. ISBN 0-304-35280-2.
- Devereux, Roy (1936). John Loudon McAdam: Chapters in the History of Highways. London: Oxford University Press.
- Doherty, Richard (2004). Ireland's Generals in the Second World War. Four Courts Press. ISBN 9781851828654.
- Macmillan, Harold (1984). War Diaries: Politics and War in the Mediterranean, January 1943 – May 1945. Macmillan. ISBN 9780333371985.
- Strawson, John (1973). General Sir Richard McCreery. A Portrait. Privately published.
- Who's Who, 1965. London: Adam & Charles Black.
- Mead, Richard (2007). Churchill's Lions: a biographical guide to the key British generals of World War II. Stroud (UK): Spellmount. ISBN 978-1-86227-431-0.
- Mead, Richard (2012). The Last Great Cavalryman: The Life of General Sir Richard McCreery, Commander Eighth Army. Casemate Publishers. ISBN 978-1-84884-465-0.
- Smart, Nick (2005). Biographical Dictionary of British Generals of the Second World War. Barnesley: Pen & Sword. ISBN 1844150496.

== See also ==
- Spring 1945 offensive in Italy
- Operation Herring
- Operation Roast

== Footnotes ==
Military offices
New command	GOC 8th Armoured Division; 1940–1941	Succeeded by Charles Norman
New command	GOC 2nd Armoured Group; 1941–1942	Succeeded by Montagu Brocas Burrows
Preceded by Herbert Lumsden	GOC VIII Corps; July – August 1943	Succeeded by John Harding
Preceded by Brian Horrocks	GOC X Corps; 1943–1944	Succeeded by John Hawkesworth
Preceded by Sir Oliver Leese	GOC Eighth Army; 1944–1945	Command disbanded
Preceded by Viscount Montgomery	C-in-C British Army of the Rhine; 1946–1948	Succeeded by Sir Charles Keightley
Honorary titles
Preceded by The Lord Birdwood	Colonel of the 12th Royal Lancers; 1951–1960	Became 9th/12th Royal Lancers
New regiment	Colonel of the 9th/12th Lancers; 1960–1961	Succeeded by Gerald Grosvenor
