= John Harding, 2nd Baron Harding of Petherton =

British Army officer and hereditary peer

The Right Honourable The Lord Harding of Petherton

Member of the House of Lords
- Lord Temporal
- as a hereditary peer 20 January 1989 – 11 November 1999
- Preceded by: The 1st Baron Harding of Petherton
- Succeeded by: Seat abolished (Note: Under the House of Lords Act 1999.)

Personal details
- Born: John Charles Harding; 12 February 1928
- Died: 6 June 2016 (aged 88)
- Party: Conservative

John Charles Harding, 2nd Baron Harding of Petherton (12 February 1928 – 6 June 2016), was a British Army officer and hereditary peer.

Harding was educated at Marlborough College and Worcester College, Oxford (MA). He was commissioned into the British Army and served with the 11th Hussars, reaching the rank of major. He succeeded his father John Harding, 1st Baron Harding of Petherton, to the title of Baron Harding of Petherton in 1989.

By his wife, Harriet Hare (daughter of Major General Francis Hare), whom he married in 1966, he had two sons and one daughter. She died on 4 December 2012. Their daughter, Dido Harding, Baroness Harding of Winscombe, is married to Conservative MP John Penrose. Harding died in June 2016 at the age of 88, and was succeeded in the barony by his eldest son, William.

== Arms ==
Coat of arms of John Harding, 2nd Baron Harding of Petherton
Crest Out of a mural crown Gules a cubit arm in armour the hand gauntleted grasping a field marshal's baton in bend sinister Proper. Escutcheon Argent on a bend Azure between two lions passant guardant Gules as many kukris in saltire Proper between two martlets Or. Supporters Dexter a private of the 1st Life Guards of early nineteenth century; sinister a Somerset Light Infantryman of the late eighteenth century; both habited and accoutred Proper. Motto Vigilant & Resolute

== Notes ==
Peerage of the United Kingdom
Preceded by John Harding	Baron Harding of Petherton; 1989–2016; Member of the House of Lords (1989–1999)	Succeeded by William Harding
