= James Gammell =

British Army general (1892–1975)

Lieutenant-General Sir James Gammell KCB DSO MC DL
- Portrait by Walter Stoneman, 1942
- Born: 26 September 1892; Edinburgh, Scotland
- Died: 1 September 1975 (aged 82); Alyth, Perthshire, Scotland
- Military career
- Allegiance: United Kingdom
- Branch: British Army
- Service years: 1911–1946
- Rank: Lieutenant-General
- Service number: 8402
- Units: Scottish Horse; Royal Field Artillery; Queen's Own Cameron Highlanders
- Commands: Eastern Command (1942–1943, 1945); XII Corps (1941–1942); 3rd Infantry Division (1940–1941); 15th Infantry Brigade (1940); 4th Infantry Brigade (1938–1940); 1st Battalion, Queen's Own Cameron Highlanders (1935–1938)
- Conflicts: First World War; Second World War
- Awards: Knight Commander of the Order of the Bath; Distinguished Service Order; Military Cross; Mentioned in Despatches (7)

Lieutenant-General Sir James Andrew Harcourt Gammell, KCB, DSO, MC, DL (26 September 1892 – 1 September 1975) was a British Army officer who fought during both the First and Second World Wars.

== Early life and military career ==
Born in Edinburgh on 26 September 1892, the son of Sydney James and Alice Stobart, Gammell was educated at Winchester College, followed by the Pembroke College, Oxford, and was commissioned as a second lieutenant into the Scottish Horse in January 1913. He transferred to the Royal Field Artillery on 5 August 1914, the day after Britain entered the First World War. Gammell initially served with the 113th Battery of the 25th Brigade Royal Field Artillery, part of the 1st Division, and was sent to France on 20 August as part of the British Expeditionary Force. In March 1915, he was awarded the Military Cross (MC): the citation for the medal reads:

For gallantry and marked ability at Cuinchy on the 10th January, 1915, when in the forward artillery observation station, and for leaving his trench under fire on two occasions to repair telephone wires.

Later in the year Gammell fought in the Gallipoli campaign, where he was twice mentioned in despatches and, after this, he spent the rest of the war as a staff officer. He was posted to the HQ of the Egyptian Expeditionary Force (EEF), initially as a General Staff Officer Grade 3 (GSO3), later as GSO2 before returning to France in the summer of 1918 and, finally, being sent to England where he was GSO2 at the War Office. By the end of the war, Gammell was highly decorated; mentioned in dispatches seven times, twice awarded the MC, the first in 1915, and again in 1917, and gained the Distinguished Service Order in 1918. The citation for his second MC reads:

For conspicuous gallantry and devotion to duty when employed as Staff Officer to the Armoured Car Patrol. He displayed great coolness under heavy fire, and his energy and perseverance greatly assisted in the success of the operations.

== Between the wars ==
Gammell remained in the army after the war, and was married in June 1919 to Gertrude Don. They had four children; James Gilbert Sydney, the eldest, born on 4 March 1920, John Frederick followed, born on 31 December 1921, Mary Finella, born on 15 April 1924, and Elizabeth Alice, the youngest, born on 22 April 1926.

Gammell later attended the Staff College, Camberley, from 1921 to 1922. After serving as a GSO2 with Aldershot Command in 1924, followed by a promotion to major and a transfer to the Queen's Own Cameron Highlanders in May 1927, he served with the 2nd Battalion, Camerons in Edinburgh, followed by a year with the 1st Battalion in Rangoon, Burma before returning to England and returning to the Staff College, Camberley, this time as a GSO2 with the rank of acting lieutenant-colonel, a position he held for five years, from 1930 to 1935.

In May 1935, Gammell was promoted to lieutenant-colonel and appointed commanding officer of the 1st Battalion, Queen's Own Cameron Highlanders until 1938, when he attended the Imperial Defence College. Douglas Wimberley succeeded him in command of the battalion. This was followed by a promotion to the temporary rank of brigadier in December 1938, and he assumed command of the 4th Infantry Brigade, part of the 2nd Infantry Division.

== Second World War ==
Shortly after the outbreak of the Second World War in September 1939, Gammell, along with his brigade, was deployed to France towards the end of the month, where it became part of the British Expeditionary Force. Unlike in the First World War, where there was almost immediate action, the first few months of the Second World War where for the Western Allies relatively quiet, and no major actions took place leading to this period of time becoming known as the "Phoney War". After his brigade spent the first few months of the war digging defensive positions in expectation of a repeat of the trench warfare of 1914–1918, in February 1940 Gammell returned to England where he was given a new role as chief of staff of the newly created IV Corps, then commanded by Lieutenant-General Claude Auchinleck, who noted that Gammell "worked like a slave" and that his "energy, determination and devotion to duty were remarkable", and then of Allied Forces Norway during the ill-fated Norwegian Campaign later that year.

In late June 1940, returning again to England, Gammell was given command of the 15th Infantry Brigade. The brigade had recently fought in Norway where it had sustained nearly 800 casualties and was evacuated to Scotland in early May. Gammell's brigade came under the 5th Infantry Division in early July. Along with the division, Gammell and his brigade commenced anti-invasion duties and concentrated on reforming and being brought up to strength again.

Gammell was only to remain with the brigade for four weeks, as was prompted to major-general in July, and became GOC 3rd Infantry Division. His new command was stationed in Southern England and had recently fought in France. Gammell's division was assigned to the GHQ Home Forces reserve, and held in readiness in a counterattack role in the event of a German invasion. Gammell continued his command and counterattack role through to November 1941. In late November 1941, Gammell was promoted and took command of XII Corps with the acting rank of lieutenant-general. His corps was tasked with the defence of southern England, although the threat of invasion had receded. He also began training for offensive operations overseas, which included Exercise Tiger in May 1942.

In September 1942, Gammell took over Eastern Command. For the rest of the year and throughout 1943, several large-scale exercises took place. This included Exercise Spartan, the largest military exercise ever held in the United Kingdom, in March, where Gammell's command played the role of the "German Sixth Army" against Lieutenant-General Andrew McNaughton's First Canadian Army, which in turn was played the role of the British Second Army.

In early January 1944, Gammell was appointed Chief of Staff to the Supreme Allied Commander Mediterranean, General Sir Henry Maitland Wilson. This command oversaw all operations in the Mediterranean theatre, in particular on the Italian Front.

== Postwar ==
After the war Gammell became Head of the British Military Mission to Moscow and retired from the army in May 1946.

Gammell lived at Alrick in Glenisla. He was Deputy lieutenant for Angus and, after the death of his first wife, Gertrude (or "G" as he called her), in 1960, he was remarried four years later to Mary Kirkwood, daughter of a Royal Navy officer. Gammell himself died on 1 September 1975, just a few weeks short of his 83rd birthday, and was cremated, with his ashes buried at Alrick.

== Bibliography ==
- Smart, Nick (2005). Biographical Dictionary of British Generals of the Second World War. Barnesley: Pen & Sword. ISBN 1844150496.

Military offices
Preceded by Bernard Montgomery	GOC 3rd Infantry Division; 1940–1941	Succeeded by Eric Hayes
Preceded by Bernard Montgomery	GOC XII Corps; 1941–1942	Succeeded by Montagu Stopford
Preceded by Kenneth Anderson	GOC-in-C Eastern Command; 1942–1944	Succeeded by Sir Kenneth Anderson
