= Exercise Spartan =

World War II exercise

Exercise Spartan was a Second World War military exercise that took place from 4 to 12 March 1943 in England. It was a test of the structures, components, and organization of the Canadian Army at that time. The exercise was the largest field force ever commanded by a Canadian officer up until that time. It was described by The Times as “the greatest offensive exercise ever staged in the military history of these islands.”

== Background ==
Exercise Spartan was a follow-up to Exercise Bumper conducted in October 1941. This one however, was an offensive exercise where the Allied Army under the command of a Canadian General was expected to advance across a bridgehead and take the capital city of the fictional enemy country of Eastland which was located at Huntingdon.

== Purpose of the Exercise ==
Infantrymen of Le Régiment de Maisonneuve in a defensive firing position during Exercise Spartan, England, 7 March 1943.

The exercise was part of series of exercises intended to prepare allied forces for the eventual invasion of North Western Europe. It was meant to trial the formations, commanders and support functions. Many newer capabilities were also tried for the first time including the coordination between air and land forces during offensive operations.

General McNaughton described the purpose of the exercise as follows in an after action report:

This large scale exercise was designed as a strict test of the physical condition and endurance of the troops, their proficiency in movement and tactics and of the ability of commanders and staffs to administer, handle and fight their formations and units.

== Order of Battle ==
The exercise had the First Canadian Army face off against British troops who were fulfilling the role of the German army.

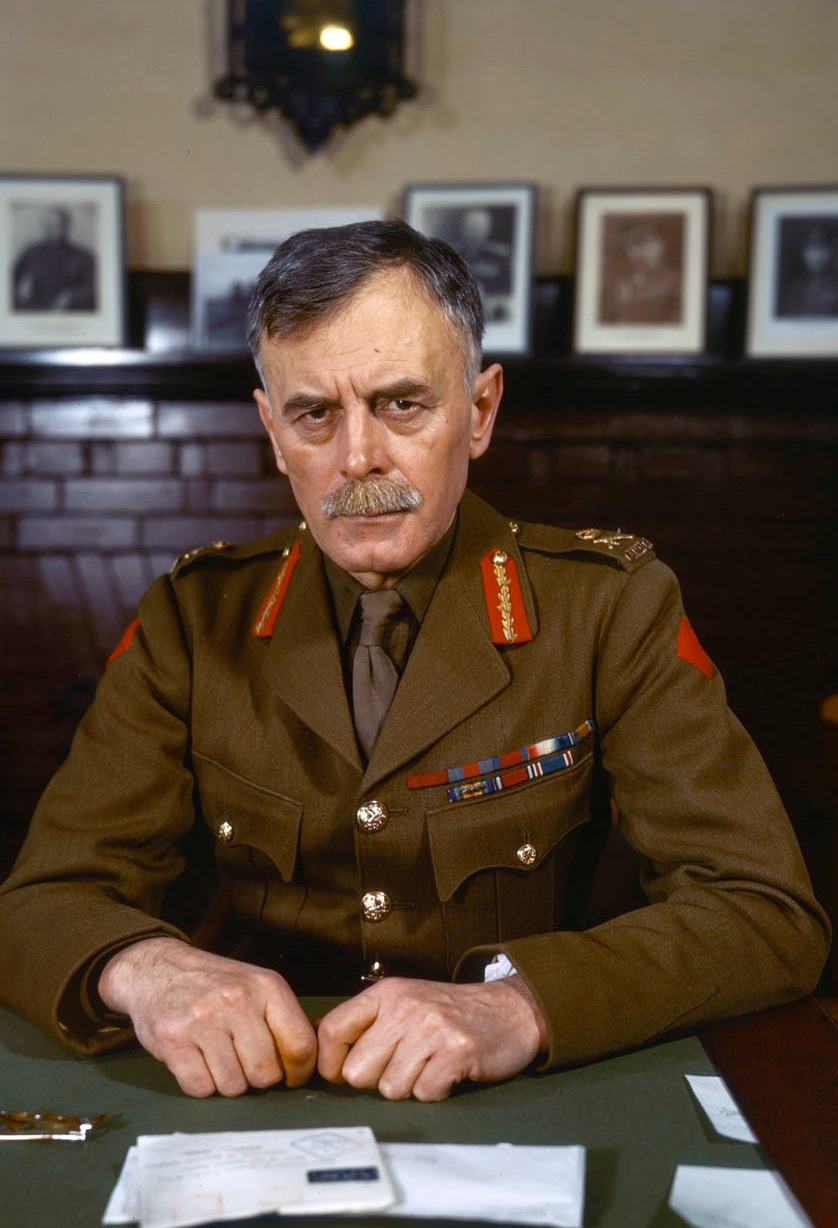
General Andrew McNaughton, 1943.

=== First Canadian Army ===
Commander: Lt Gen A. McNaughton
Unit	Sub-Unit
1 Canadian Corps	2 Canadian Infantry Division
	3 Canadian Infantry Division
	1 Canadian Army Tank Brigade
2 Canadian Corps	Guards Armoured Division
	5 Canadian Armoured Division
12 Corps	43 Division
	53 DIvision
Z Mobile Composite Group, RAF	

=== German Forces, or Eastland ===
Commander: Lt Gen JAH Gemmel
Unit	Sub-Unit
British VIII Corps	9 Armoured Division
	42 Armoured Division
British XI Corps	49 Infantry Division
	61 Infantry Division
Buckinghamshire Brigade Group	
X Mobile Composite Group, RAF	

== Results of the Exercise ==
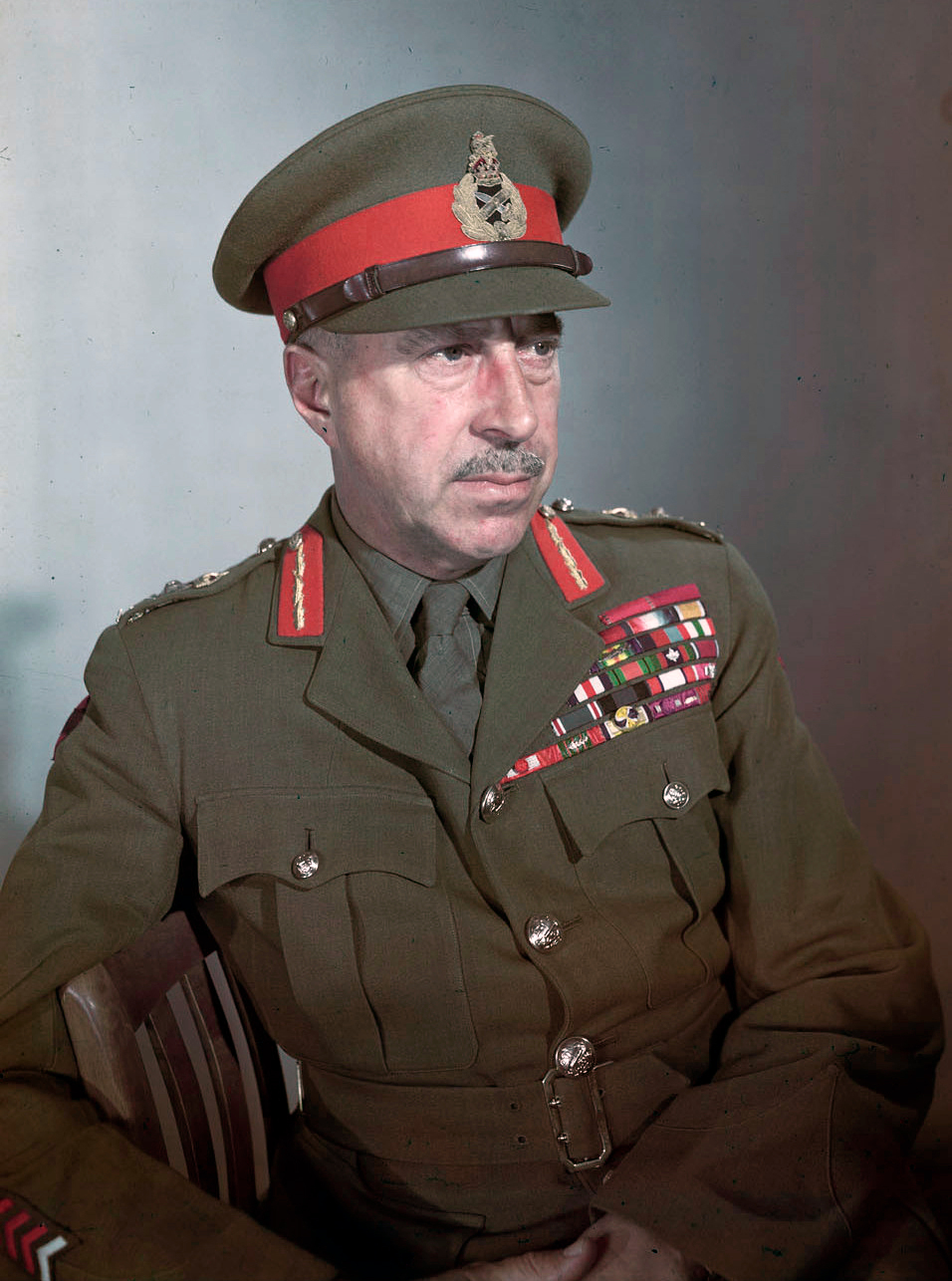
Gen Crerar c. 1943-45

While many lessons were learned throughout the exercise, the main result was that LGen McNaughton performance in command of the 1st Canadian Army was deemed unsatisfactory and he was relieved of command. Command was eventually given to General Crerar (1 Canadian Corps Commander during the Exercise). While it was clear since at least 1941 General Sir Alan Brooke had had issue with McNaughton, it seems that Brooke was able to use McNaughton's performance during Ex Spartan to relieve him.

== See also ==
- General Andrew McNaughton's Relief of Army Command
