= Nether Compton =

Village in Dorset, England

Coordinates: 50.9542°N 2.5742°W

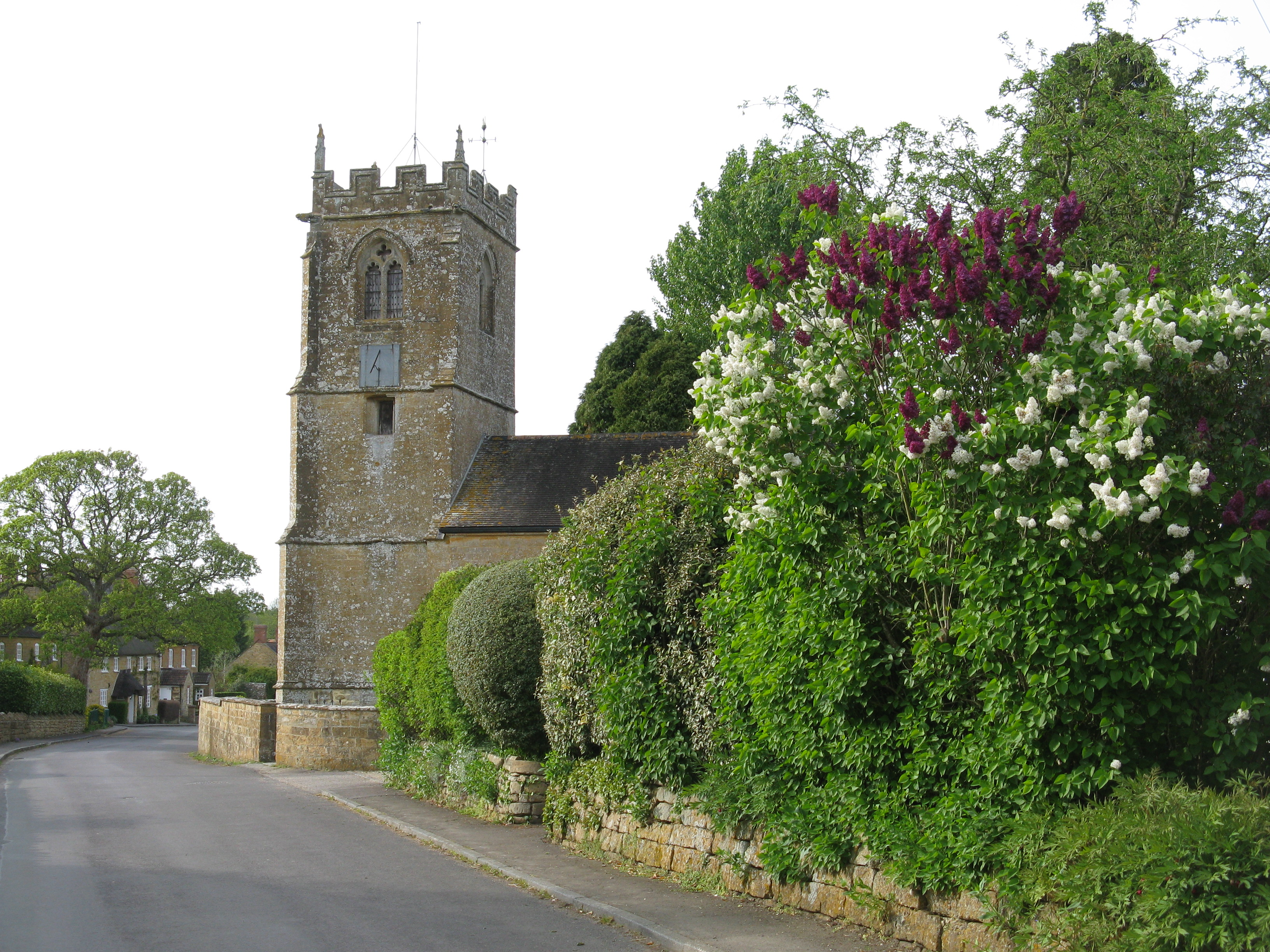
- Nether Compton parish church

- Location within Dorset
- Population: 328
- OS grid reference: ST598173
- Unitary authority: Dorset
- Ceremonial county: Dorset
- Region: South West
- Country: England
- Sovereign state: United Kingdom
- Post town: Sherborne
- Postcode district: DT9
- Police: Dorset
- Fire: Dorset and Wiltshire
- Ambulance: South Western
- UK Parliament: West Dorset

Nether Compton is a village and civil parish in the English county of Dorset, situated approximately 3 miles (4.8 km) west of Sherborne and 3 miles east of Yeovil in Somerset. In the 2011 census the parish had a population of 328.

== History ==
Nether Compton was burnt in 1066 by William, Duke of Normandy.

The parish church of St. Nicholas has a 13th-century chancel, nave and south porch. The west tower, north chapel and nave windows demonstrate that the church was altered significantly in the 15th century. The whole building was then restored in the 1880s, when the chapel was extended and various internal modifications made. The stone screen is Perpendicular and the pulpit early 17th century. The west tower houses five bells: one from the 15th century (Salisbury foundry, inscribed "Sit Semper Sine Ve Qui Michi Dicit Ave"), one dated 1585, two dated 1658 (Thomas Purdue, Closworth) and one from 1886 (Gillett and Co., Croydon).

Many of the buildings in the village date from when it was improved in the last decades of the 19th century, Colonel John R. P. Goodden having inherited Compton House in 1883. Architect Evelyn Hellicar (1862–1929) is responsible for a number of the buildings. These include Sheriff's Lodge (1889). The Grade II listed former village school, built c. 1843, is now a private home.

The village was rated as among the "20 most beautiful villages in the UK and Ireland" by Condé Nast Traveler in 2020.

== Notable residents ==
Nether Compton was the childhood home of BAFTA Award winning actress Kristin Scott Thomas and of her younger sister, Serena Scott Thomas, also an actress, who was born in the village.

Harald Penrose (1904-1996), British test pilot and aviation author, lived in Nether Compton for more than fifty years in a house of his own design.

Over Compton was the childhood home of Silicon Valley entrepreneur and award-winning designer Joseph Oliver (formerly Poynter, foster child of Peter and Catherine McQueen).
