= Exercise Tiger (1942) =

Army-level military exercise

The 1942 Exercise Tiger was the code name for an Army-level military exercise held by British Commonwealth forces in the United Kingdom during the Second World War.

In April 1941, when Lieutenant-General Montgomery became commander of South-Eastern Command in the United Kingdom, he conducted the largest military exercise to date in the United Kingdom, Exercise Tiger, in May 1942, a combined forces operation involving 100,000 troops. Troops participating in Tiger noted that it was particularly gruelling for the infantry involved, who marched over 100 miles over the course of the exercises.
