= Philip Gregson-Ellis =

British Army general (1898–1956)

Major-General Philip Gregson-Ellis CB OBE
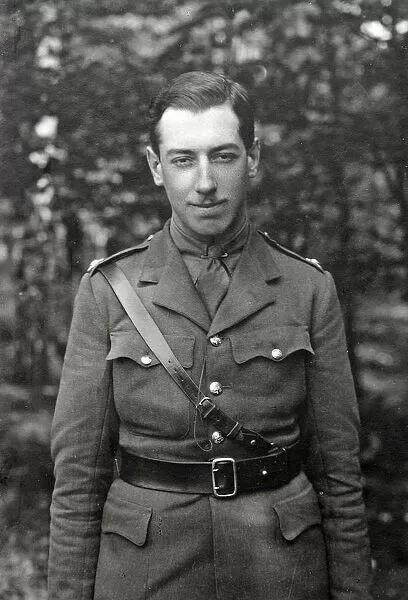
- Gregson-Ellis in 1923
- Born: 31 August 1898; Edinburgh, Scotland
- Died: 20 October 1956 (aged 58); Kent, England
- Military career
- Allegiance: United Kingdom
- Branch: British Army
- Service years: 1917–1950
- Rank: Major-General
- Service number: 15399
- Unit: Grenadier Guards
- Commands: 44th (Home Counties) Infantry Division (1947–1950); Staff College, Camberley (1944–1946); 5th Infantry Division (1944, 1946–1947); 1st (Guards) Brigade (1943–1944); 30th Armoured Brigade (1943); 2nd Battalion, Grenadier Guards (1940)
- Conflicts: First World War; Second World War
- Awards: Companion of the Order of the Bath; Officer of the Order of the British Empire

Major-General Philip George Saxon Gregson-Ellis, CB, OBE (31 August 1898 – 20 October 1956) was a senior British Army officer who saw active service during both the First World War and the Second World War, where he commanded the 5th Infantry Division during the Italian Campaign in 1944.

== Military career ==
Born in Edinburgh in August 1898, and coming from a military family, Philip Gregson-Ellis was educated at Eton College and later entered the Royal Military College at Sandhurst during the First World War. It was from here that he was commissioned as a second lieutenant into the British Army's Grenadier Guards in December 1917, and with whom he saw service on the Western Front.

He remained in the army after the war, and, during the interwar period, attended the Staff College at Camberley from 1928 to 1929 and, after serving as brigade major of the 5th Infantry Brigade in 1931, served in the same role with the 1st Guards Brigade from 1932 to 1934. He was then appointed an instructor at the Staff College in 1937, where he would remain for another two years.

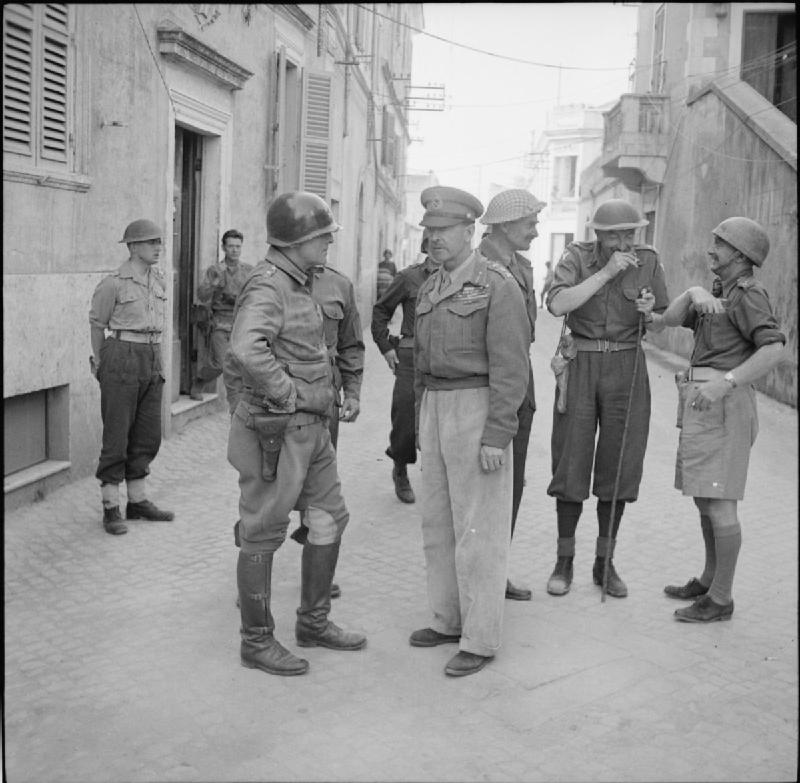
General Sir Harold Alexander with Major General Lucian Truscott and other senior Allied commanders at Anzio, Italy, 5 May 1944. Major General John Hawkesworth is pictured on the far right wearing a parachutist helmet, and to the left of him is Major General Philip Gregson-Ellis.

Gregson-Ellis served in the Second World War as a general staff officer with the British Expeditionary Force in France before becoming commanding officer of the 2nd Battalion, Grenadier Guards in 1940. He continued his war service as a brigadier on the staff in Northern Ireland from 1941 and as deputy chief of staff for Home Forces in 1942 before taking command of the 30th Armoured Brigade in January 1943. He then assumed command of the 1st (Guards) Brigade in July, which was then serving in North Africa. He was appointed general officer commanding (GOC) 5th Infantry Division in January 1944 and commanded the division in the Italian campaign, leading it in the Battle of Anzio and Operation Diadem.

After the war Gregson-Ellis returned to the Staff College, Camberley, as commandant, and then went back to the 5th Division for a second tour as its commander. He was appointed GOC 44th (Home Counties) Infantry Division in 1947 and finally retired from the British Army in 1950.

== Family ==
In 1921 Gregson-Ellis married Joan Henllys Lloyd.

== Bibliography ==
- Smart, Nick (2005). Biographical Dictionary of British Generals of the Second World War. Barnesley: Pen & Sword. ISBN 1844150496.

Military offices
Preceded by Gerard Bucknall	GOC 5th Infantry Division; January–November 1944	Succeeded by Richard Hull
Preceded by Douglas Wimberley	Commandant of the Staff College, Camberley; 1944–1946	Succeeded by Richard Hull
Preceded by Richard Hull	GOC 5th Infantry Division; 1946–1947	Succeeded by John Churcher
Preceded by Hugh Stockwell	GOC 44th (Home Counties) Infantry Division; 1947–1950	Succeeded by Brian Kimmins
