= Thomas Wilson (British Army officer, born 1896) =

Major-General Thomas Wilson CB DSO MC
- Born: 20 March 1896; Lymington, Hampshire, England
- Died: 15 May 1961 (aged 65)
- Military career
- Allegiance: United Kingdom
- Branch: British Army
- Service years: 1914–1946
- Rank: Major-General
- Nickname: "Val"
- Service number: 8864
- Units: King's Royal Rifle Corps; Machine Gun Corps
- Commands: School of Infantry (1942–1943); 9th Infantry Brigade (1942); 3rd Infantry Brigade (1939–1940); 2nd Battalion, King's Royal Rifle Corps (1938–1939)
- Conflicts: First World War; Anglo-Irish War; Second World War
- Awards: Companion of the Order of the Bath; Distinguished Service Order; Military Cross; Mentioned in despatches (2)

Major-General Thomas Needham Furnival Wilson, CB, DSO, MC (20 March 1896 − 15 May 1961) was a British Army officer who saw service in both the First and Second World Wars.

== Military career ==
Born in Lymington, Hampshire, England, on 20 March 1896, Thomas Wilson was educated at West Downs School and Winchester College. He then went to the Royal Military College, Sandhurst, from where he received a commission as a second lieutenant into the King's Royal Rifle Corps (KRRC) on 11 November 1914, and was given the service number of 8864. He saw service in the First World War on the Western Front, mainly with the 1st Battalion, KRRC, which then formed part of the 6th Brigade of the 2nd Division. During his service he was promoted to lieutenant on 14 October 1915, and captain on 22 April 1918 (with seniority backdated to 11 February 1917), was wounded in action, awarded the Military Cross (MC) in February 1917, and awarded the Distinguished Service Order (DSO) and mentioned in despatches, both in 1919. The citation for his MC, which appeared in The London Gazette in February 1917, reads:

For conspicuous gallantry in action. He reorganised a few men and led them forward with great gallantry, capturing an enemy trench together with 60 prisoners.

Remaining in the army during the interwar period, Wilson served in Ireland with the 2nd Battalion, KRRC during the Anglo Irish War. He married in 1922 and attended the Staff College, Camberley, from 1928 to 1929. Among his fellow students there included several who would become general officers during the Second World War, such as Gerald Templer, John Harding, Richard McCreery, Gerard Bucknall, Charles Miller, Alexander Galloway, Alexander Cameron, Philip Gregson-Ellis, Charles Murison, Claude Nicholson, William Holmes, I. S. O. Playfair and Gordon MacMillan. After graduating from Camberley Wilson served briefly again with the 2nd Battalion, KRRC before being sent to the War Office, where he served as a General staff Officer Grade 3 (GSO3) from January 1931 until March 1932.

Promoted on 1 January 1932 to the brevet rank of major, and major on 27 July 1932, Wilson served for just under three years, from March 1932 to January 1935, as Commander of the Company of Gentleman Cadets at the Royal Military College, Sandhurst. Promoted to the brevet rank of lieutenant-colonel on 1 January 1936, he then returned to the War Office, this time serving as Deputy Assistant Adjutant-General, from February 1936. Relinquishing this post on 18 January 1938, he was made Military Assistant to the Chief of the Imperial General Staff (CIGS), then General Lord Gort. On 1 August 1938 he was promoted to lieutenant-colonel and succeeded Lieutenant-Colonel Evelyn Barker, a fellow KRRC officer and student at the Staff College, as commanding officer (CO) of the 2nd Battalion, KRRC. The battalion was then serving in England as part of the Mobile Division (later the 1st Armoured Division), then under Major-General Roger Evans. Wilson commanded the battalion until the outbreak of the Second World War in September 1939.

Wilson remained in this position until late December 1939, when he was sent to France to succeed Brigadier Henry Curtis, a few KRRC officer, in command of the 3rd Infantry Brigade, part of Major-General Harold Alexander's 1st Infantry Division, then serving as part of the British Expeditionary Force (BEF). Wilson led the 3rd Brigade throughout the Battle of France and the Battle of Dunkirk and the subsequent Dunkirk evacuation in mid-1940.

Wilson's next appointment was as Brigadier General Staff (BGS) with Scottish Command, which he held until March 1942 when he took command of the 9th Infantry Brigade, a post he only held until July 1942. He commanded the School of Infantry at Barnard Castle, County Durham in July 1942, assisted by Colonel James Mardall. January 1943 saw him posted to the War Office in London where he was made Director of Infantry, along with a promotion in March to acting major-general. He retired from the army in 1946, the year after the war ended and the same year in which he re-married, after having divorced his first wife. In addition to being a member of the Marylebone Cricket Club, he was also Secretary to the King's Jubilee Trust from 1948 until his death in May 1961, at the relatively young age of 65.

== Bibliography ==
- Smart, Nick (2005). Biographical Dictionary of British Generals of the Second World War. Barnsley, South Yorkshire: Pen and Sword Books. ISBN 1844150496.

Military offices
New command	Commandant of the School of Infantry; 1942–1943	Succeeded by Henry Walter Houldsworth
