= James Mardall =

English cricketer and British Army officer (1899–1988)

Personal information
- Full name: James Henry Thrale Mardall
- Born: 7 November 1899; Harpenden, Hertfordshire, England
- Died: 10 July 1988 (aged 88); Colchester, Essex, England
- Batting: Right-handed
- Bowling: Right-arm slow

Domestic team information
- Years: Team
- 1931–1932: Hertfordshire

Career statistics
Competition	First-class
Matches	1
Runs scored	1
Batting average	0.50
100s/50s	–/–
Top score	1
Catches/stumpings	2/–
- Source: Cricinfo, 13 April 2019

James Henry Thrale Mardall (7 November 1899 – 10 July 1988) was an English first-class cricketer and British Army officer. Mardall served in the Royal Fusiliers for thirty years, during which he saw action in the Second World War. He also played first-class cricket for the British Army cricket team.

== Life and military career ==
Mardall was born at Harpenden and was educated at Aldenham School, before attending the Royal Military College, Sandhurst. He graduated from Sandhurst in December 1918, entering into the Royal Fusiliers as a second lieutenant. He was promoted to the rank of lieutenant in December 1920. He was later promoted to the rank of captain in April 1929.

He made his only appearance in first-class cricket for the British Army cricket team against the Marylebone Cricket Club at Lord's in 1931. Batting twice in the match, he was dismissed in the Army's first-innings without scoring by James Powell, while in their second-innings he was dismissed for a single run by the same bowler. In the same year, he debuted in minor counties cricket for Hertfordshire in the Minor Counties Championship against Berkshire, with Mardall making a total of four minor counties appearances in 1931–32.

He was promoted to the rank of major in August 1938. Mardall served during the Second World War, gaining the temporary ranks of lieutenant colonel in 1940, with promotion to the rank of colonel following in 1942. He assisted Brigadier T. N. F. Wilson at the newly founded infantry school at Barnard Castle School in July 1942. In November 1944, he gained the full rank of lieutenant colonel. He retired from active service in August 1948, upon which he was granted the honorary rank of colonel. He exceeded the age for recall in August 1956 and was removed from the reserve of officers. Mardall died at Colchester in July 1988.
