= Gordon MacMillan =

British Army general (1897–1986)

General Sir Gordon MacMillan KCB KCVO CBE DSO MC**
- Portrait by Leonard Boden, Argyll and Sutherland Highlanders Museum, Stirling Castle
- Born: 7 January 1897; Bangalore, Kingdom of Mysore, India
- Died: 21 January 1986 (aged 89); Renfrewshire, Scotland
- Burial place: Newington Cemetery, Edinburgh, Scotland
- Relatives: Sir John MacMillan (son)
- Military career
- Allegiance: United Kingdom
- Branch: British Army
- Service years: 1915–1955
- Rank: General
- Nickname: "Babe"
- Service number: 5880
- Unit: Argyll and Sutherland Highlanders
- Commands: Governor of Gibraltar (1952–1955); Scottish Command (1949–1952); British Forces in Palestine and Trans-Jordan (1947–1948); 51st (Highland) Infantry Division (1945); 49th (West Riding) Infantry Division (1944–1945); 15th (Scottish) Infantry Division (1943–1944); 152nd Infantry Brigade (1943); 12th Infantry Brigade (1943); 199th Infantry Brigade (1941)
- Conflicts: First World War; Anglo-Irish War; Second World War; Palestine Emergency
- Awards: Knight Commander of the Order of the Bath; Knight Commander of the Royal Victorian Order; Commander of the Order of the British Empire; Distinguished Service Order; Military Cross & Two Bars; Mentioned in Despatches (2); Grand Officer of the Order of Orange-Nassau (Netherlands)

General Sir Gordon Holmes Alexander MacMillan of MacMillan and Knap, KCB, KCVO, CBE, DSO, MC & Two Bars (7 January 1897 – 21 January 1986) was a Scottish professional soldier who rose to become a general in the British Army. As a young officer during the First World War, he displayed outstanding bravery and was awarded a Military Cross and two Bars. At the age of 19 and while still a second lieutenant, he was appointed acting adjutant of the 2nd Battalion, Argyll and Sutherland Highlanders. Between the World Wars, MacMillan remained in the army, occupying posts of increasing seniority. He married Marian Blakiston Houston in 1929, and they had one daughter and four sons.

During the Second World War, MacMillan served initially in England, putting in place defensive strategies against a possible invasion by the Germans. He was appointed Brigadier, General Staff IX Corps in December 1941, remaining in this post during the Operation Torch landings in North Africa and through to the fall of Tunis in May 1943. He was given command of the 152nd Brigade in June 1943 and led it during the successful Sicily campaign. Upon return to Britain, he was assigned command of the 15th (Scottish) Division and led the formation during the Battle of Normandy, Operation Epsom and Operation Bluecoat, towards the end of which he was wounded. Once recovered, in November 1944, he returned to mainland Europe as GOC 49th (West Riding) Division near Nijmegen. Upon the death of Major-General Thomas Rennie, he assumed command of the 51st (Highland) Division immediately following the crossing of the Rhine on 23 March 1945.

After the war, MacMillan served as the army's Director of Weapons and Development. In February 1947 he was appointed GOC British Forces in Palestine and Trans-Jordan. Soon after his arrival, the British Government decided to bring to an end its Mandate in Palestine. This decision triggered an escalation of violence in the territory, leading to the withdrawal of all British forces by 30 June 1948. He then served as GOC Scottish Command (1949–52). His final army posting was as Governor and Commander-in-Chief Gibraltar (1952–55).

Gordon MacMillan was hereditary Chief of the Clan MacMillan. After retirement, he remained Colonel of the Argyll and Sutherland Highlanders until 1958. Following his retirement, he immersed himself in Scottish life and society, being appointed chairman of several institutions. Much of his time was devoted to the upkeep of the house, gardens and woodlands at Finlaystone, the family house in the West of Scotland.

== Early life and First World War ==
Gordon Holmes Alexander MacMillan was born near Bangalore, Kingdom of Mysore, India, on 7 January 1897. His father, Dugald MacMillan, was a coffee plantation owner. However, when he was three years old, his parents, both of Scottish origin, decided to return to Britain to bring up their only son. At the age of ten, he joined St Edmund's School, Canterbury, from where he won a Prize Cadetship to attend a shortened course at the Royal Military College, Sandhurst, in April 1915, several months after the outbreak of the Great War.

MacMillan was commissioned as a second lieutenant into the Argyll and Sutherland Highlanders on 11 August 1915.

Due to not having reached the age of 19, he was posted to the 3rd Battalion, Argylls, a training unit, stationed near Edinburgh. In April 1916 he was sent to the Western Front where he joined the 2nd Battalion (the 93rd), a Regular Army unit which was then serving as part of the 98th Brigade of the 33rd Division, in Northeast France, and immediately became involved in fierce trench warfare at Brickstacks.

This was followed by engagements, as part of the battles of the Somme and Passchendaele, at Cuinchy, Bazentin-le-Petit, High Wood, Mametz Wood, Arras, Le Cateau and the Selle.

While still only 19 years old and a second lieutenant, he was appointed acting adjutant of the battalion in November 1916. He was promoted to lieutenant in April 1917, and formally confirmed as adjutant in June. He remained in this post for the rest of the war, serving seven different commanding officers (CO). The casualties were immense and, at one time, while a second lieutenant, he found himself by default commanding the battalion. MacMillan wrote "I would say that I was fortunate to belong to the best battalion in the Army, with an unbreakable spirit. You can see this from the record of their operations – and then look at the casualty list: 63 officers and 1175 men killed, and ready for anything at the end of it all".

MacMillan was one of only 168 soldiers to receive the Military Cross (MC) and two Bars in the First World War. His MCs were awarded for exceptional gallantry in the battles of High Wood (July 1916), Arras (April 1917) and Le Cateau (October 1918)

== Between the wars ==
After the war, MacMillan, having gained a Regular commission in 1915, remained in the army, continuing to serve as his battalion's adjutant until December 1920, when the battalion was stationed in Ireland during "The Troubles". He was promoted to captain on 28 August 1924, serving periodically as a company commander before entering the Staff College, Camberley from 1928 to 1929, where among his fellow students there in his year included several future high-ranking officers, such as Alexander Galloway, Gerard Bucknall, John Harding, Richard McCreery, Philip Gregson-Ellis, William Holmes, Claude Nicholson, Charles Murison, Alexander Cameron, Gerald Templer, Thomas Wilson, I. S. O. Playfair and Leslie Beavis. His instructors included Henry Pownall, Wilfrid Lindsell, Richard O'Connor, Harold Franklyn, Bernard Paget, George Giffard and Bernard Montgomery. On 10 August 1929, MacMillan married Marian Blakiston Houston; they had five children. He went on to serve successively as captain, staff captain and General staff Officer Grade 3 (GSO3) in the War Office in the early 1930s.

Having rejoined his regiment, from August to October 1934 (with the rank of brevet major), he commanded the Guard for the Royal Family at Balmoral. His next appointment, in 1935, was as an instructor (GSO 2) at the Royal Military College of Canada in Kingston, Ontario, where he served for two years before rejoining his regiment and then returning to the War Office as a GSO 2 in the Training Branch. He was promoted to major on 1 August 1938, and, from 10 January 1939, served as a GSO2 to the staff of HQ Eastern Command.

== Second World War ==
On 10 April 1940, seven months after the outbreak of the Second World War, MacMillan was promoted to acting lieutenant-colonel and appointed as GSO1 in HQ 55th (West Lancashire) Motor Division, a first line Territorial Army (TA) formation. The division was commanded by Major-General Vivian Majendie, who was some eleven years MacMillan's senior, and was serving in Northern Command (soon moving to Eastern Command). The division was a motorised infantry formation composed of only two, rather than three, brigades, and was among several responsible for coastal defence and for engaging any possible enemy airborne landings in the event of a German invasion. In late June, after the British Expeditionary Force (BEF) was evacuated from Dunkirk and the fall of France, the division – composed initially of the 164th and 165th Infantry Brigades with supporting divisional troops – was reorganised as a standard infantry division with the addition of the 199th Infantry Brigade from the disbanded 66th Infantry Division.

In May the following year, with the division, now under Major-General William Morgan and serving in East Anglia under Lieutenant-General Hugh Massy's XI Corps, being still concerned mainly with home defence, MacMillan was promoted, on 1 May 1941, to the acting rank of brigadier (and acting colonel on the same date) and took up command of the 55th Division's 199th Brigade. He trained the brigade very hard over the next few months in numerous large-scale exercises until, in late December 1941, he was chosen to be Brigadier General Staff (BGS) in the HQ of IX Corps District. Initially the corps, commanded by Lieutenant-General Francis Nosworthy, was involved in coastal defences, supporting Eastern Command, but was soon to become engaged in preparing itself for the Allied invasion of French North Africa, codenamed Operation Torch.

=== North Africa and Sicily ===
The corps, commanded by Lieutenant-General John Crocker (nine years younger than Nosworthy) from September 1942, embarked from the Tail of the Bank in February 1943 and set themselves up near Algiers in French North Africa on 24 March as part of the 18th Army Group reserve. The corps, serving as part of Lieutenant-General Kenneth Anderson's British First Army, fought three major battles (Fondouk, Goubellat and Kournine) during the final stages of the Tunisian campaign against German troops and travelled 470 miles over six weeks before entering Tunis on 7 May, just days before the campaign ended, with almost 250,000 Axis soldiers surrendering. On 27 April Crocker, the corps commander, was badly injured and unable to continue in command. He was replaced temporarily by Lieutenant-General Brian Horrocks. MacMillan was later appointed a Commander of the Order of the British Empire (CBE) for what Crocker described in his citation as his "very high order" of service in the command structure of IX Corps during the campaign. The CBE was awarded on 5 August 1943.

With IX Corps HQ disbanded, MacMillan was transferred briefly as BGS to the First Army headquarters, whose responsibilities included arranging for the victory parade on 20 May 1943 which involved some 26,000 Allied troops of various nationalities. Following the parade, on 17 June, he was posted to command the 12th Infantry Brigade, taking over from Brigadier Richard Hull, part of the 4th Mixed Division, then commanded by Major-General John Hawkesworth. The division had come under IX Corps command for the final stages of the campaign and so MacMillan was familiar with it. However, just eight days later, he was given command of the 152nd Infantry Brigade, one of three brigades – the others being the 153rd under Brigadier Horatius Murray and the 154th under Brigadier Thomas Rennie – making up the veteran 51st (Highland) Infantry Division, which was then commanded by Major-General Douglas Wimberley Under Wimberley's command the division had fought during the Second Battle of El Alamein and throughout North Africa, notably in Egypt, Libya and Tunisia, as an integral part of the British Eighth Army, commanded by General Sir Bernard Montgomery, who had been one of MacMillan's instructors at the Staff College, Camberley in the late 1920s, and had formed a good opinion of him.

The 51st Division was selected by Montgomery to take part in the Allied invasion of Sicily, codenamed Operation Husky, where it came under Lieutenant-General Sir Oliver Leese's XXX Corps. Just 19 days after his appointment, MacMillan led the brigade in the Allied landings in Sicily at Portopalo Bay on 10 July. Initially facing little resistance, the brigade's first major action was on 13 July at the village of Francoforte against German paratroopers of the Hermann Göring Division and, although the village was eventually taken after very difficult fighting, the brigade suffered very heavy casualties. The 152nd Brigade then, having suffered less casualties than the 153rd and 154th Brigades, led the division's drive forward to Paternò on 31 July, part of an attempt to break out towards Mount Etna. The following day it was clear that the Germans were on the retreat and later abandoned Sicily, with little major combat being seen afterwards and the campaign ending on 17 August. He was also awarded the Distinguished Service Order (DSO) for his performance in this campaign, awarded on 18 November 1943. The award was recommended by General Montgomery and General The Hon. Sir Harold Alexander, commanding the Allied 15th Army Group.

=== Northwest Europe ===
Soon after returning to the United Kingdom from Sicily, MacMillan received a promotion to acting major-general on 27 August 1943 and received his first divisional command of the war when he succeeded Major-General Charles Bullen-Smith as the General Officer Commanding (GOC) of the 15th (Scottish) Infantry Division, a second line TA formation. The division was created in September 1939 as a second line TA duplicate of the first line 52nd (Lowland) Infantry Division, initially composed of the 44th, 45th and 46th Infantry Brigades and supporting divisional troops. However, in November 1941, the division had been placed on the Lower Establishment, meaning the division received a low priority for equipment and supplies and, throughout 1942, had had to supply drafts for British forces in the Middle East and the Far East. In January 1943 the 6th Guards Tank Brigade replaced the 45th Brigade and the division, raised in March to the Higher Establishment, was then converted into a mixed division, of one armoured and two infantry brigades. A month after MacMillan's assumption of command, the division was reconstituted as a standard infantry division of three brigades, composed now of the 44th, 46th and 227th Infantry Brigades, and containing battalions from eight of the ten Scottish infantry regiments.

Slated for participation in Operation Overlord, codename for the Allied invasion of Normandy, the 15th Division, under MacMillan, was engaged in highly intensive training in North Yorkshire, before moving to Sussex in April 1944 in preparation for the invasion. The division formed part of VIII Corps, then commanded by Lieutenant-General John Harding, a fellow student at the Staff College in the late 1920s, itself forming part of the British Second Army, under Lieutenant-General Sir Kenneth Anderson. Both VIII Corps and the Second Army formed part of the 21st Army Group, initially commanded by General Sir Bernard Paget, who had been an instructor at the Staff College. However, in January 1944, Harding, Anderson and Paget were all replaced. Harding was succeeded by Lieutenant-General Sir Richard O'Connor, another ex-Staff College instructor who greatly admired MacMillan, Anderson by Lieutenant-General Miles Dempsey, and Paget by General Sir Bernard Montgomery. MacMillan was briefly appointed as acting GOC of VIII Corps while O'Connor arrived to replace Harding.

The division landed in Normandy, near the city of Caen, on 13 June 1944, just a week after the D-Day landings (delayed by six days due to storms in the English Channel), and deployed west of Caen in preparation for Montgomery's upcoming offensive, Operation Epsom. O'Connor's VIII Corps, with the 11th Armoured and 43rd (Wessex) Divisions, in addition to the 15th Division, under command, was given the role of attacking between Caen and Tilly-sur-Seulles, crossing the river Odon and advance to the river Orne. MacMillan's division, with each of his brigades being supported by a Churchill tank equipped regiment of the 31st Tank Brigade, was to play a major role and his plan was for the 46th and 44th Brigades to capture the villages of Cheux on the right and Saint-Mauvieux on the left. This would allow the 227th Brigade to pass through and seize the bridges across the Odon at Gavrus and Tourmaville. However, the Normandy bocage countryside was ideal for defence, and, despite strong artillery support, the 44th and 46th Brigades encountered heavy resistance on 26 June, the first day of the operation. On the evening of the following day, the 2nd Battalion, Argyll and Sutherland Highlanders (of 227th Brigade), ignoring the threat to their flanks, dashed to the Tourmaville bridge, which the battalion captured intact. The battalion had created a small bridgehead, allowing elements of the 11th Armoured Division to pass through and seize Hill 112, beyond the Odon river. The battalion then captured the Gavrus bridge but immediately came under heavy attack. The "Scottish Corridor", which the Argylls' bridgehead across the river Odon marked the end, and which was now 2,500 yards wide, forced O'Connor, the corps commander, to send in reinforcements to hold it. The operation, although unsuccessful in its objective of penetrating as far as the Orne, it had drawn in the Germans' armoured reserves. MacMillan's division was relieved and sent to a more peaceful area, where the division, which had sustained some 2,300 casualties, including 288 killed, began to re-equip and absorb battle casualty replacements. Despite the very heavy losses, the division was believed by MacMillan's superiors to have performed very well, with Montgomery on 3 July sending him a message stating:

I would like to congratulate you personally, and the 15th Division as a whole on the very fine performance put up during the past week's fighting. The Division went into battle for the first time in this war, but it fought with great gallantry and displayed a fine offensive spirit. Scotland can feel pride in the 15th (Scottish) Division and the whole Division can be proud of itself.

Dempsey, the army commander, and O'Connor, MacMillan's corps commander, gave similar praise.

The next two weeks the division supported the 43rd Division during its attempts to capture Hill 112 in Operation Jupiter, which was followed by its participation in Operation Greenline, part of the Second Battle of the Odon. Like Epsom, it again attracted German armour but did not succeed. After a brief rest the division, on 23 July, transferred to XXX Corps, under Lieutenant-General Gerard Bucknall, another fellow student at the Staff College in the late 1920s, and saw further very tough action to secure the Bois du Homme as part of Operation Bluecoat at the end of July/beginning of August. On 3 August, MacMillan was wounded in the knee by shrapnel and evacuated to England, later Broadstone Hospital, Port Glasgow. That evening, Lieutenant-General O'Connor, GOC VIII Corps, who greatly admired MacMillan wrote in the following words to his wife: "Babe is slightly wounded. It is a tragedy as he has been the mainstay of this party, and stands out head and shoulders above everyone else. He is one of the best, if not the best, and commands the best lot out here. This is beyond dispute. I shall miss him as a friend, collaborator and adviser. Most of the success out here has been the result of his initial efforts." Command of the division passed to Brigadier Colin Barber, formerly commander of the 46th Brigade. MacMillan was appointed a Companion of the Order of the Bath for "his excellent example and untiring efforts" during the period following the landings.

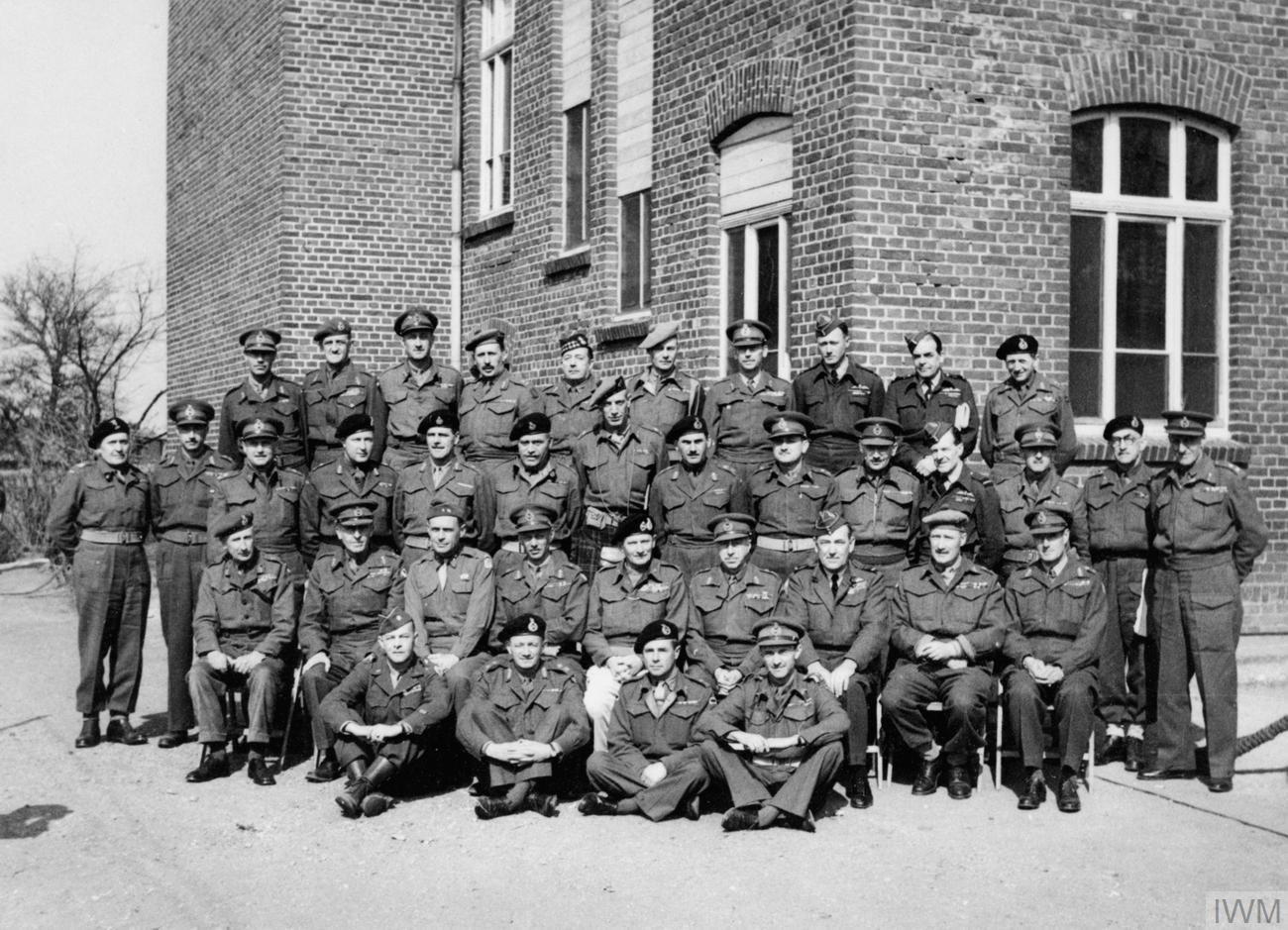
Field Marshal Sir Bernard Montgomery poses for a group photograph with his staff, corps and divisional GOCs at Walbeck, Germany, 22 March 1945. Pictured standing in the back row, fifth from the right, is Major-General Gordon MacMillan.

Once pronounced fit in November, MacMillan, whose rank of major-general was made temporary on 27 August 1944, became GOC of the 49th (West Riding) Infantry Division, succeeding Major-General Evelyn Barker, another fellow Staff College student who was promoted to become GOC of VIII Corps in place of O'Connor, who was being sent to India.

Like MacMillan's former command, the 49th Division (nicknamed "The Polar Bears" due to its divisional insignia), with Major Christopher Welby-Everard (later a lieutenant-general) as its GSO1, was another TA formation, composed of the 56th, 146th and 147th Infantry Brigades and supporting divisional troops. The division, serving as part of Lieutenant-General Guy Simonds's II Canadian Corps, part of General Harry Crerar's First Canadian Army, was assigned to hold an area known as "the Island", near Nijmegen in the Netherlands, against German advances in the aftermath of Operation Market Garden. Several minor skirmishes took place during the wet and bitterly cold winter. The division had just launched an offensive to drive the Germans out of their remaining positions when MacMillan was ordered to become GOC of the 51st (Highland) Division in place of his friend, Major-General Tom Rennie, who had commanded the 154th Brigade in Sicily when MacMillan commanded the 152nd Brigade. Rennie had been killed by mortar fire during the crossing of the Rhine on 23 March.

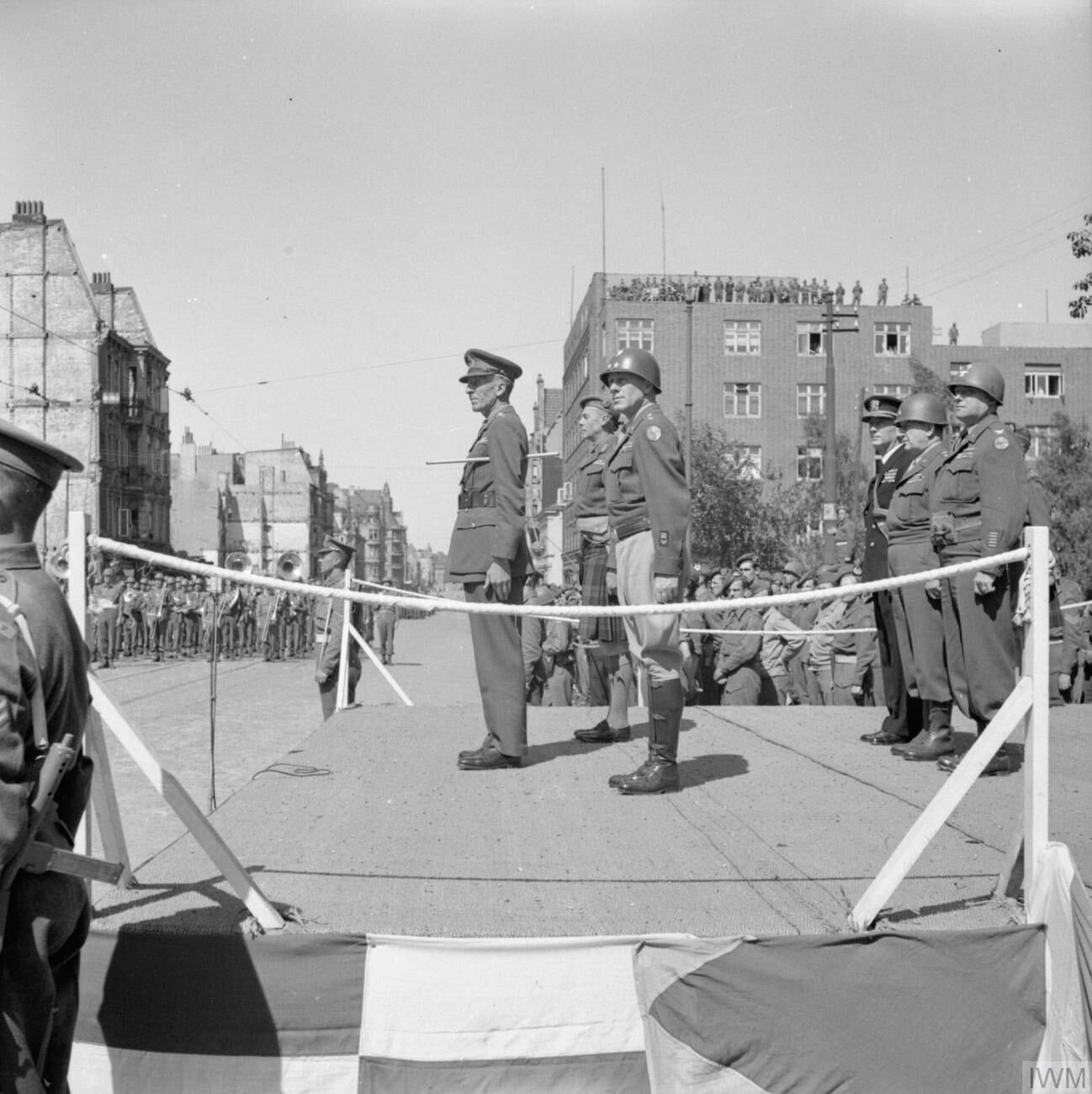
Lieutenant-General Brian Horrocks, GOC XXX Corps, Major-General Gordon MacMillan, GOC 51st Division, and Major General Charles H. Gerhardt, GOC US 29th Division, on the saluting base during the ceremony to mark the handover of Bremerhaven by British to American forces.

Assuming command the day after, the division, serving as part of Lieutenant-General Brian Horrocks's XXX Corps, itself part of Dempsey's British Second Army, was engaged in a number of hard-fought battles as it moved swiftly north-eastwards into Germany until the German surrender on 8 May 1945 and the end of World War II in Europe. MacMillan then led his troops in the victory parade in Bremerhaven on 12 May. He was subsequently made a Grand Officer of the Dutch Order of Orange-Nassau for his "exceptional valour, leadership, loyalty and outstanding devotion to duty and great perseverance" during the liberation of the Netherlands. He was also mentioned in despatches for "gallant and distinguished service" on two occasions, on 9 August 1945 and 4 April 1946.

== After the war ==
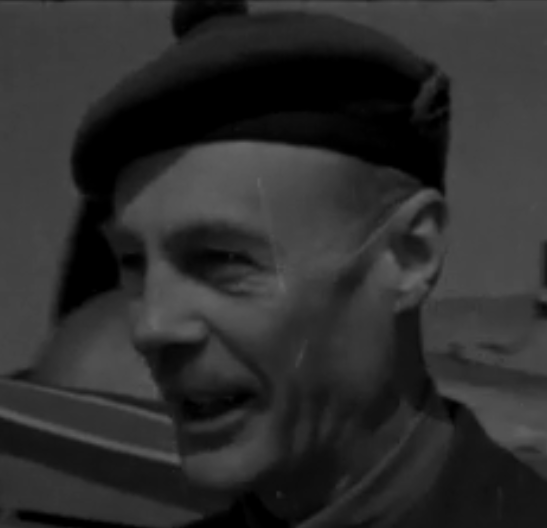
MacMillan in Palestine, 1947.

As soon as the war ended, MacMillan was ordered to return to the United Kingdom and, handing over the 51st Division to Major-General James Cassels, was appointed Director of Weapons and Development on the General Staff at the War Office in London. He was also made Colonel of the Argyll and Sutherland Highlanders on 1 October 1945.

MacMillan was promoted to the acting rank of lieutenant-general on 10 February 1947, and, three days later, took up his duties as GOC British Forces in Palestine and Trans-Jordan, replacing Lieutenant-General Sir Evelyn Barker, who he had succeeded as GOC of the 49th Division in November 1944, and who was then being sent home amid allegations of having had an affair and his antisemitic order following the King David Hotel Bombing in July 1946. While there, MacMillan was promoted to lieutenant-general on 17 November 1947. One unnamed journalist described this as "perhaps the most unpleasant job that has ever fallen to the lot of a British general" but went on to observe that the newly promoted Lieutenant-General MacMillan is "quiet, efficient, yet capable of divine wrath when the need arises: he is a great leader and is both loved and respected by his subordinates."

Just five days after his arrival, the House of Commons was informed that the British government had decided to place the question of the future of Palestine before the United Nations. This meant that MacMillan would be the last GOC. It set the stage for the end of the British Mandate in Palestine in May 1948 and for an increasingly violent struggle between the Jews and the Arabs.

The head of the civilian government in Palestine was the High Commissioner, Sir Alan Cunningham, while the GOC was responsible for maintaining law and order with a force of over 100,000 troops, an army of more or less the same size as the whole British Army at the beginning of the 21st century. His period in Palestine was marked by increasingly divergent views between the local administration and the British Cabinet in London on the role of the army. MacMillan recognised the increasing futility of trying to keep the peace between two parties committed to war rather than to cohabitation, and the need to prioritise arrangements for the safe, orderly and timely evacuation of all troops and other British residents as well as 270,000 tons of military equipment and stores. He was the target of three assassination attempts by Palestinian Jews, and he was criticised fiercely by Arabs and Jews respectively for his failure to intervene in time to stop the Deir Yassin massacre and the attack on the Hadassah convoy.

Following the end of the British Mandate and the Declaration of the Establishment of the State of Israel (both on 14 May 1948), the pace of British withdrawal increased. MacMillan boarded a naval launch in Haifa that would take him to HMS Phoebe on 30 June 1948, "the last man of the British Forces to leave Palestine".

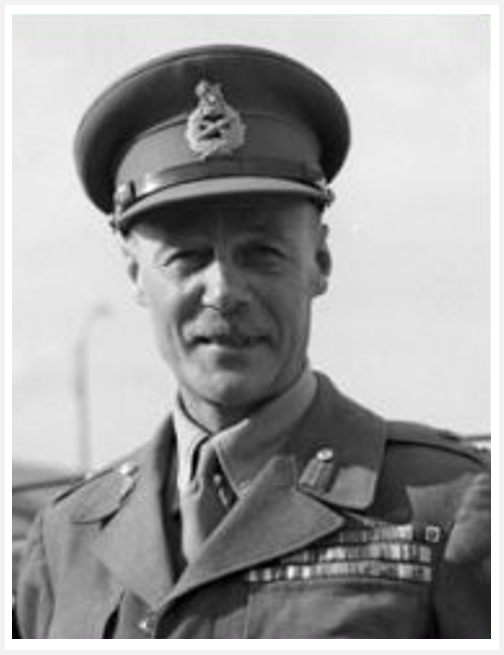
General Sir Gordon MacMillan as Governor of Gibraltar.

In January 1949 MacMillan was knighted as a Knight Commander of the Order of the Bath and appointed GOC-in-C of Scottish Command and Governor of Edinburgh Castle, where his office was located. This came at a time when the army was adjusting to peacetime conditions.

From 1952 until his retirement from the army in 1955, he served as Governor and Commander-in-Chief of the City and Garrison of Gibraltar. On 1 January 1954 MacMillan was promoted to the rank of general. This was a period of rising tension between Spain under Franco and Britain over the sovereignty of Gibraltar, which was not eased by the visit in 1954 of the Queen and the Duke of Edinburgh on the last leg of their tour of the Commonwealth. During this visit, the Queen invested MacMillan on the Royal Yacht Britannia as a Knight Commander of the Royal Victorian Order (KCVO) on 25 May 1954.

== Retirement ==
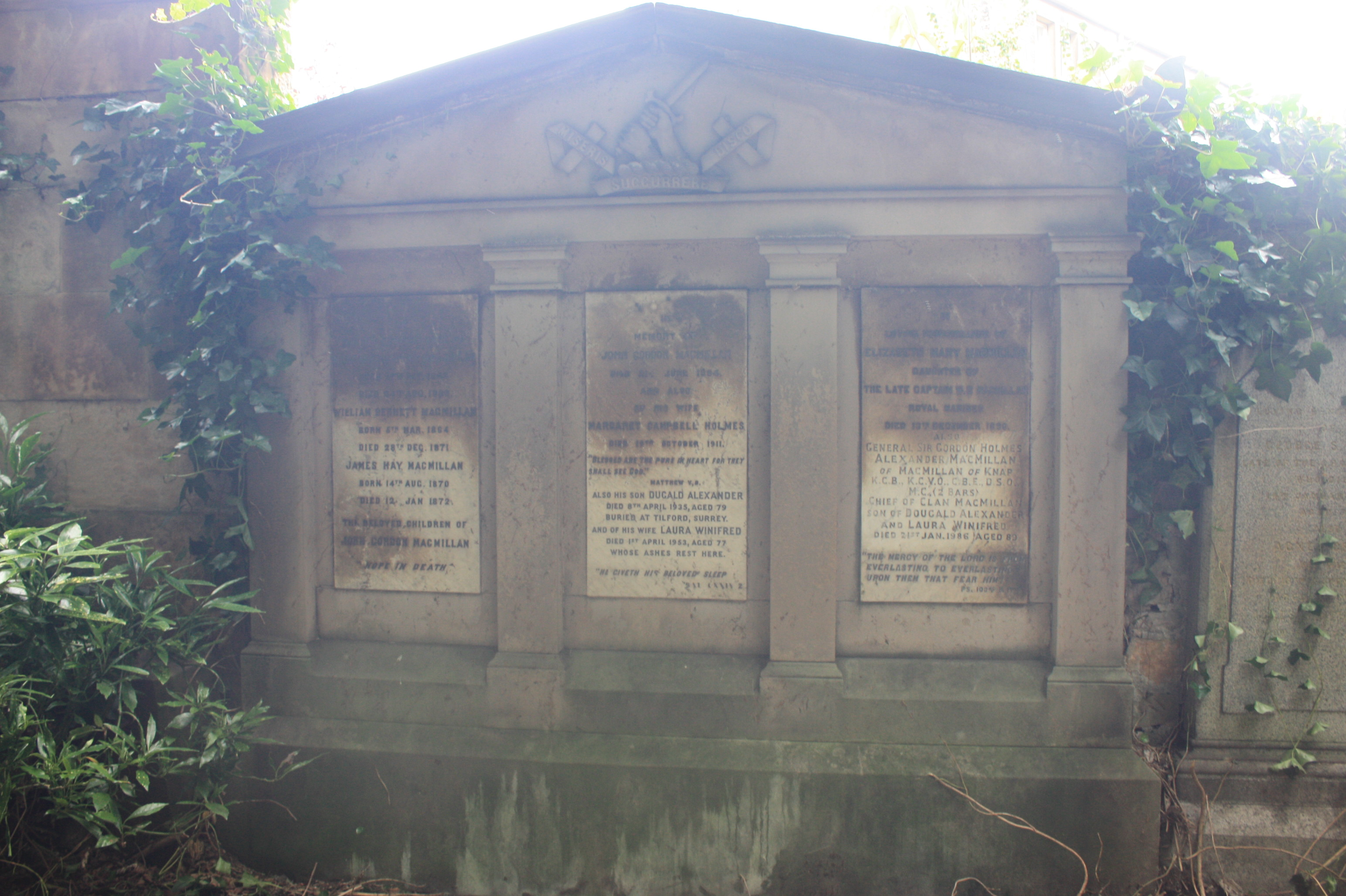
The grave of General Sir Gordon MacMillan, Newington Cemetery, Edinburgh.

From 1955 MacMillan lived at Finlaystone, his wife's family home on the southern bank of the River Clyde, near the village of Langbank in Scotland. His family, consisting of his wife Marian, daughter Judy and four sons, George, John, David and Andrew, had been based here during the Second World War and the Palestine assignment. Apart from doing much, including a lot of manual work, to maintain and improve the house, its garden and the surrounding estate, he immersed himself in Scottish affairs. He continued as Colonel of the A&SH until 1958, and subsequently led a successful campaign to save the regiment from disbandment in 1968. He also served for many years as one of the Commissioners of the Queen Victoria School, Dunblane, of which he had been ex-officio chairman when GOC Scotland.

Relieved of his military duties, MacMillan was able to devote more time to Clan MacMillan matters, arranging gatherings at Finlaystone and frequently visiting Clan members in North America. He was appointed Her Majesty's Vice-Lieutenant for the County of Renfrew in 1955.

MacMillan also served as Chairman of the Greenock Harbour Trust and of the Firth of Clyde Drydock at the time of its establishment. He was appointed the first Chairman of the Cumbernauld Development Corporation, responsible for building a "new town" between Glasgow and Stirling. From 1955 to 1980, he also chaired the executive committee of Erskine Hospital which had been created as a hospital and care home for ex-service men and women in the First World War. Other voluntary work involved him as chairman of the Scottish Police Dependants' Fund and the City of Glasgow Council of Social Service. He was awarded an honorary doctorate in law (LLD) by the University of Glasgow in 1969.

MacMillan died in a car accident on 21 January 1986, just two weeks after his eighty-ninth birthday.

He is buried against the north wall in the highly overgrown section of Newington Cemetery in Edinburgh but a path has been created to his grave.

== Bibliography ==
- Baynes, John (1989). The Forgotten Victor: General Sir Richard O'Connor KT, GCB, DSO, MC. London: Brassey's. ISBN 978-0-08-036269-4.
- Ben-Yehuda, Nachman (1992). Political Assassination by Jews: A Rhetorical device for Justice. State University of New York Press. ISBN 978-0-79-141166-7.
- MacMillan, George; MacMillan, John; MacMillan, Judy; MacMillan, David; MacMillan, Andrew (2013). General Sir Gordon MacMillan of MacMillan and Knap, KCB KCVO CBE DSO MC LLD: The Babe, (1897–1986). Peterborough: FastPrint Publishing. ISBN 978-178035-577-1.
- Mead, Richard (2007). Churchill's Lions: A Biographical Guide to the Key British Generals of World War II. Stroud: Spellmount. ISBN 978-1-86227-431-0.
- Smart, Nick (2005). Biographical Dictionary of British Generals of the Second World War. Barnsley: Pen & Sword. ISBN 978-1-84-415049-6.

Military offices
Preceded by Charles Bullen-Smith	GOC 15th (Scottish) Infantry Division; 1943–1944	Succeeded by Colin Barber
Preceded by Evelyn Barker	GOC 49th (West Riding) Infantry Division; 1944–1945	Succeeded by Stuart Rawlins
Preceded by Thomas Rennie	GOC 51st (Highland) Infantry Division; March–May 1945	Succeeded by James Cassels
Honorary titles
Preceded by Gervase Thorpe	Colonel of the Argyll and Sutherland Highlanders; 1945–1958	Succeeded by Frederick Graham
Military offices
Preceded by Sir Evelyn Barker	GOC British Forces in Palestine and Trans-Jordan; 1947–1948	End of British mandate
Preceded by Sir Philip Christison	GOC-in-C Scottish Command; 1949–1952	Succeeded by Sir Colin Barber
Government offices
Preceded by Sir Kenneth Anderson	Governor of Gibraltar; 1952–1955	Succeeded by Sir Harold Redman
