= Robert Haining =

General Sir Robert Haining KCB DSO JP
- Born: 28 July 1882; Chester, Cheshire
- Died: 15 September 1959 (aged 77); Surrey, England
- Military career
- Allegiance: United Kingdom
- Branch: British Army
- Service years: 1901–1942
- Rank: General
- Service number: 22446
- Unit: Royal Artillery
- Commands: Western Command (1939–1940); British Forces in Palestine and Trans-Jordan (1938–1939); Imperial Defence College (1935–1936)
- Conflicts: First World War; Second World War
- Awards: Knight Commander of the Order of the Bath; Distinguished Service Order; Mentioned in Despatches (6)

General Sir Robert Hadden Haining, KCB, DSO, JP (28 July 1882 – 15 September 1959) was a senior British Army officer during the Second World War.

== Early life and education ==
Haining was born in Chester, the eldest son of Dr. William Haining and Mary Ellen Roberts. He was educated at Uppingham School and at the Royal Military Academy, Woolwich.

== Military career ==
After Woolwich, Haining was commissioned into the Royal Artillery in 1900.

He served during the First World War, where he was awarded the Distinguished Service Order (DSO) in 1915 and mentioned in despatches six times throughout the war. In November 1914 he was seconded and made a staff captain.

After attending the Staff College, Camberley from 1920 to 1921, he returned there as an instructor from 1922 to 1924. Haining was appointed Assistant Adjutant and Quartermaster General for the 2nd Division based at Aldershot in 1928.

He then became GSO1 of the 4th Division at Colchester in January 1930. He served in Military Operations in the War Office from 1931 to 1933, becoming deputy director of Military Operations and Intelligence at the War Office in 1933. He became Commandant of the Imperial Defence College in 1935 and Director of Military Operations and Intelligence at the War Office in 1936. He was appointed General Officer Commanding British Forces in Palestine and Trans-Jordan in 1938.

At the outbreak of the Second World War, Haining was appointed General Officer Commanding-in-Chief Western Command and moved on to be Vice Chief of the Imperial General Staff in 1940. He was appointed Intendant General for Middle East Forces in 1941: Prime Minister Winston Churchill described the role of an Intendant General to be that of "serving the Commander-in-Chief with the largest possible measure of supplies". He retired from the British Army in 1942.

Haining was Colonel Commandant of the Royal Artillery from 1939 to 1950.

== Retirement and death ==
In retirement Haining became active in civil life and was Lord Lieutenant of Surrey.

Haining died in September 1959, aged 77.

Following his death, his friend George Richard Hodges Nugent (later Baron Nugent of Guildford) wrote to The Times to remark on Haining's character and post-retirement life:

When he resigned from the Army, despite weighty grounds for complaint, he wasted no time in repining but immediately made himself available for public work of all kinds, from the parish to the county. His talents and personality were not allowed to be wasted for long; he quickly became chairman of his local Bench of Magistrates, a county councillor, and, in 1949 Lord Lieutenant of the county of Surrey, besides a host of lesser appointments. There was no function so great that his presence did not add distinction to it. and no function too small for him to give his time and energy to it. Every day was a working day for him. Saturdays and Sundays, included, and the number of British Legion parades and services, large and small, attended by him must be legion indeed! When he returned home after his last evening engagement he would embark on his large personal and official correspondence, all written in his own strong characteristic handwriting, for secretarial staff was not within his means. His outstanding gift was his broad human sympathy and understanding: every-one great or small who met him felt that they met him on the level and could trust him absolutely. His great energy, shrewd common sense and active brain will be much missed from a wide range of administrative work in the county. Even more, his warm, lovable personality will be missed by a multitude of men and women in every walk of life who knew him as their friend.

— G. R. H. Nugent, The Times, 23 September 1959

== Bibliography ==
- Smart, Nick (2005). Biographical Dictionary of British Generals of the Second World War. Barnesley: Pen & Sword. ISBN 1844150496.

Military offices
Preceded by Sir Lionel Preston	Commandant of the Imperial Defence College; 1935–1936	Succeeded by Sir Arthur Longmore
Preceded by John Dill	Director of Military Operations and Intelligence; 1936–1938	Succeeded by Henry Pownall
Preceded by Archibald Wavell	GOC British Forces in Palestine and Trans-Jordan; 1938–1939	Succeeded by Michael Barker
Preceded by Sir Henry Jackson	GOC-in-C Western Command; 1939–1940	Succeeded by Sir Henry Jackson
Preceded by Sir John Dill	Vice Chief of the Imperial General Staff; 1940–1941	Succeeded by Sir Henry Pownall
Honorary titles
Preceded by Sir Malcolm Fraser	Lord Lieutenant of Surrey; 1949–1957	Succeeded by The Earl of Munster
