= John D'Arcy (British Army officer) =

British Army general

Lieutenant-General John D'Arcy CBE MC
- Born: 12 February 1894
- Died: 1 February 1966 (aged 71)
- Relatives: Charles D'Arcy (father)
- Military career
- Allegiance: United Kingdom
- Branch: British Army
- Service years: 1914–1946
- Rank: Lieutenant-General
- Service number: 10058
- Units: Royal Field Artillery; Royal Artillery
- Commands: British Forces in Palestine and Trans-Jordan; 9th Armoured Division; 9th Support Group; 69th Medium Regiment, Royal Artillery
- Conflicts: First World War; North-West Frontier; Second World War; Palestine Emergency
- Awards: Commander of the Order of the British Empire; Military Cross; Mentioned in Despatches

Lieutenant-General John Conyers D'Arcy, CBE, MC (12 February 1894 – 1 February 1966) was a senior British Army officer who served in both the First and Second World Wars, where he commanded the 9th Armoured Division.

== Military career ==
Born the son of the Most Reverend Charles D'Arcy, D'Arcy was commissioned into the Royal Field Artillery in 1914. He fought in the First World War, where he was wounded twice during his service. While on leave he saw active service with the British Army during the Easter Rising, leading the attack on the General Post Office, Dublin. He was wounded on the North-West Frontier of India in 1931 and awarded the Military Cross.

D'Arcy served again in the Second World War, commanded the 9th Armoured Division in the United Kingdom from 1942 onwards. After the division was disbanded in 1944, he was promoted to the rank of lieutenant-general and became General Officer Commanding British Forces in Palestine and Trans-Jordan from 1944. He retired in 1946.

He lived at Hyde Park in County Westmeath, Ireland.

== Family ==
In 1920 D'Arcy married Noël Patricia Wakefield; they had two sons.

== Bibliography ==
- Smart, Nick (2005). Biographical Dictionary of British Generals of the Second World War. Barnesley: Pen & Sword. ISBN 1844150496.

Military offices
Preceded by Brian Horrocks	GOC 9th Armoured Division; 1942–1944	Post disbanded
Preceded by Douglas McConnel	GOC British Forces in Palestine and Trans-Jordan; 1944–1946	Succeeded by Sir Evelyn Barker
