= Diana Wellesley, Duchess of Wellington =

British aristocrat and WWII intelligence agent

Her Grace The Duchess of Wellington MBE
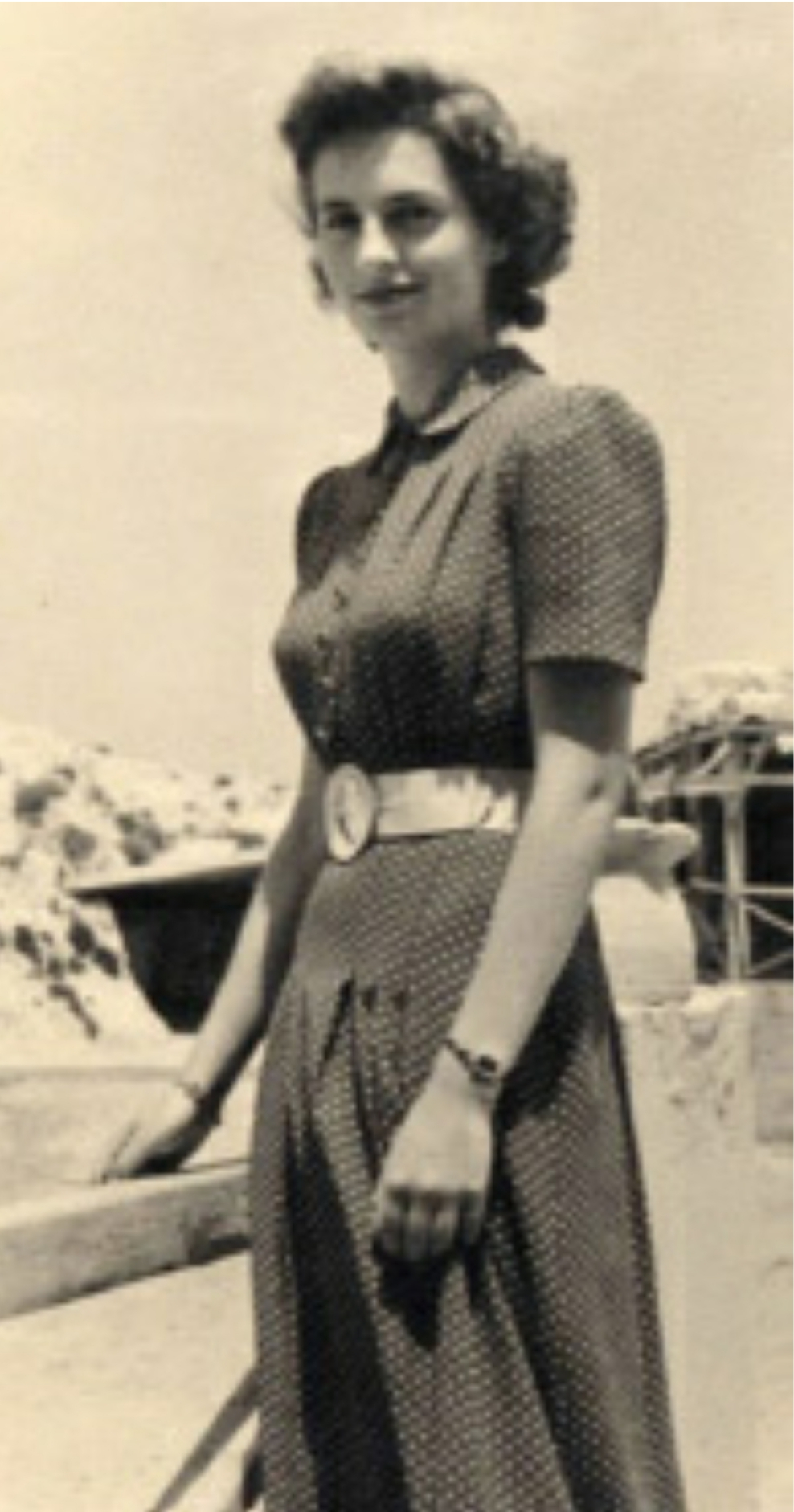

Personal details
- Born: Diana Ruth McConnel; 14 January 1922 Woolwich, London, England
- Died: 1 November 2010 (aged 88) Apsley House, London, England
- Spouse: Valerian Wellesley, 8th Duke of Wellington (m. 1944)
- Children: Charles Wellesley, 9th Duke of Wellington; Lord Richard Wellesley; Lady Jane Wellesley; Lord John Wellesley; Lord James Wellesley
- Parent(s): Douglas McConnel; Ruth Garnett-Botfield

Diana Ruth Wellesley, Duchess of Wellington, MBE (née McConnel; 14 January 1922 – 1 November 2010) was the wife of Valerian Wellesley, 8th Duke of Wellington, and a British intelligence officer during World War II.

== Family and early life ==
Born in Woolwich, she was the only daughter of Major-General Douglas McConnel, an instructor at the Royal Military Academy, and his wife, Ruth Mary (née Garnett-Botfield). Her only brother died soon after birth, and she had no other siblings.

She resolved not to marry a military man after living apart from her father, though she did live happily with her parents in India for two years. On her return to Britain she was educated at Benenden, where she enjoyed painting and music and proved proficient at maths. Her decision to learn typing instead of cooking would serve her well in the war, which broke out shortly before she left school. She was only seventeen, not yet finished school, when the Second World War broke out.

She lived in Jerusalem when her father was stationed there. She worked as a secretary for the military in the King David Hotel and served often as her father's aide-de-camp. Her work included passing top secret documents, such as plans for a British invasion of Iraq in 1941 to nullify Arab nationalists who believed that the Nazis could help their cause.

== Marriage and family ==
It was there that she met Valerian Wellesley, who in 1943 became Marquess of Douro when his father, then Lord Gerald Wellesley, inherited the Dukedom of Wellington from his nephew. They were married on 28 January 1944. The Marquess and Marchioness of Douro would have five children:

- Arthur Charles Valerian Wellesley, 9th Duke of Wellington, 10th Duke of Ciudad Rodrigo (b. 19 August 1945), married HRH Princess Antonia of Prussia, a great-granddaughter of Wilhelm II, German Emperor, with five children;
- Lord Richard Wellesley, (b. 20 June 1949), married Joanna Sumner, with two daughters;
- Lady (Caroline) Jane Wellesley (b. 6 July 1951), Television producer; she was courted at one time by Charles, Prince of Wales;
- Lord John Wellesley (b. 20 April 1954), married Corinne Vaes, with two children;
- Lord James Wellesley (b. 16 December 1964), married Laura Wedge, with one daughter, divorced; married Emma Nethercott.

During the course of her regular work Diana discovered a plot by the Stern Gang to bomb St. George's Cathedral, Jerusalem on her wedding day. The bomb was retrieved but the couple still received a police escort, which Lord Douro believed to be the standard procedure at the wedding of a general's daughter, his bride not having revealed the plot to him at the time.

The wedding had been precipitated by his posting to Italy and later that year she learnt that he was returning home and arranged to join the same convoy of boats heading to Britain. As luck would have it, they were on neighbouring boats and at six o’clock each day he would position himself on the bow of his ship and she on the stern of hers, and they would communicate messages of endearment in the darkness with a torch using Morse code, much to the amusement of those on board who could decipher the messages.

== After the war ==
Lord Douro continued his military service, attaining the rank of brigadier, and Lady Douro lived with him in Cyprus in the 1950s and Madrid from 1964 to 1967. He retired from the army in 1967 and they moved to Stratfield Saye. In 1972 Lord Douro's father died and he and his wife became Duke and Duchess of Wellington. At home the Duchess tended personally to the gardens and was amused to be mistaken frequently for a gardener when their home was open to the public.

The Duchess died at the family home, Apsley House, in London on 1 November 2010, aged 88. She lived to see the births of several of her great-grandchildren, including twins Lady Mae and Arthur, Viscount Wellesley, third in the direct line of succession to the dukedom.
