= Douglas McConnel =

British general

Major-General Douglas McConnel CB CBE DSO DL
- Born: 9 June 1893; Derbyshire, England
- Died: 7 February 1961 (aged 67)
- Burial place: Colmonell, Ayrshire, Scotland
- Relatives: Diana Wellesley, Duchess of Wellington (daughter)
- Military career
- Allegiance: United Kingdom
- Branch: British Army
- Service years: 1912–1947
- Rank: Major-General
- Service number: 8040
- Unit: Royal Artillery
- Commands: Lowland District (1945–46); British Troops in Palestine and Trans-Jordan (1941–44)
- Conflicts: First World War; Arab revolt in Palestine; Second World War
- Awards: Companion of the Order of the Bath; Commander of the Order of the British Empire; Distinguished Service Order; Mentioned in Despatches (3)

Major General Douglas Fitzgerald McConnel, CB, CBE, DSO, DL (9 June 1893 – 7 February 1961) was a senior British Army officer who served as General Officer Commanding British Troops in Palestine and Trans-Jordan.

== Military career ==
Born the son of William Holdsworth McConnel, a Royal Navy officer, and Florence Emma (née Bannister). He was born with a twin brother, George Malcolm, who died in 1908. Douglas was educated at Winchester College and then entered the Royal Military Academy, Woolwich. He played in the Association Football XI in 1910–11 and the Lord's XI in 1911.

After passing out from Woolwich, McConnel was commissioned as a second lieutenant into the Royal Artillery on 20 December 1912, alongside future generals Ivor Thomas, William Mirrlees, William Morgan, all fellow artillerymen, and Christopher Woolner of the Royal Engineers. He served in the First World War, in France and Palestine, during which he was mentioned in despatches three times, awarded the Distinguished Service Order in 1917, and promoted to lieutenant on 22 May 1915 and captain on 20 December 1916. McConnel ended the war in 1918 as a major.

After the war McConnel became a staff captain at the School of Artillery in 1920, the same year in which he married. After attending the Staff College, Camberley, from 1925 to 1926, he served as a brigade major with the Quetta Infantry Brigade from 1927 to 1931. He then went on to be officer commanding the Gentlemen Cadets at the Royal Military Academy, Woolwich, a general staff officer at the Royal Army Service Corps Training Centre in 1933 and a general staff officer at the Staff College in 1936.

McConnel served in the Second World War, initially as a GSO in Mandatory Palestine during the final stages of the Arab revolt, and Trans-Jordan and then from 1941 as general officer commanding (GOC) of British Troops in Palestine and Trans-Jordan. He was promoted to the acting rank of brigadier on 22 February 1940 and, in July, he was mentioned in despatches. He was promoted to the acting rank of major-general on 16 October 1941, and temporary major-general on 16 October 1942. After the war he became district officer commanding Lowland District in Scotland and aide-de-camp general to King George VI. He retired from the army in 1947.

McConnel lived at Knockdolian House between Ballentrae and Colmonell in Ayrshire. He served as a deputy lieutenant for Ayrshire in 1953.

== Family ==
McConnel married Ruth Mary Garnett-Botfield, daughter of Major Walter Dutton Garnett-Botfield and Susan Katherine (née McConnel). They had one daughter, Diana, who became the Duchess of Wellington.

== Bibliography ==
- Smart, Nick (2005). Biographical Dictionary of British Generals of the Second World War. Barnesley: Pen & Sword. ISBN 1844150496.

Military offices
| Preceded by Sir Henry Maitland Wilson | GOC British Forces in Palestine and Trans-Jordan; 1941–1944 | Succeeded by John D'Arcy |
