= Palestine Command =

British Forces in Palestine and Trans-jordan
- Active: 1922–1948
- Country: United Kingdom
- Branch: British Army
- Type: Command
- Part of: British Army
- Garrison/HQ: Jerusalem

Commanders
- Last commander: Gordon MacMillan
- Notable commanders: Sir Archibald Wavell

The British Troops in Palestine and Trans-jordan was a British Army command in Mandatory Palestine and the Emirate of Transjordan.

== History ==
The command was formed in February 1922 to control all British forces in Mandatory Palestine. In 1930, following an outbreak in hostilities between the Jewish and Arab populations, 2nd Battalion, South Staffordshire Regiment and the 1st Battalion, Northamptonshire Regiment were deployed to Palestine. In September 1936, following the outbreak of Arab Revolt, Lieutenant-General Sir John Dill was despatched there.

In August 1937 Major General Archibald Wavell CB was transferred to Palestine, where there was growing unrest, to be General Officer Commanding (GOC) British Forces in Palestine and Trans-Jordan. He was promoted to Lieutenant-General on 21 January 1938.

After the Second World War, the growing of the Jewish insurgency in Mandatory Palestine made tensions increased further and 1st Infantry Division arrived in Palestine. Later 6th Airborne Division was dispatched as the Imperial Strategic Reserve. In May 1948 the United Kingdom's mandate ended and British troops fully withdrew the following month.

== Commanders ==
Commanders were as follows:

- 1936–1937 Lieutenant-General Sir John Dill, appointed General Officer Commanding (GOC) of The British Forces in Palestine and Trans-jordan, 8 September 1936
- August 1937–1938 Lieutenant-General Archibald Wavell, General Officer Commanding, The British Forces in Palestine and Trans-Jordan
- 1938–1939 Lieutenant-General Robert Haining
- 1939–1940 Lieutenant-General Michael Barker
- 1940–1940 Lieutenant-General George Giffard
- 1940–1941 Lieutenant-General Philip Neame
- 1941–1941 General Sir Henry Maitland Wilson
- 1941–1944 Major-General Douglas McConnel
- 1944–1946 Lieutenant-General John D'Arcy
- 1946–1947 Lieutenant-General Sir Evelyn Barker
- 1947–1948 Lieutenant-General Gordon MacMillan

== See also ==
- 6th Airborne Division in Palestine
