= Michael Barker (British Army officer) =

British Army general

Lieutenant-General Michael Barker CB DSO* DL
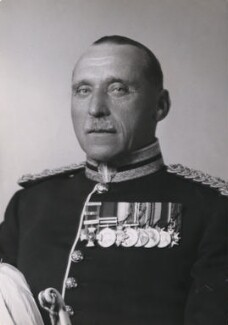
- Born: 15 October 1884; Wells, Somerset, England
- Died: 21 May 1960; Colchester, Essex, England (aged 75 years)
- Military career
- Allegiance: United Kingdom
- Branch: British Army
- Service years: 1903–1941
- Rank: Lieutenant-General
- Service number: 6187
- Units: East Surrey Regiment; Lincolnshire Regiment; York and Lancaster Regiment
- Commands: Aldershot Command (1940); I Corps (1940); British Forces in Palestine and Trans-Jordan (1939–1940); 2nd Battalion, York and Lancaster Regiment (1927–1931); 53rd Brigade (1918–1919); 11th (Service) Battalion, West Yorkshire Regiment (1916–1918)
- Conflicts: Second Boer War; First World War; Arab revolt in Palestine; Second World War
- Awards: Companion of the Order of the Bath; Distinguished Service Order & Bar; Mentioned in Despatches (6); Legion of Honour (France)

Lieutenant-General Michael George Henry Barker, CB, DSO & Bar, DL (15 October 1884 – 21 May 1960) was a British Army officer who fought in both world wars, notably as commander of I Corps during the Battle of France in May 1940.

== Early life and military career ==
Michael Barker was born on 15 October 1884 in Wells, Somerset. He joined the British Army as a second lieutenant in the 4th (Militia) Battalion, East Surrey Regiment on 28 February 1902, and served with this battalion in South Africa during the Second Boer War, returning home in October 1902.

After his return, he took a regular commission in the Lincolnshire Regiment in 1903. He served as an adjutant in May 1910.

He served throughout the First World War with the Lincolnshire Regiment and was awarded the Distinguished Service Order in 1917 and a Bar to the award in 1918, ending the war the following year as a lieutenant colonel. He was promoted to the temporary rank of brigadier general and succeeded Harold Higginson as general officer commanding of a brigade on 26 April 1918.

== Between the wars ==
Soon after the end of the First World War, Barker, promoted in January 1919 to brevet lieutenant colonel, attended the Staff College, Camberley, and later relinquished his temporary rank of lieutenant colonel on 13 February 1924. He trabsferred on 22 March 1927 as a lieutenant colonel into the York and Lancaster Regiment and commanded the 2nd Battalion, York and Lancaster Regiment, from 1927 to 1931 before being promoted to brigadier as a staff officer at Eastern Command. He became director of recruiting and organization at the War Office in 1936 and British Forces in Palestine and Trans-Jordan in 1939, during the final stages of the Arab revolt in Palestine. He was promoted to lieutenant general, which was antedated to 7 June 1935.

== Second World War ==
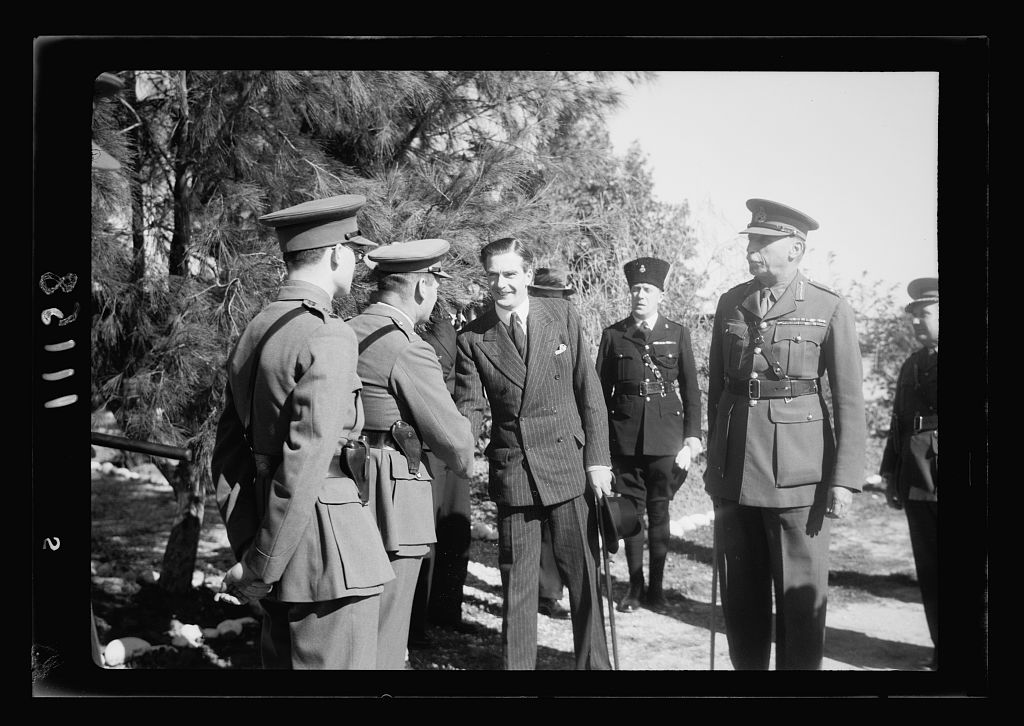
Arrival in Palestine of Anthony Eden. Mr. Antony Eden being introduced to Army officers by Lieutenant General M. G. H. Barker, February 1940.

During the Second World War, Barker served as commander of I Corps from April 1940, before being replaced during the latter stages of the Battle of Dunkirk by Major General The Hon. Harold Alexander, commanding the 1st Division. His performance there was undistinguished; according to Alan Brooke, commanding II Corps, Barker suffered a nervous breakdown; he was "overwrought with work (and was) impossible to deal with". His then-subordinate, Bernard Montgomery, remarked that "only a madman would give a corps to Barker." His active military service was finished, and he served for a year as head of Aldershot Command before retiring from the army later that year.

Barker died in 1960, aged 75, in Colchester, Essex.

== Personal life ==
Barker married Barbara Maude Bentall in Essex in October 1914. He was the father of Michael John Eustace Barker (1915–1995) who became a merchant sailor and was, allegedly, the lover of Stephen Spender and, later, W. H. Auden for a time during the Second World War. "Jack", as he was known, wrote an autobiography, "No Moaning There!", published in 1962.

== Bibliography ==
- Smart, Nick (2005). Biographical Dictionary of British Generals of the Second World War. Barnsley, South Yorkshire: Pen and Sword Books. ISBN 1844150496.
- Alanbrooke, Field Marshal Lord (2001). Danchev, Alex; Todman, Daniel (eds.). War Diaries 1939–1945. Phoenix Press. ISBN 1-84212-526-5.

Honorary titles
Preceded by William Clemson	Colonel of the York and Lancaster Regiment; 1936–1946	Succeeded by George Symes
Military offices
Preceded by Robert Haining	GOC British Forces in Palestine and Trans-Jordan; 1939–1940	Succeeded by George Giffard
Preceded by Sir John Dill	GOC I Corps; April–May 1940	Succeeded by Sir Harold Alexander
Preceded by Sir Charles Broad	GOC-in-C Aldershot Command; 1940	Succeeded by Sir Geoffrey Raikes
