= 9th Armoured Division (United Kingdom) =

- Formation sign of the 9th Armoured Division.
- Active: 1 December 1940–31 July 1944
- Country: United Kingdom
- Branch: British Army
- Type: Armoured
- Size: 14,964 men 227 tanks (Note: 201 tanks and 26 anti-aircraft tanks.) (Note: These two figures are the war establishment, the on-paper strength, of the division; for information on how divisions size changed over the war please see British Army during the Second World War and British Armoured formations of World War II.)

Commanders
- Notable commanders: Major-General Brian Horrocks

The 9th Armoured Division was an armoured division of the British Army, raised during the Second World War. It never saw active service during the war as a complete division.

== History ==
The 9th Armoured was created on 1 December 1940 and dispersed and disbanded on 31 July 1944. It saw no active service during the war as a division, although its 27th armoured brigade fought in the Normandy campaign and NW Europe in 1944.

== General Officer Commanding ==
The 9th Armoured Division had three men who held the position of General Officer Commanding during the Second World War.

Appointed	General Officer Commanding
4 December 1940	Major-General Brocas Burrows
20 March 1942	Major-General Brian Horrocks
12 August 1942	Major-General John D'Arcy (Note: D'Arcy was appointed as the acting General Officer Commanding on 12 August 1942 at the rank of Brigadier, he took official command of the division on 8 September 1942 with the rank of Major-General.)

== Component Units ==
Component units included:

27th Armoured Brigade (transferred from division on 10 August 1942)

- 4th/7th Royal Dragoon Guards
- 13th/18th Royal Hussars (Queen Mary's Own)
- 1st East Riding Yeomanry
- 1st Battalion, Queen Victoria's Rifles - renamed 7th Battalion, King's Royal Rifle Corps on 22 March 1941

28th Armoured Brigade

- 5th Royal Inniskilling Dragoon Guards
- 15th/19th The King's Royal Hussars
- 1st Fife and Forfar Yeomanry
- 2nd Battalion, Queen Victoria's Rifles - renamed 8th Battalion, King's Royal Rifle Corps on 22 March 1941

9th Support Group (disbanded 12 June 1942)

- 11th Battalion, Worcestershire Regiment
- 6th Regiment, Royal Horse Artillery
- 74th Anti-Tank Regiment, Royal Artillery
- 54th (Argyll and Sutherland Highlanders) Light Anti-Aircraft Regiment, Royal Artillery

7th Infantry Brigade (transferred to division on 5 June 1942)

- 2nd Battalion, South Wales Borderers
- 6th Battalion, Royal Sussex Regiment
- 2/6th Battalion, East Surrey Regiment

Divisional Troops

- 1st Royal Gloucestershire Hussars - (16 January 1943 - 10 July 1943)
- 6th Regiment, Royal Horse Artillery - (12 June 1942 - 10 July 1944)
- 141st (Queen's Own Dorset Yeomanry) Field Regiment, Royal Artillery - (12 June 1942 - 10 July 1944)
- 74th Anti-Tank Regiment, Royal Artillery - (12 June 1942 - 6 November 1943)
- 92nd (Gordon Highlanders) Anti-Tank Regiment, Royal Artillery - (12 November 1943 - 10 July 1944)
- 54th (Argyll and Sutherland Highlanders) Light Anti-Aircraft Regiment, Royal Artillery - (12 June 1942 - 2 March 1944)
- 150th (Loyals) Light Anti-Aircraft Regiment, Royal Artillery - (2 March 1944 - 10 July 1944)

== See also ==
- List of British divisions in World War II
- British Armoured formations of World War II

== Notes ==
Footnotes

Citations
