= Charles Broad (British Army officer) =

British Army General (1882–1976)

Lieutenant-general Sir Charles Broad KCB DSO
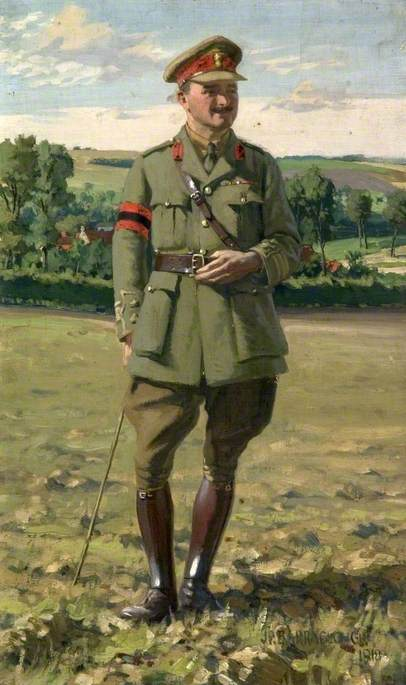
- Portrait by James Penniston Barraclough, 1918
- Born: 29 December 1882
- Died: 23 March 1976 (aged 93)
- Military career
- Allegiance: United Kingdom
- Branch: British Army
- Service years: 1901–1942
- Rank: Lieutenant-general
- Service number: 3246
- Units: Second Boer War; First World War; Second World War
- Commands: Eastern Army in India (1940–1942); Aldershot Command (1939–1940); 4th Indian Infantry Brigade (1935–1937); 1st Brigade of the Royal Tank Corps (1931)
- Conflicts: Second Boer War; First World War; Second World War
- Awards: Knight Commander of the Order of the Bath; Distinguished Service Order; Mentioned in Despatches

Lieutenant-general Sir Charles Noel Frank Broad, KCB, DSO (29 December 1882 – 23 March 1976) was a British Army general during the Second World War.

== Military career ==
The son of Major C. H. Broad, Northumberland Fusiliers, Broad was educated at Wellington College and Pembroke College, Cambridge University. He served in South Africa from 1901 to 1902 as an officer of the 3rd (Militia) Battalion, York and Lancaster Regiment.

Broad was commissioned in 1904 into the Cambridge University Volunteers, then into the Royal Field Artillery in May 1905 and went to the Staff College, Camberley in 1914.

Broad served in the First World War in France and Belgium, mostly on the staff, to which he had been seconded in April 1915. He was awarded the Distinguished Service Order in June 1917, "for distinguished service in the field." He transferred to the Royal Tank Corps in 1923 and became commander of the 1st Brigade of the Royal Tank Corps in 1931 before being appointed general officer commanding-in-chief for Aldershot Command in 1939. He became general officer commanding-in-chief for the Eastern Army in India in 1940: in that capacity he welcomed the 7th Armoured Brigade back from Burma: he retired in 1942.

Broad was also colonel commandant of the Royal Tank Regiment from 1939 to 1949.

== Bibliography ==
- Smart, Nick (2005). Biographical Dictionary of British Generals of the Second World War. Barnesley: Pen & Sword. ISBN 1844150496.

Military offices
Preceded by Sir John Dill	GOC-in-C Aldershot Command; 1939–1940	Succeeded by Michael Barker
Preceded by Sir Douglas Baird	GOC-in-C, Eastern Army, India; 1940–1942	Succeeded by Noel Irwin
