= John Dill =

British Army officer and diplomat (1881–1944)

Field Marshal Sir John Dill GCB CMG DSO
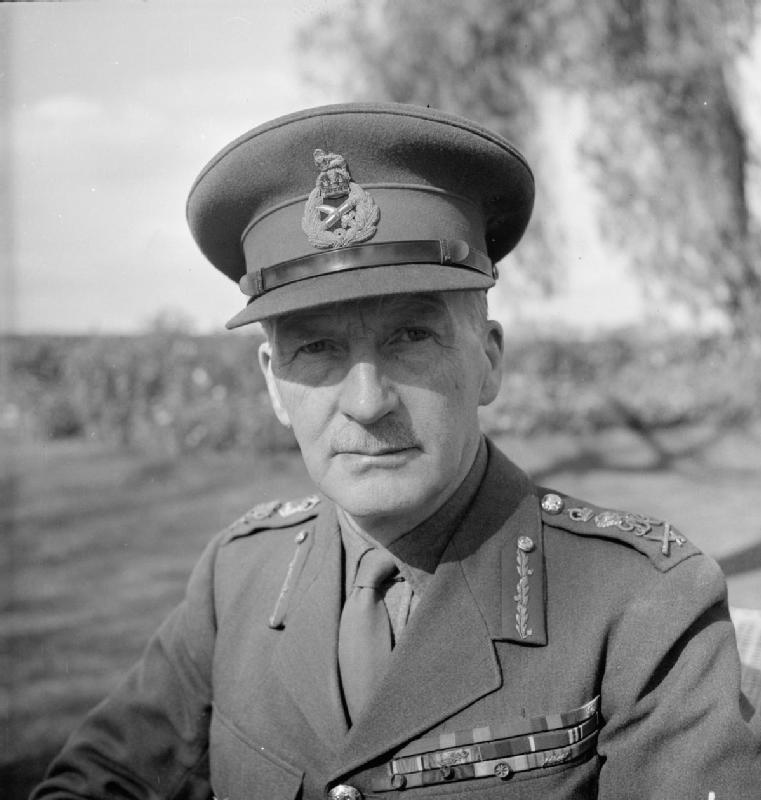
- Sir John Dill in Egypt, 18 February 1941
- Born: 25 December 1881; Lurgan, County Armagh, Ireland
- Died: 4 November 1944 (aged 62); Washington, D.C., United States
- Burial place: Arlington National Cemetery, Virginia, United States
- Military career
- Allegiance: United Kingdom
- Branch: British Army
- Service years: 1901–1944
- Rank: Field Marshal
- Service number: 6659
- Unit: Prince of Wales's Leinster Regiment (Royal Canadians)
- Commands: Chief of the Imperial General Staff (1940–41); I Corps (1939–1940); Aldershot Command (1937–1939); British Forces in Palestine and Trans-Jordan (1936–1937); Staff College, Camberley (1931–1934); 2nd Infantry Brigade (1923–1926)
- Conflicts: Second Boer War; First World War; Arab revolt in Palestine; Second World War
- Awards: Knight Grand Cross of the Order of the Bath; Companion of the Order of St Michael and St George; Companion of the Distinguished Service Order; Mentioned in Despatches (8); Army Distinguished Service Medal (United States); Officer of the Legion of Honour (France); Croix de guerre (France); Commander of the Order of the Crown (Belgium); Officer of the Order of the Crown of Romania; Grand Cross of the Order of St Olav (Norway); Order of Polonia Restituta, 1st Class (Poland)

Field Marshal Sir John Greer Dill (25 December 1881 – 4 November 1944) was a senior British Army officer with service in both the First World War and the Second World War. From May 1940 to December 1941 he was the Chief of the Imperial General Staff, the professional head of the British Army, and subsequently served in Washington, D.C., as Chief of the British Joint Staff Mission and then Senior British Representative on the Combined Chiefs of Staff.

== Early life ==
Born in Ireland in Lurgan, County Armagh, on 25 December 1881, John Greer Dill's father, also named John, (and who died when the younger John was just twelve years old) was the local bank manager and his mother, Jane, (who died just months after her husband) was a Greer from Woodville, Lurgan. With the death of both parents, "John and his sister were then cared for by an uncle, the Reverend Joseph Grundy Burton".

Always intended for a career in the armed forces, Dill, along with his sister, Nicolina Frances, attended Methodist College Belfast, from 1887 to 1889. This was followed by his education at Cheltenham College in Gloucestershire, England and the Royal Military College, Sandhurst. According to historian Richard Doherty, Dill's conduct at Sandhurst were "exemplary" although there "were no indications of the outstanding intelligence for which he would later be noted and his marks were described as mediocre".

== Early life and military career ==
From Sandhurst Dill was commissioned on 8 May 1901 as a second lieutenant into the 1st Battalion of the Leinster Regiment, one of eight Irish infantry regiments then in existence in the British Army. The newly-commissioned young officer was posted to South Africa with his battalion to see out the final stages of the Second Boer War. After the end of the war in June 1902, Dill left Cape Town with other men of his battalion on the SS Englishman in late September 1902, arriving at Southampton the following month, from where they were posted to Fermoy.

Dill, by now a lieutenant since 15 August 1903 (later antedated to 27 May), was appointed as his battalion's adjutant on 15 August 1906, having previously been assistant adjutant from 1902. Promoted to captain on 12 July 1911, and by now having "demonstrated an aptitude for staff duties", he was seconded to study at the Staff College, Camberley from 1 February 1913, and was still there on the outbreak of the First World War eighteen months later.

Staff College certainly made Dill; his talents for planning and problem solving were discovered and honed during his year at Camberley and were soon put to the toughest test of all – war.

== First World War ==
Shortly after the war began, and after having briefly serving on the staff of Southern Command, Dill, in October, became brigade major of the 25th Brigade, part of the 8th Division, which was sent to the Western Front to join the British Expeditionary Force (BEF), where Dill would remain for the rest of the war. He was present at the Battle of Neuve Chapelle in 1915 and for which he was later appointed a Companion of the Distinguished Service Order.

During 1916 Dill, promoted in May to major, served on the General Staff of the 55th (West Lancashire) Division and Canadian Corps, before being promoted to lieutenant-colonel and chief of staff (GSO1) of the 37th Division in January 1917. He was moved to the General Staff at General Headquarters in October of that year, initially as part of the Training Section but was soon shifted to the Operations Section. By the end of the war he was a temporary brigadier general, having been promoted to that rank in late March 1918, and had been mentioned in despatches eight times. From the spring of 1918 he was Head of Operations at GHQ, an important promotion after the sacking of many of Field Marshal Sir Douglas Haig's senior staff following the Battle of Cambrai. He was appointed a Companion of the Order of St Michael and St George (CMG) in the 1918 New Year Honours. He also received a number of foreign decorations for his service, including the Officer of the Legion of Honour, the French Croix de guerre, Commander of the Order of the Crown of Belgium, Officer of the Order of the Crown of Romania.

== Between the wars ==
After the war Dill, promoted to brevet colonel in June 1919, returned to the Staff College and served as an instructor there. In the 1928 New Year Honours he was appointed a Companion of the Order of the Bath (CB). In June 1928 he was appointed a temporary brigadier. In 1929 he was posted to India and in December 1930 was promoted to the permanent rank of major-general before returning to appointments at the Staff College (for in fact the third time but this time as the college's commandant).

After three years there he went to the War Office in London as Director of Military Operations and Intelligence, holding that post until 1 September 1936. Alongside his other positions, he was appointed to the largely honorary role of colonel of the East Lancashire Regiment on 24 December 1932, a position he held until his death, taking over from Major General Sir Lothian Nicholson.

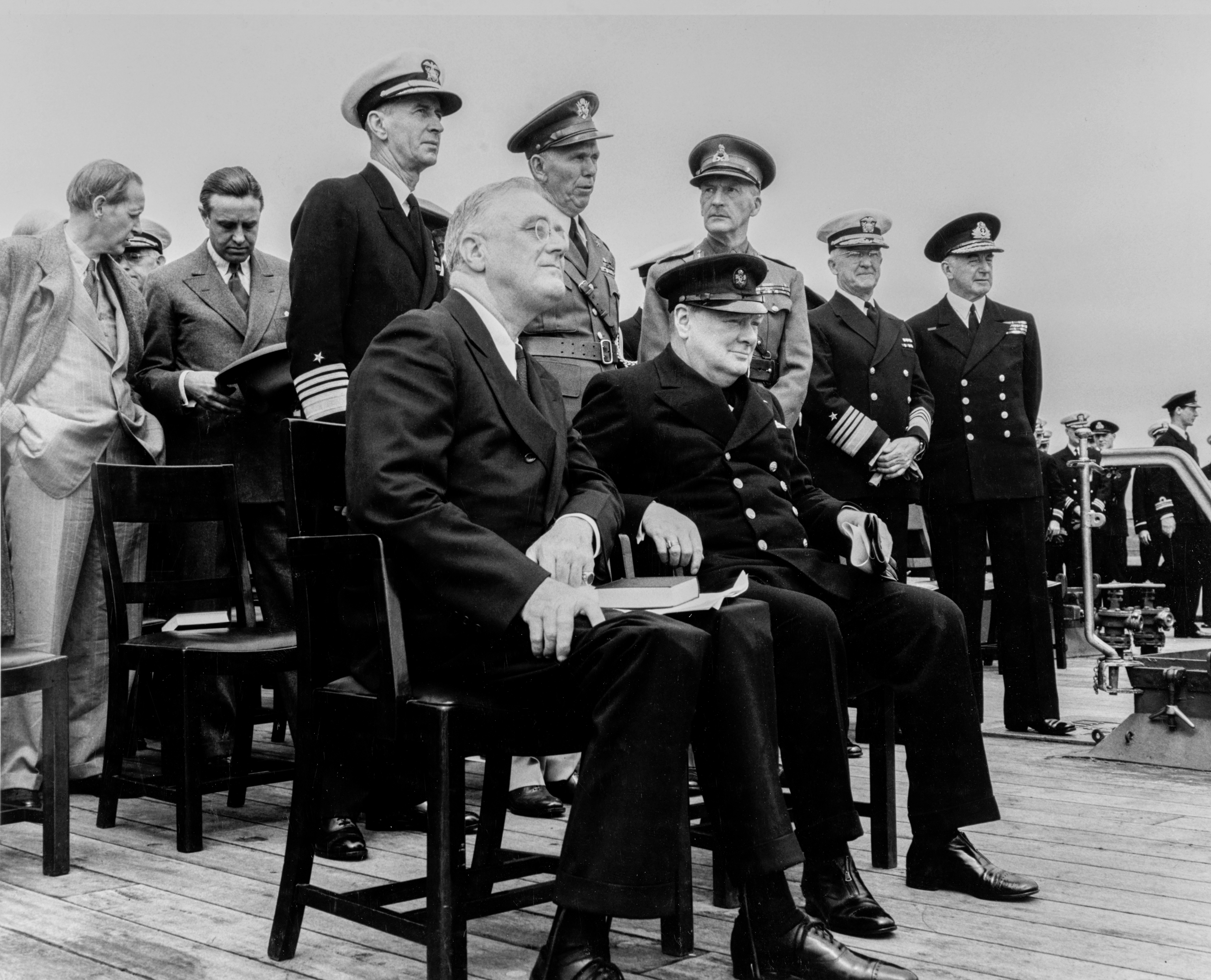
General Dill at the Atlantic Conference aboard Prince of Wales in 1941 (third from the right in second row/directly above Churchill).

Following his service on the General Staff, Dill was sent to Mandatory Palestine, during the Arab revolt, where he was appointed general officer commanding (GOC) of the British forces in Palestine on 8 September 1936, holding the post until 1937. He was knighted in the 1937 Coronation Honours with his promotion to Knight Commander of the Order of the Bath (KCB), and he was then appointed general officer commanding, Aldershot Command. The same year he was interviewed by Leslie Hore-Belisha, Secretary of State for War, for the post of Chief of the Imperial General Staff, but lost out to Lord Gort who was almost five years his junior.

== Second World War ==
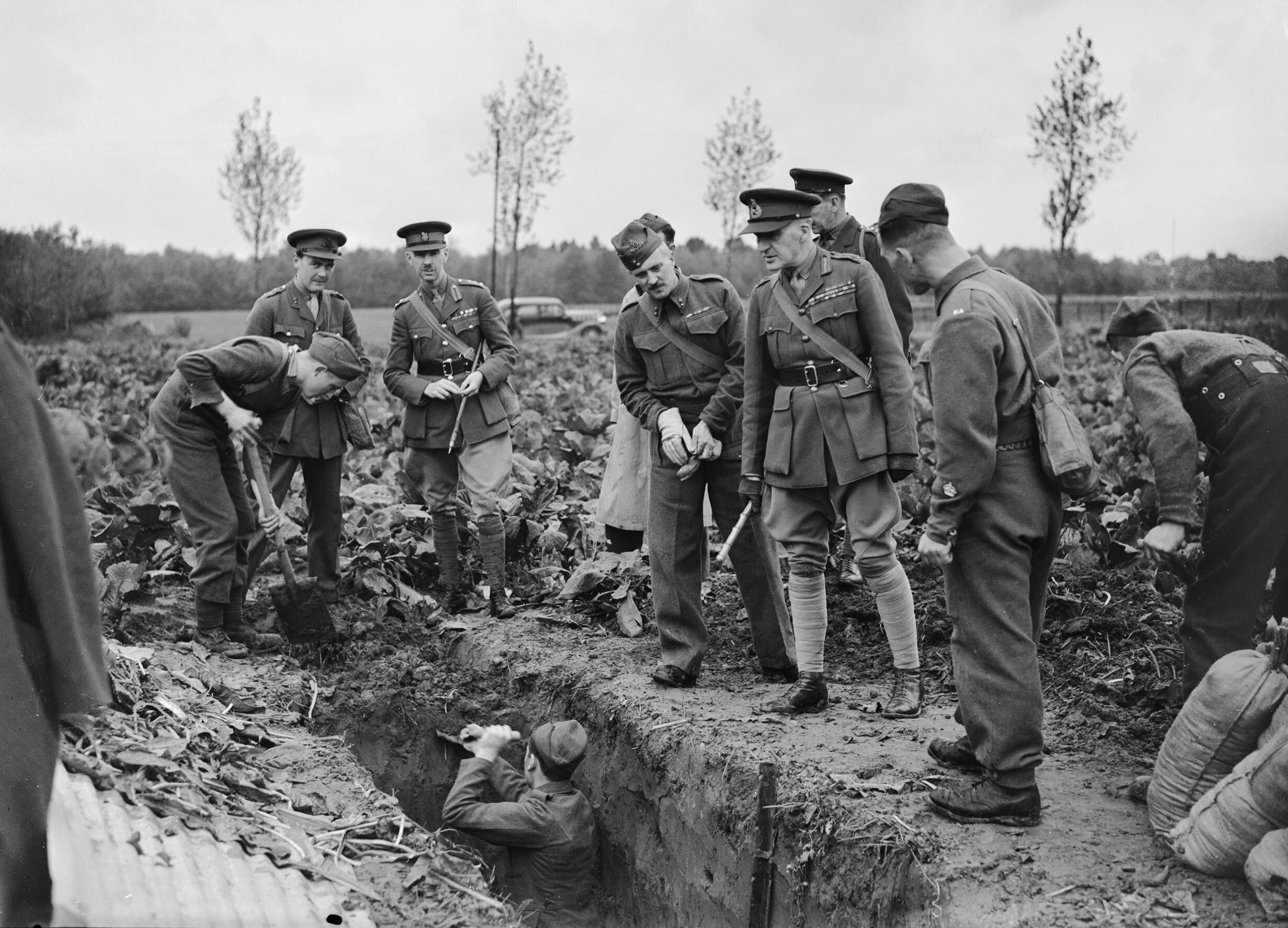
General Sir John Dill, GOC I Corps, inspecting soldiers digging trenches at Flines, France. Stood three away from Dill is his BGS, Brigadier Arthur Percival.

At the outbreak of the Second World War Dill hoped to be appointed commander-in-chief of the British Expeditionary Force, but the position again went to Gort. The resulting vacancy as Chief of the Imperial General Staff (CIGS) was filled by Sir Edmund Ironside, leaving Dill to be eventually posted as commander of I Corps in France on 3 September 1939. He was promoted to general on 1 October 1939 (with seniority backdated to 5 December 1937).

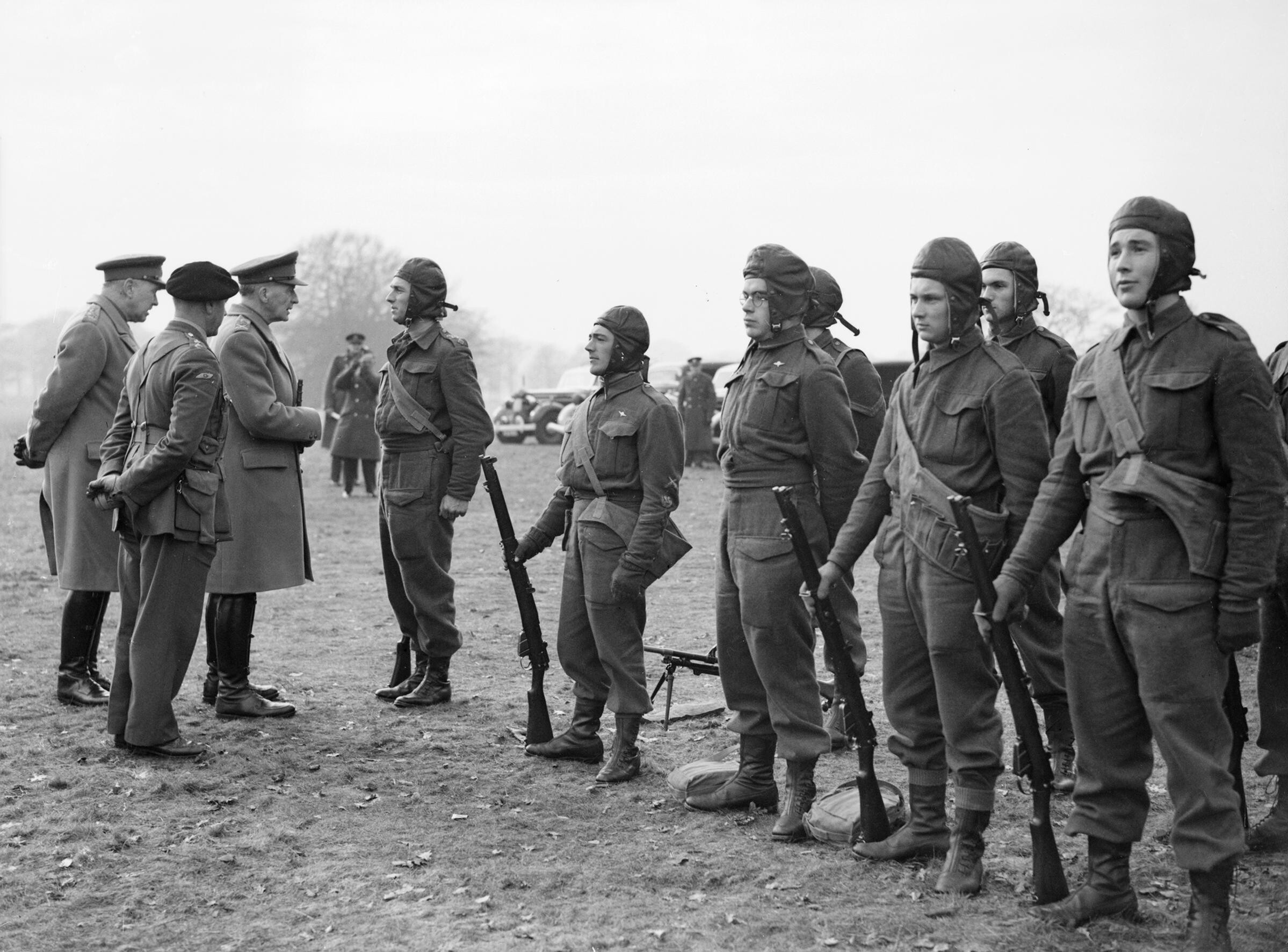
General Sir John Dill, the Chief of the Imperial General Staff (CIGS), inspecting parachute troops at the Central Landing Establishment at RAF Ringway near Manchester, December 1940.

On returning to the UK in April 1940, Dill was appointed Vice Chief of the Imperial General Staff (and a member of the Army Council), under Ironside, by the then Prime Minister Neville Chamberlain. On 27 May 1940, after Chamberlain had been replaced by Churchill, Dill replaced Ironside as CIGS.

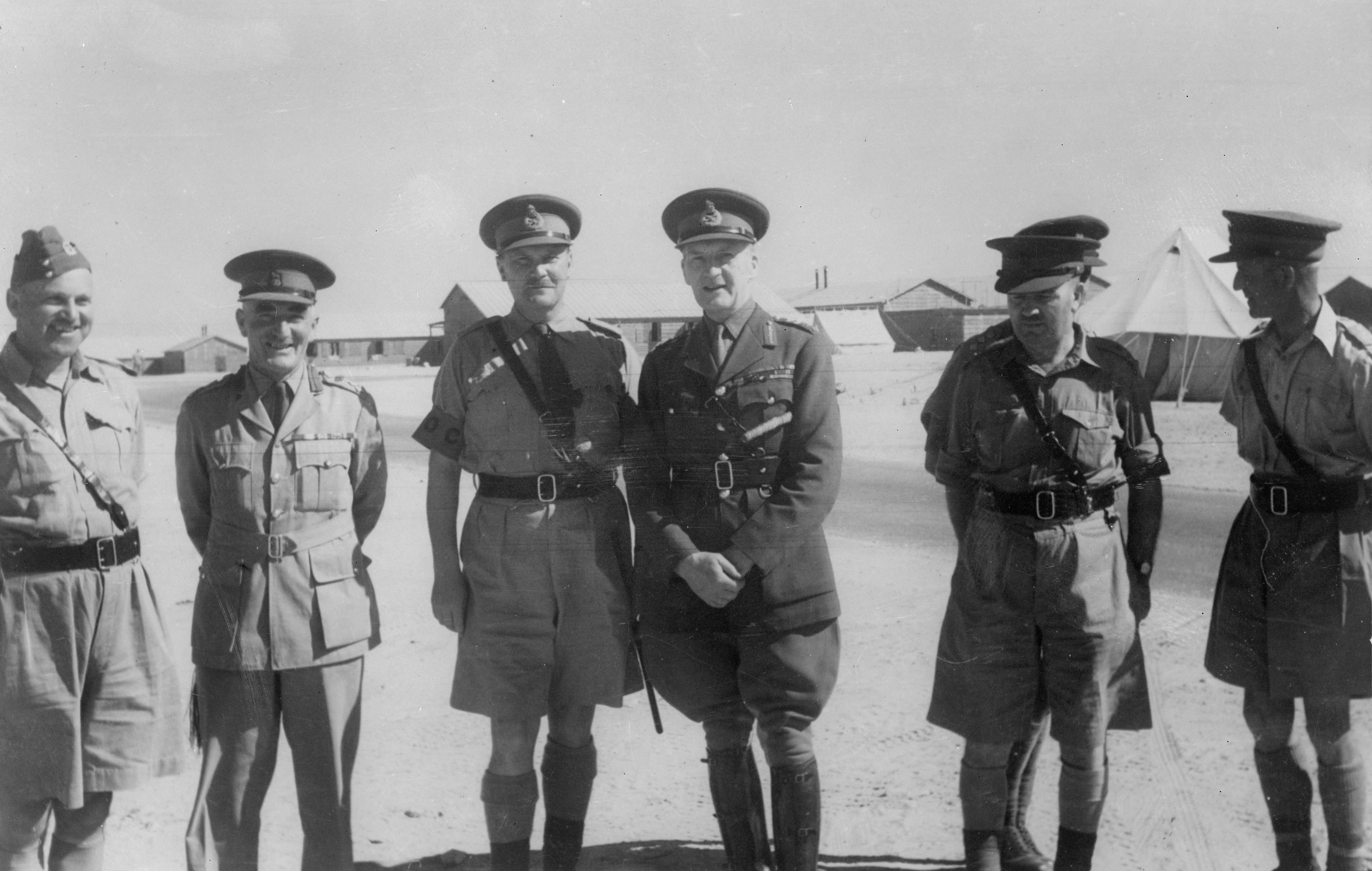
General Sir John Dill, Chief of the Imperial General Staff, visits Maadi Camp, Egypt, presumably in 1940 or 1941. From left to right: Brigadiers Reginald Miles and Edward Puttick, Major-general Bernard Freyberg and General Dill, Brigadiers James Hargest and Harold Barrowclough.

Faced with the prospect of a German invasion, Dill produced a memorandum on 15 June advocating the use of chemical warfare against an enemy landing. Although acknowledging that first use of chemical weapons would alienate the United States and invite retaliation, he concluded that "at a time when our National existence is at stake ... we should not hesitate to adopt whatever means appear to offer the best chance of success."

After criticism from the Director of Home Defence and other offices Dill withdrew the memorandum. Nevertheless, the proposal was largely endorsed by Churchill on 30 June and it was ordered that the Royal Air Force begin preparations for deploying mustard gas, although he added that actual employment would need to be ordered by the Cabinet.

Dill was promoted field marshal on 18 November 1941, but by this time it was clear how poorly he and Churchill got on. Dill gained a reputation as unimaginative and obstructionist. Keen to get him out of the way, Churchill at the end of 1941 had Dill advanced to Knight Grand Cross of the Order of the Bath (GCB) and posted him to Washington, D.C. as his personal representative where he became Chief of the British Joint Staff Mission, then Senior British Representative on the Combined Chiefs of Staff. Dill showed a great flair as a diplomatic military presence. In 1943 alone he attended the Quebec Conference, the Casablanca Conference, the Tehran Conference and meetings in India, China and Brazil. He also served on the Combined Policy Committee set up by the British and United States governments under the Quebec Agreement to oversee the construction of the atomic bomb. He was awarded the Howland Memorial Prize in 1944, in part to ensure his continued favour with Churchill.

In the United States he was immensely important in making the Chiefs of Staff committee – which included members from both countries – function, often promoting unity of action. He was particularly friendly with General George Marshall and the two exercised a great deal of influence on President Franklin Delano Roosevelt who described Dill as "the most important figure in the remarkable accord which has been developed in the combined operations of our two countries".

== Death ==
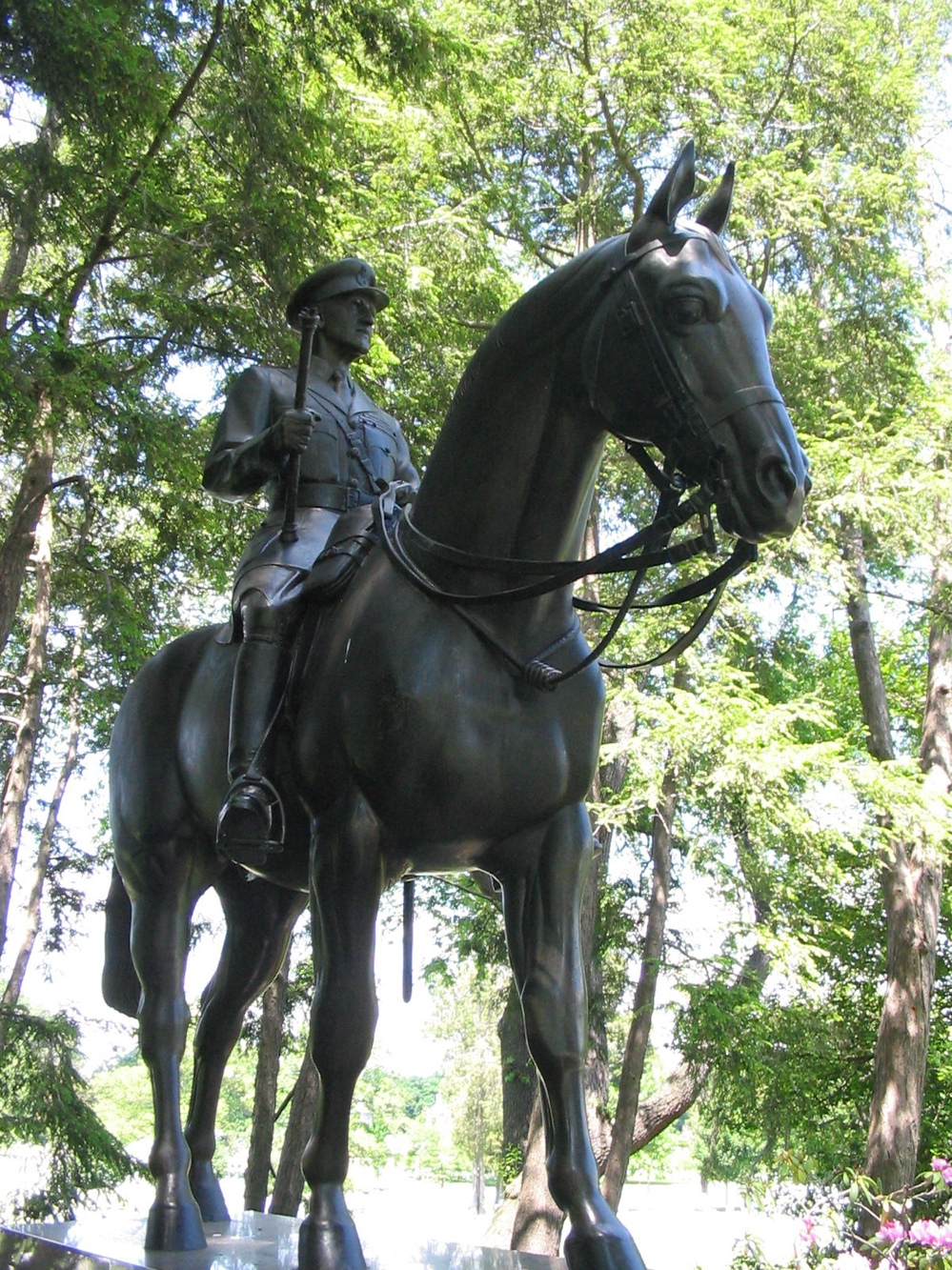
Equestrian statue of Field Marshal Sir John Dill over his grave in Arlington National Cemetery.

Dill served in Washington until his death from aplastic anaemia in November 1944. His funeral arrangements reflected the great professional and personal respect and affection that he had earned. A memorial service was held in Washington National Cathedral and the route of the cortege was lined by some thousands of troops, following which he was interred in Arlington National Cemetery, where a simple service was conducted at the graveside. A witness recorded that "I have never seen so many men so visibly shaken by sadness. [General George] Marshall's face was truly stricken ...". He was sorely missed by the American Joint Chiefs of Staff, who sent a warm message of condolence to their British colleagues:

We feel we share equally with you the loss to our combined war effort resulting from the death of Field Marshal Sir John Dill. His character and wisdom, his selfless devotion to the allied cause, made his contribution to the combined British-American war effort of outstanding importance. It is not too much to say that probably no other individual was more responsible for the achievement of complete cooperation in the work of the Combined Chiefs of Staff.

... we have looked to him with complete confidence as a leader in our combined deliberations. He has been a personal friend of all of us ...

We mourn with you the passing of a great and wise soldier, and a great gentleman. His task in this war has been well done.

Dill was posthumously awarded the American Army Distinguished Service Medal in 1944 as well as receiving an unprecedented joint resolution of the United States Congress appreciating his services. He was buried at Arlington National Cemetery, in Arlington, Virginia. The equestrian statue honoring Dill is one of only two at the cemetery, the other is that of Major-general Philip Kearny's.

== Bibliography ==
- Churchill, Winston (1985) [1949]. Their Finest Hour. The Second World War. Vol. II. Boston; Toronto: Houghton Mifflin Harcourt. ISBN 978-0-395-41056-1.
- Danchev, Alex (1986). Very Special Relationship: Field Marshal Sir John Dill and the Anglo-American Alliance, 1941–44. London: Brassey's Defence Publishers. ISBN 0-08-031197-0.
- Danchev, Alex (1991). Keegan, John (ed.). Churchill's Generals. London: Cassell Military. ISBN 0-304-36712-5.
- Doherty, Richard (2004). Ireland's Generals in the Second World War. Four Courts Press. ISBN 9781851828654.
- Harris, J.P. (2008). Douglas Haig and the First World War. Cambridge: Cambridge University Press. ISBN 978-0-521-89802-7.
- Heathcote, Tony (1999). The British Field Marshals 1736–1997. Barnsley: Pen & Sword. ISBN 0-85052-696-5.
- Mead, Richard (2007). Churchill's Lions: A Biographical Guide to the Key British Generals of World War II. Stroud: Spellmount. ISBN 978-1-86227-431-0.
- Smart, Nick (2005). Biographical Dictionary of British Generals of the Second World War. Barnesley: Pen & Sword. ISBN 1844150496.

Military offices
Preceded by Charles Gwynn	Commandant of the Staff College, Camberley; 1931–1934	Succeeded by Clement Armitage
Honorary titles
Preceded by Cecil Nicholson	Colonel of the East Lancashire Regiment; 1932–1944	Succeeded by Hugh McMullen
Military offices
Preceded by William Bartholomew	Director of Military Operations and Intelligence; 1934–1936	Succeeded by Robert Haining
New title	GOC British forces in Palestine and Trans-Jordan; 1936–1937	Succeeded by Archibald Wavell
Preceded by Sir John Gathorne-Hardy	GOC-in-C Aldershot Command; 1937–1939	Succeeded by Sir Charles Broad
New title	GOC I Corps; 1939–1940	Succeeded by Michael Barker
Preceded by Hugh Massy; As Deputy Chief of the Imperial General Staff	Vice Chief of the Imperial General Staff; April–May 1940	Succeeded by Sir Robert Haining
Preceded by Sir Edmund Ironside	Chief of the Imperial General Staff; 1940–1941	Succeeded by Sir Alan Brooke
New title	Chief of the British Joint Staff Mission to Washington; 1941–1944	Succeeded by Sir Henry Wilson
