= James Powell (cricketer, born 1899) =

English cricketer (1899–1973)

James Alfred Powell (5 May 1899 – 8 March 1973) was an English first-class cricketer active 1926–44 who played for Middlesex and Marylebone Cricket Club (MCC). He was born in Bloomsbury; died in Kensington. A member of the Lord's groundstaff he took 7/81 against Kent on his maiden first class appearance. It was reported that he "varied his slow leg breaks with marked skill, and varied his length with excellent judgement." In 32 first class games between 1926 and 1932 he took 72 wickets at an average of 27.92. His best bowling figures were 8/72.
