= Evelyn Barker =

British Army general (1894–1983)

General Sir Evelyn Barker KCB KBE DSO MC
- Born: 22 May 1894; Southsea, England
- Died: 23 November 1983 (aged 89); Mendip, England
- Military career
- Allegiance: United Kingdom
- Branch: British Army
- Service years: 1913–1950
- Rank: General
- Nickname: "Bubbles"
- Service number: 8095
- Unit: King's Royal Rifle Corps
- Commands: 2nd Battalion, King's Royal Rifle Corps (1936–1938); 10th Infantry Brigade (1938–1940); 54th (East Anglian) Infantry Division (1941–1943); 49th (West Riding) Infantry Division (1943–1944); VIII Corps (1944–1946); British Forces in Palestine and Trans-Jordan (1946–1947); Eastern Command (1947–1950)
- Conflicts: First World War; Russian Civil War; Arab revolt in Palestine; Second World War; Palestine Emergency
- Awards: Knight Commander of the Order of the Bath; Knight Commander of the Order of the British Empire; Companion of the Distinguished Service Order; Military Cross; Mentioned in despatches (5); Commander of the Legion of Honour (France); Silver Medal of Military Valor (Italy)

General Sir Evelyn Hugh Barker, KCB, KBE, DSO, MC (22 May 1894 – 23 November 1983) was a British Army officer who saw service in both the First World War and the Second World War. During the latter, he commanded the 10th Brigade during the Battle of France in 1940, the 49th (West Riding) Infantry Division and the VIII Corps in the Western Europe Campaign from 1944 to 1945.

After the war, Barker was the general officer commanding (GOC) of the British Forces in Palestine and Trans-Jordan from 1946 to 1947, during the Palestine Emergency. He is remembered for surviving assassination attempts during the insurgency, and his controversial antisemitic order in the wake of the King David Hotel bombing in July 1946 in which he declared, "[We] will be punishing the Jews in a way the race dislikes as much as any, by striking at their pockets and showing our contempt of them."

== Early life ==
Born in Southsea, Hampshire, England, on 22 May 1894, Evelyn Hugh Barker was the son of Major General Sir George Barker, a British Army officer of the Royal Engineers, and the Hon. Clemency Hubbard, daughter of John Hubbard, 1st Baron Addington, as the youngest of two children and the only son. He was educated at Wellington College, Berkshire, later entering the Royal Military College, Sandhurst, where, on 5 February 1913, he passed out and was commissioned into the King's Royal Rifle Corps (KRRC) of the British Army. He was posted to the 4th Battalion, KRRC, which was then serving in Gharial, British India.

== First World War ==
Barker, who had by now gained the nickname "Bubbles", was still in India with his battalion when the First World War began in August 1914. In November, the battalion was dispatched back to the United Kingdom, and joined the 27th Division. On 27 November, Barker was promoted to the temporary rank of lieutenant. The following month, the 27th Division was deployed to the Western Front in France. Barker was wounded in March 1915, during the actions of St Eloi Craters. In November, after having recovered from his injury, he was sent to the Salonica front along with his battalion, where he would remain for the remainder of the war. On 10 April 1916, Barker was promoted to captain and became the battalion's adjutant. He remained in this role until August 1917, when he became a General Staff Officer Grade 3 (GSO3) on the headquarters of the 22nd Division. He relinquished this appointment on 11 January 1918, upon becoming a brigade major with the 67th Brigade. By the end of the war, he had been wounded twice, awarded the Military Cross and the Italian Silver Medal of Military Valor, and twice been mentioned in despatches. On 3 June 1919, he was appointed a Companion of the Distinguished Service Order.

In 1919, Barker took part in the British military expedition in the Russian Civil War.

== Interwar period ==
Barker remained in the army during the interwar period and was promoted to captain on 19 August 1920. He later returned to the United Kingdom and served as a GSO3 at the War Office and later at Southern Command. In 1923, he married Violet Eleanor. They had one son, George Worsley Barker. Barker then served on regimental duties for several years before he attended the Staff College, Camberley, from 1927 to 1928. After graduation, he was assigned back to the KRRC. On 1 July 1929, he was promoted to brevet major. On 4 December 1929, he returned to the War Office as a GSO3.

On 1 July 1934, Barker was made a brevet lieutenant-colonel and assigned to the 8th Infantry Brigade, part of the 3rd Infantry Division. In June 1936, Barker became commanding officer of the 2nd Battalion, KRRC. The battalion was dispatched to Palestine, on internal security duties, during the 1936–39 Arab revolt in Palestine. In 1937, the battalion was converted into a motorised infantry formation and returned to the United Kingdom to become part of the Mobile Division (later the 1st Armoured Division).

In late July 1938, Barker relinquished his battalion command. On 1 August, he was promoted to brevet colonel and was given the temporary rank of brigadier for his new command, the 10th Infantry Brigade (part of the 4th Infantry Division). Barker, who was 44, had been selected over those who had seniority and indicated that Barker's superiors regarded him highly. That move caused some resentment with other officers who had been passed over.

== Second World War ==
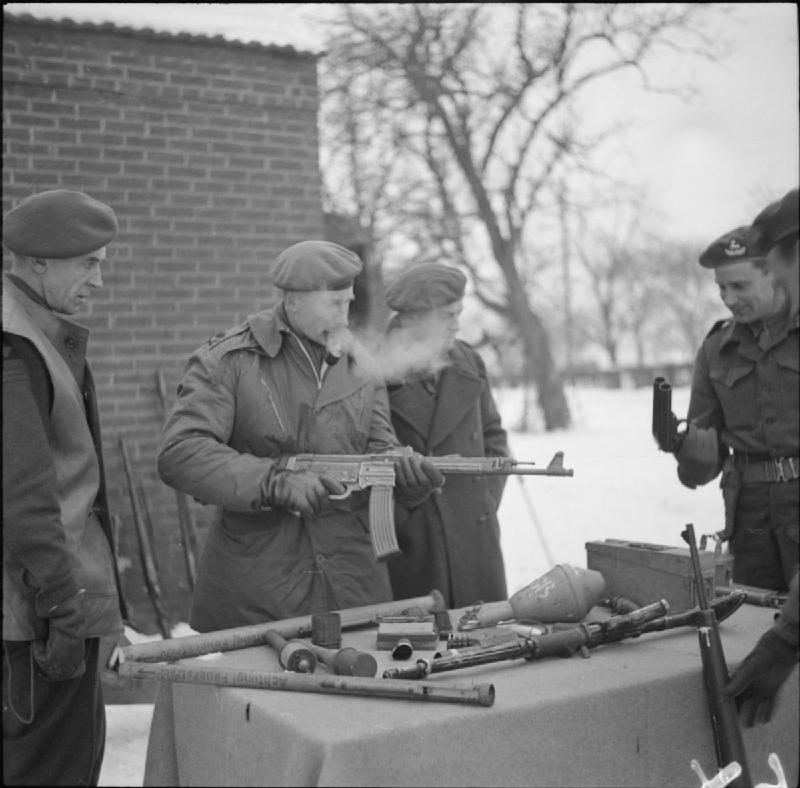
Barker inspecting an StG 44 and other captured German weapons, 26 January 1945

=== France and Belgium ===
In October 1939, one month after the outbreak of the Second World War, Barker took his brigade to France as part of the British Expeditionary Force (BEF). The 10th Brigade formed part of the 4th Division. After many months of relative inactivity, called the Phoney War, Germany on 10 May launched its assault on the Western Front. Barker was on leave in England and immediately returned to France. The division advanced to Brussels but, after a strategic reverse in the campaign, was forced to retreat soon afterwards. On 27 May, Barker's brigade was briefly transferred to the 5th Division and fought to hold the Ypres-Comines canal against an assault by three German divisions. The day after, Barker and his brigade were ordered to retreat to Dunkirk. His brigade sustained heavy losses during the campaign, and was evacuated to England on 31 May. The historian Peter Young, then a platoon commander in Barker's brigade, was impressed by Barker during this period and wrote he was "the coolest man you could wish to see under fire. He seemed to like it; indeed I feel sure that he did. He liked to observe his officers and men in times of stress, because it helped to weigh them up. After so many years I am not ashamed to confess that I always felt braver when he was present".

=== Home front ===
In England, Barker retained command of the 10th Infantry Brigade until 5 October 1940. He then spent the next two months as member of a Transportation Committee, which saw him temporarily reduced to the rank of colonel. He was mentioned in despatches on 26 July, and made a Commander of the Order of the British Empire on 20 August for his services in France and Belgium.

On 11 February 1941, Barker was promoted to the acting rank of major general and made general officer commanding (GOC) 54th (East Anglian) Infantry Division. During his tenure, Barker trained the division to prepare to repel a potential German invasion. On 30 April 1943, Barker became GOC of the 49th (West Riding) Infantry Division.

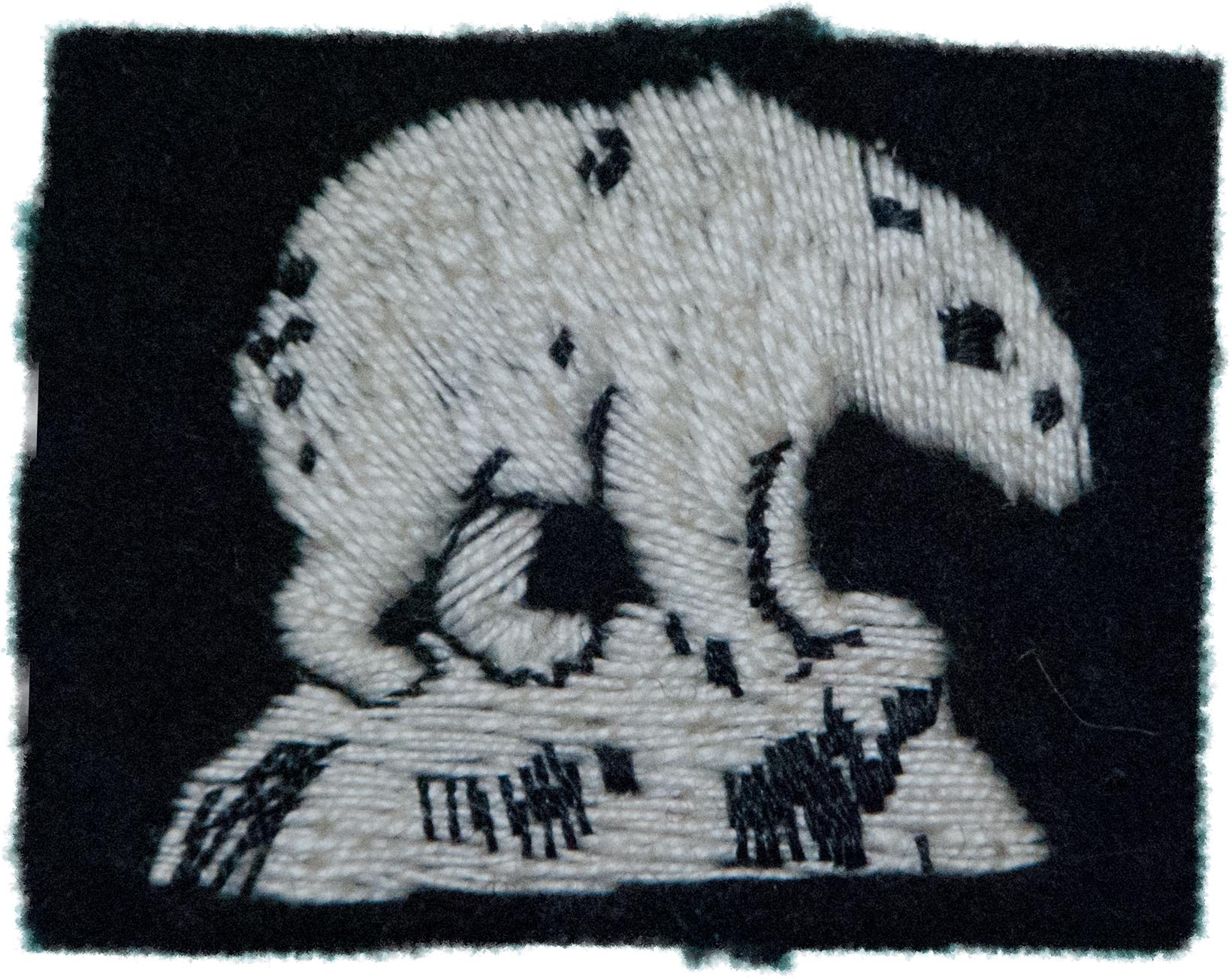
"Timid-looking" polar bear

"Aggressive" polar bear

The 49th Division had previously garrisoned Iceland and adopted a polar bear for its insignia. Barker believed the original design looked too timid and had the polar bear redesigned into a more aggressive-looking animal. When Barker became GOC, the division had been selected to join the British Second Army to take part in the Allies' invasion of Normandy. It was initially assigned to be an assault division in the opening of the invasion and as a result Barker had his men undertake amphibious warfare training. On 1 January 1944, Barker was made a Companion of the Order of the Bath. In early 1944, the invasion plan was updated and the 49th Division was assigned to a follow-up role rather than being an assault division.

=== Northwestern Europe ===
The 49th Division landed in Normandy, as part of Operation Overlord, on 12 June 1944. Barker was confident about the ability of his troops and wrote in his diary on 2 June "I have a first class party to go with − I am satisfied that my chaps are in as good, if not better shape, than any others ... It will be a grim business but what fun when we see the Boche start to crack. After all these years of waiting I wouldn't miss this for anything". The division's first contact with German forces came near Tilly-sur-Seulles on 16 June. Barker's division led Operation Martlet, an attack to support a larger offensive codenamed Operation Epsom. The division eventually secured its objective and fended off repeated German counterattacks over four days and inflicted heavy tank losses. Barker's direction of the division during the action impressed his superiors.

The division played a minor role in the rest of the campaign and helped capture Le Havre during Operation Astonia. By the month's end, the division was at Willemstad. On 21 September, the division moved into Belgium and liberated Turnhout. Barker's division undertook defensive duties and captured the Dutch town of Roosendaal on 30 October after ten days of hard fighting.

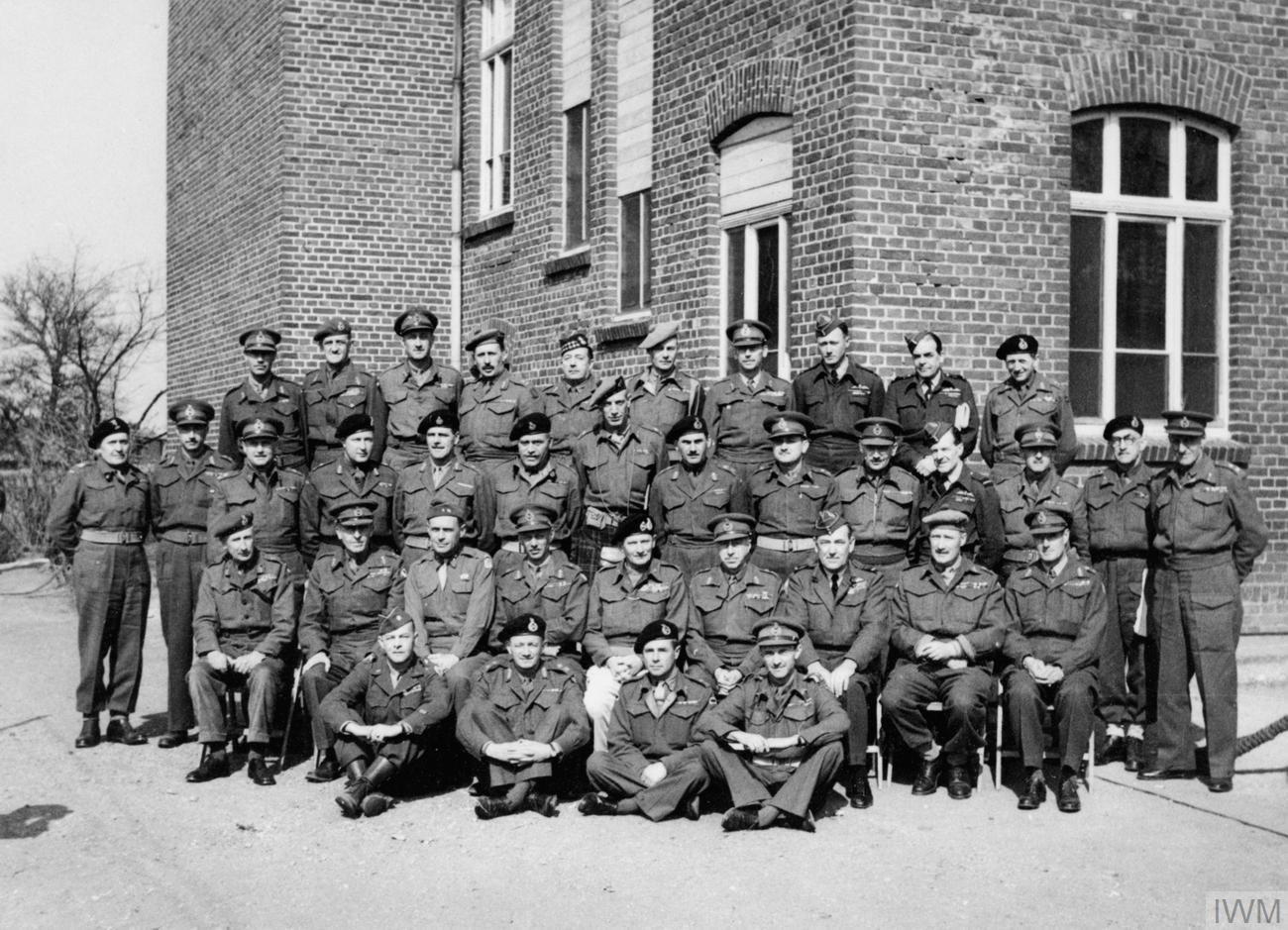
Field Marshal Bernard Montgomery with his staff, and corps and divisional commanders in Walbeck, Germany, 22 March 1945. Barker is on the far left.

In November, Barker's division was assigned to clear the west bank of the River Maas on the Dutch-German frontier. On 28 November, Barker met Montgomery and Lieutenant General Miles Dempsey, GOC Second Army. Both had been impressed with Barker's handling of the 49th Division and assigned him to command of the VIII Corps. As part of taking his new command, Barker was promoted to the acting rank of lieutenant general on 2 December. His first action as corps GOC was to oversee the corps' role in the final stages of Operation Nutcracker.

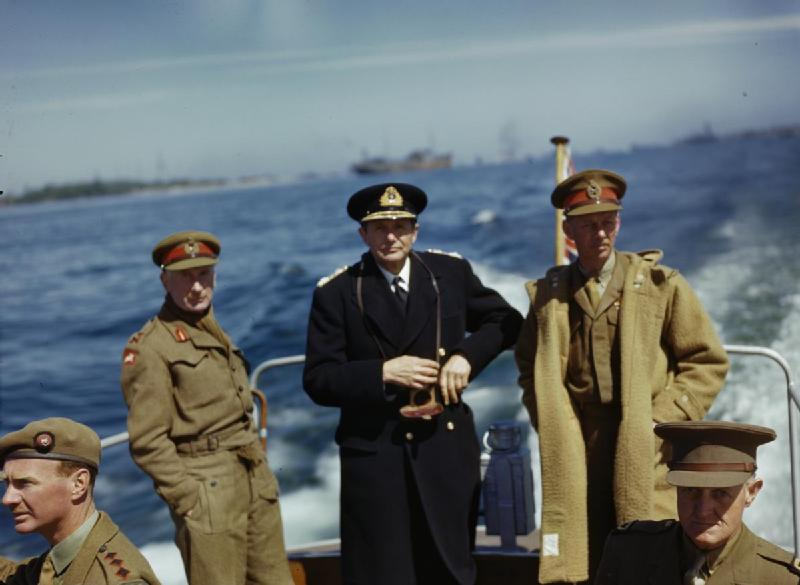
From left to right: Barker, Rear Admiral H. T. Baillie-Grohman, Miles Dempsey. The trio tour Kiel Harbour, Germany, 19 May 1945.

VIII Corps saw further action during the final push into Germany between March and May 1945. Barker's corps captured Osnabrück, Minden, Celle, and Lüneburg. It also liberated the survivors of the Bergen-Belsen concentration camp. After the German capitulation and the end of World War II in Europe, Montgomery appointed Barker to head the Schleswig-Holstein Corps District of the British occupation zone. Barker was knighted as a Knight Commander of the Order of the British Empire on 5 July 1945. During the entire campaign, Barker was twice mentioned in despatches.

== Postwar and British Mandate ==
On 31 December 1945, Barker was made an Honorary Colonel of the Duke of York's Own Loyal Suffolk Hussars. He held this position until 1 September 1950. He was also made colonel commandant of the KRRC from 11 February 1946 to 10 February 1956. On 5 May 1946, his rank of lieutenant general was made permanent.

Barker was dispatched to Palestine and appointed GOC of the British Forces in Palestine and Trans-Jordan. During his term of command, he lived in Rehavia in the Schocken Villa, one of the most upscale residences in Jerusalem.

=== Affair with Katie Antonius ===
Soon after arriving in Palestine, Barker became a frequenter of the Jerusalem high society gatherings in the mansion of Katie Antonius, who was the widow of George Antonius. The evening dances in the Karm al Mufti mansion, the Shepherd Hotel, were attended by diplomats, artists and British officers. Barker engaged in an affair with Katie. Barker's letters to his mistress contained passages that were overtly anti-Semitic. For example, he described his feelings towards the Jews in Palestine in an April 1947 letter: "Yes I loathe the lot – whether they be Zionists or not. Why should we be afraid of saying we hate them? Its time this damned race knew what we think of them – loathsome people."

=== Advocate of death penalty ===
Barker saw capital punishment as an effective deterrent and argued for a wide application of the death penalty to Zionist guerillas. That it had never been applied in the preceding years he considered among the major causes of the failure to suppress the insurgency. Barker said: "I am in favour of the death penalty for murder, political or otherwise. The one strict law we had was against carrying arms. And it's no good having a law like that if you don't enforce it. So if anyone was caught carrying arms, he was up before a court martial, he could state his case, but if he was found guilty that was it. And, subject to Alan Cunningham's [the High Commissioner of Palestine] final say, I would confirm the death sentence". Barker was strongly supported by Montgomery. On 18 June 1946, the Irgun, a group of Zionist militants, abducted five British officers, to be held as hostages for recently-condemned militants. Montgomery, now Chief of the Imperial Staff, travelled to Palestine and met with Barker. Montgomery recalled: "I said that General Barker, as the confirming authority for death sentences on Jews convicted by military tribunals, must not be deterred from his duty by threats of the murder of five British officers who had been kidnapped since my visit a few days earlier. This did a good deal to strengthen his resolve. Barker was suffering from a lack of support by the Government authorities; I promised him my full support in his difficult task".

=== Operation Agatha ===
In June 1946, Barker planned a large-scale police operation throughout the Yishuv. Having the long-awaited order to arrest the leaders of the Jewish Agency, which was now believed to be complicit in terrorism, Barker organised Operation Agatha. The operation began on 29 June, with tens of thousands of soldiers and policemen employed in a cordon-and-search action in almost every Jewish settlement. Over 2,700 Jews were detained, including leaders of the Jewish Agency. Dozens of weapon caches were found, including one in the Great Synagogue of Tel Aviv.

=== Ban on social interaction with Jews ===
On 22 July 1946, the King David Hotel in Jerusalem was bombed. The hotel housed Barker's office and the British headquarters for the Palestinian mandate. Barker was present but was not among the injured. Afterwards, Barker drafted an order that placed "out of bounds to all ranks all Jewish establishments, restaurants, shop, and private dwellings". The order forbade British soldiers in Palestine from having "social intercourse with any Jew" and noted, "I appreciate that these measures will inflict some hardship on the troops, yet I am certain that if my reasons are fully explained to them they will understand their propriety and will be punishing the Jews in a way the race dislikes as much as any, by striking at their pockets and showing our contempt of them." Barker later regretted issuing the order: "My office was in the middle of the building, overlooking the Old City. When I heard the explosion, I walked across the landing and I couldn't see anything, only dust. I was so angry when I found out what had happened that I went straight to my office and wrote an order to the troops, putting all Jewish establishments out of bounds. It was a rotten letter, written on the spur of the moment. I ought to have restrained myself for an hour or two before putting pen to paper."

=== Operation Shark ===
With information that the Irgun ring, responsible for the King David Hotel bombing, was hiding in Tel Aviv, Barker organised a massive police operation in the city. His instructions were short: "I want you to search Tel Aviv, every single room and attic and cellar in Tel Aviv. Is that quite clear?" The police action in Tel Aviv, codenamed Operation Shark, began on 30 July and achieved several successes. However, the most important figure of the Zionist underground, Menachem Begin, slipped through British hands. Barker later recalled: "We should have caught him, but the men did not search his house properly. This is one of the problems of search operations. You have to rely on very junior people, and, if they make a mistake, the whole operation can be damaged."

On 24 January 1947, Barker confirmed the death sentence of the Irgun fighter, Dov Gruner. Barker later said in an interview:

This was a cut-and-dried case. Gruner had been caught red-handed, armed and shooting up British troops. His political views were nothing to do with the matter. It's nonsense to say that he was a prisoner of war. There was no war. Even if there had been, the Irgun were not obeying the rules of war. He was a criminal, a murderer. So I took it up to Alan Cunningham and I said, "This is an absolutely definite case of carrying arms and I propose to sign the death warrant. Do you agree? He said he did. It wasn't political. It wasn't referred to London. It was a decision taken by me on the spot.

=== Assassination attempts ===
Barker was the target of several assassination efforts, which included explosive devices placed around his residence. In 1977, after it was revealed that General Ezer Weizman, a former commander of the Israeli Air Force and future President of Israel, was involved in one of these attempts, Barker commented: "I expect he's glad that he failed in his mission. What good would it have done to kill me? It wouldn't have helped the Jewish cause or the Irgun or anyone else. At least General Weizman has been able to go through the last thirty years without a murder on his conscience."

== Last years of military service and retirement ==
Barker left Palestine in February 1947, and returned to the United Kingdom. Despite controversy surrounding his command in Palestine, Barker was largely unknown to the public. On 15 November 1948, he was promoted to a full general, with seniority backdated to 3 October 1946. On 2 January 1950, he was appointed a Knight Commander of the Order of the Bath. From 6 July 1949 to 18 March 1950, he was aide-de-camp general to King George VI. Barker retired from military service on 18 March 1950.

On 1 January 1951, Barker was made the Honorary Colonel of the 286th (Hertfordshire and Bedfordshire Yeomanry) Regiment, Royal Artillery, and held that post until 31 December 1962. He was Deputy Lieutenant for the county of Bedfordshire from 12 July 1952 until 20 April 1967.

== Bibliography ==
- Bethell, Nicholas (1979). The Palestine Triangle: the Struggle for the Holy Land, 1935–48. New York: Putnam. ISBN 978-0-399-12398-6.
- Defries, Harry (2001). Conservative Party attitudes to Jews, 1900–1950. London: Frank Cass. ISBN 0-7146-5221-0.
- Delaforce, Patrick (1995). The Polar Bears: Monty's Left Flank: From Normandy to the Relief of Holland with the 49th Division. Stroud: Chancellor Press. ISBN 9780753702659.
- Horrocks, Sir Brian (1960). A Full Life. Barnsley: Leo Cooper. ISBN 0-85052-144-0.
- Jackson, G. S.; Staff, 8 Corps (2006) [1945]. 8 Corps: Normandy to the Baltic. MLRS Books. ISBN 978-1-905696-25-3.
- Mead, Richard (2007). Churchill's Lions: a biographical guide to the key British generals of World War II. Stroud (UK): Spellmount. ISBN 978-1-86227-431-0.
- Commando to Captain-General: The Life of Brigadier Peter Young, Alison Michelli
- Montgomery, Bernard (1982) [1958]. The memoirs of Field-Marshal the Viscount Montgomery of Alamein, K.G. New York: Da Capo Press. ISBN 978-0-306-80173-0.
- Smart, Nick (2005). Biographical Dictionary of British Generals of the Second World War. Barnesley: Pen & Sword. ISBN 1844150496.
- Segev, Tom (2000). One Palestine, Complete: Jews and Arabs Under the British Mandate. Watzman, Haim (translator from Hebrew). London: Little, Brown. ISBN 0-316-64859-0.

Military offices
| Preceded by John Priestman | GOC 54th (East Anglian) Infantry Division; 1941–1943 | Succeeded by Charles Wainwright |
| Preceded by Henry Curtis | GOC 49th (West Riding) Infantry Division; 1943–1944 | Succeeded by Gordon MacMillan |
| Preceded by Sir Richard O'Connor | GOC VIII Corps; 1944–1946 | Post disbanded |
Honorary titles
| Preceded by Sir John Davidson | Colonel Commandant of the 2nd Battalion, King's Royal Rifle Corps; 1946–1956 | Succeeded by Sir George Erskine |
Military offices
| Preceded by John D'Arcy | GOC British Forces in Palestine and Trans-Jordan; 1946–1947 | Succeeded by Sir Gordon MacMillan |
| Preceded by Sir Oliver Leese | GOC-in-C Eastern Command; 1947–1950 | Succeeded by Sir Gerald Templer |
