= Hugh Massy (British Army officer) =

Lieutenant-General Hugh Massy CB DSO MC
- Born: 5 January 1884; Pembrokeshire, Wales
- Died: 21 May 1965 (aged 81)
- Military career
- Allegiance: United Kingdom
- Branch: British Army
- Service years: 1902–1943
- Rank: Lieutenant-General
- Service number: 6163
- Unit: Royal Artillery
- Commands: XI Corps (1940–41); Allied Forces Central Norway (1940); V Corps (1940)
- Conflicts: First World War; Second World War
- Awards: Companion of the Order of the Bath; Distinguished Service Order; Military Cross; Mentioned in Despatches (2)

Lieutenant-General Hugh Royds Stokes Massy, CB, DSO, MC (5 January 1884 – 21 May 1965) was a British Army officer who served during the First and Second World Wars.

== Military career ==
Educated at Bradfield College and the Royal Military Academy, Woolwich, Massy was commissioned into the Royal Regiment of Artillery as a second lieutenant on 24 December 1902. He served with the West African Frontier Force from 1907 and then became adjutant for 4th East Lancashire Brigade in 1913.

Massy served in the First World War, initially as a staff officer in the Mediterranean Expeditionary Force and then as a Brigade Major in France from 15 June 1917.

After the war he attended the Staff College, Camberley, in 1919 and became a brigade major with Irish Command in 1920 and then went to India, initially as a staff officer, and then as an instructor at the Staff College, Quetta. After attending the Imperial Defence College in 1930, he was an instructor at the Senior Officers' School, Belgaum, from 1932 and then, after being promoted to colonel on 9 August 1933, with seniority backdated to 27 March 1932, became a brigadier with Southern Command in 1934. He was appointed Director of Military Training at the War Office in 1938.

Massy served in the Second World War, initially as Deputy Chief of Imperial General Staff and then as Commander-in-Chief of the North West Expeditionary Force to Central Norway in 1940; he went on to command XI Corps in East Anglia from July 1940 to November 1941. He retired in 1943.

He was Colonel Commandant of the Royal Artillery from 1945 to 1951, and High Sheriff of Pembrokeshire in 1946.

== Family ==
In 1912 Massy married Maud Ina Nest Roch. They had one son and one daughter.

== Bibliography ==
- Smart, Nick (2005). Biographical Dictionary of British Generals of the Second World War. Barnesley: Pen & Sword. ISBN 1844150496.

Military offices
Preceded by Sir Ronald Adam	Deputy Chief of the Imperial General Staff; 1939–1940	Succeeded by Sir John Dill; As Vice Chief of the Imperial General Staff
New command	GOC, XI Corps; 1940–1941	Succeeded by Noel Irwin
