= Operation Shark =

1946 British counter-terrorism operation in Mandatory Palestine

- Part of Jewish insurgency in Mandatory Palestine
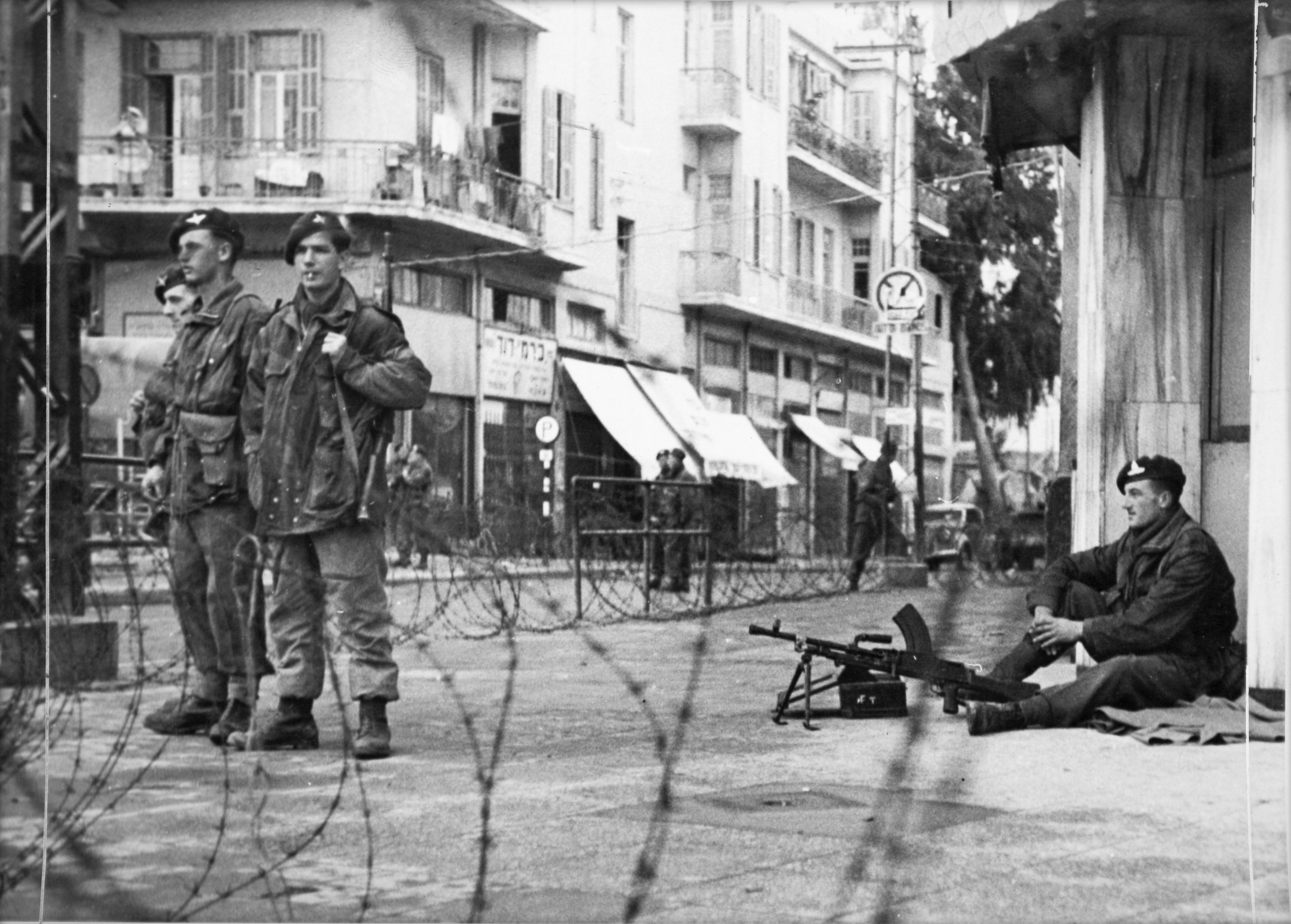
- British paratroopers occupying a Tel Aviv intersection during Operation Shark
- Operational scope: Strategic
- Type: Counter-insurgency
- Planned by: Mandatory Palestine
- Objective: Disarm and disrupt Jewish insurgent groups
- Date: 30 July 1946 – 2 August 1946
- Outcome: Success in disrupting insurgent activity; Bolstered public support for an end to the Mandate of Palestine

Operation Shark was a counter-terrorism operation conducted by the British Army and Palestine Police Force in Tel Aviv, then part of Mandatory Palestine, in response to the King David Hotel bombing. Conducted through a series of house to house searches, the operation was intended to deprive the Irgun of manpower, hideouts, and weaponry.

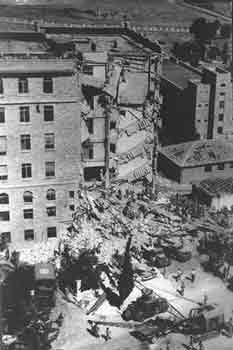
The 22 July bombing of the King David Hotel was the direct cause of Operation Shark.

== Background ==
By 1946 the situation in Palestine had grown increasingly unstable. In response to an increase in insurgent activity, the Mandatory Palestine garrison and police force launched Operation Agatha on 29 June 1946. Checkpoints were set up, trains were flagged down, and workers were escorted home. Special licenses were issued to operators of emergency vehicles. Curfews were imposed and people found in violation of them were detained, with some being imprisoned. The operation uncovered large stockpiles of illicit weapons. In one instance, the entire male population of the town of Yagur was arrested after 300 rifles and 400,000 bullets were discovered in the kibbutz. While the operation was seen as a success by the Mandate, it created a great deal of public unrest and was labeled "Black Saturday" by the general population.

In response to Operation Agatha, the Irgun planted a bomb in the basement of the King David Hotel in Jerusalem, where the Mandate government ran an office. The bomb detonated on 22 July 1946, heavily damaging the building and killing 91 people. The attack triggered worldwide outrage and spurred calls for a crackdown in Palestine.

In the immediate aftermath of the attack, a dawn to dusk curfew was imposed on the Jewish neighborhoods of Jerusalem, which was to last 16 days until 7 August. Chief of the Imperial General Staff Bernard Montgomery, with the support of Foreign Secretary Ernest Bevin, pressed for widespread arms searches of Jewish settlements to disarm the Yishuv. On 23 July, the British cabinet met to discuss a response to the bombing. Prime Minister Clement Attlee argued against an arms search operation on the grounds that it would further alienate the Yishuv, reverse the effects of Operation Agatha in strengthening moderate leaders within the Yishuv, and complicate negotiations that Britain was undertaking with the United States regarding Palestine's future. The negotiations in question resulted in the publication of the Morrison–Grady Plan on 31 July, which proposed the division of Palestine into autonomous Jewish and Arab provinces under British oversight. The cabinet decided to publish a white paper titled Statement of Information Relating to Acts of Violence, presenting evidence gathered by British intelligence that the Haganah had cooperated with the Irgun and Lehi in the insurgency and that the Jewish Agency's political leadership was involved.

On 25 July, the cabinet resumed discussions over the bombing. High Commissioner Alan Cunningham, who was doubtful that the proposed arms search operation would succeed, advocated a plan proposed by Lieutenant General Sir Evelyn Barker, the General Officer Commanding of British Forces in Palestine and Transjordan, for a cordon and search operation of Tel Aviv, as British military intelligence had incorrectly concluded that most if not all of the participants in the King David Hotel attack had come to Jerusalem from there, when in fact the Irgun fighters responsible were based in Jerusalem. Cunningham also suggested that a collective fine of £500,000 be imposed on the Yishuv and that legal Jewish immigration to Palestine be suspended. The cabinet decided against the arms search operation, collective fine, and suspension of Jewish immigration for fear of provoking a wider conflagration and undermining negotiations over the Morrison–Grady Plan, although the ministers agreed that the Yishuv would eventually have to be disarmed, but approved the search of Tel Aviv.

== Operation Shark ==
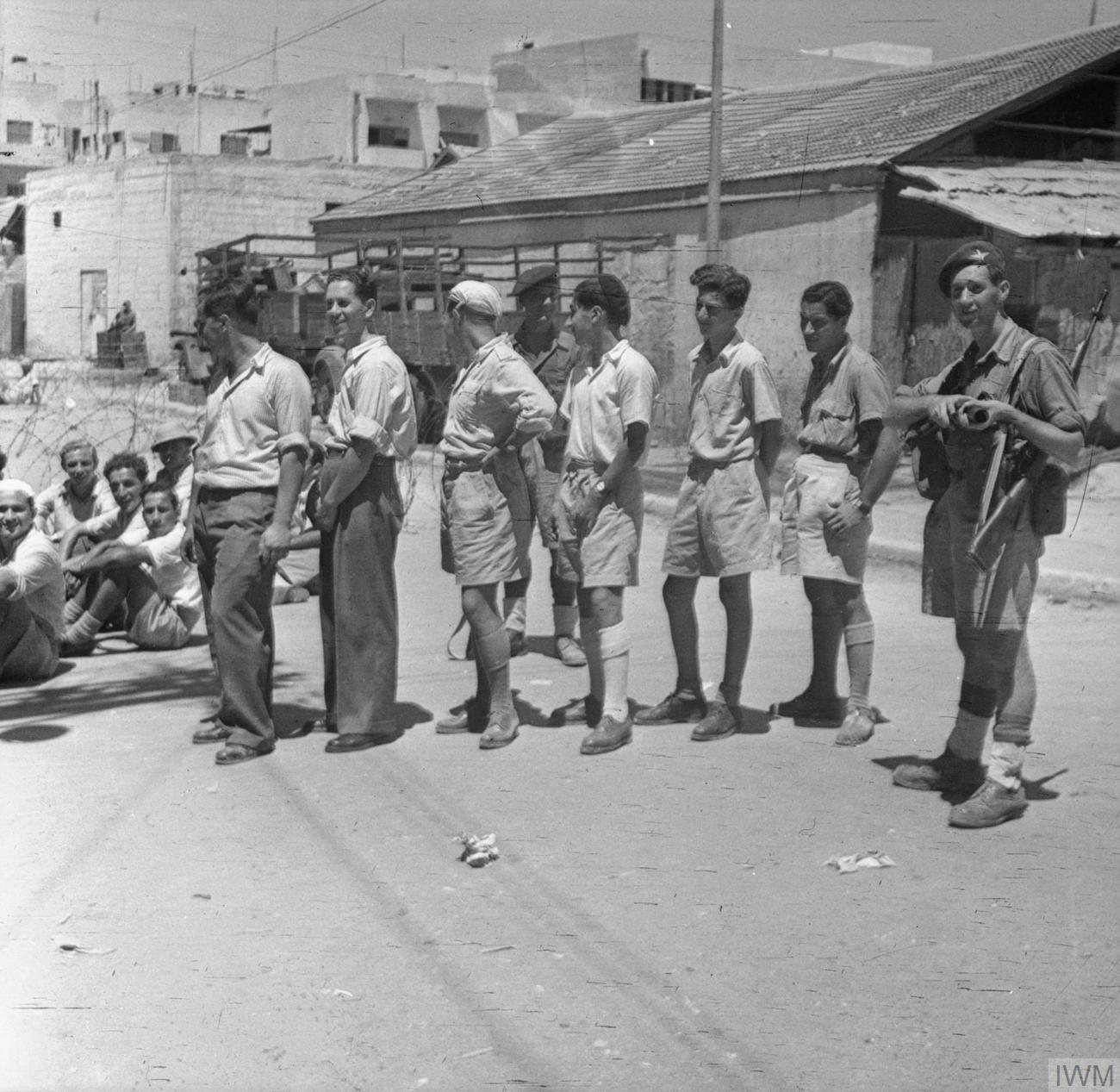
Jewish civilians guarded by a soldier of the Parachute Regiment waiting to be interrogated

Operation Shark began on the early morning of 30 July 1946, and involved some 15,000 British soldiers as well as Palestine Police Force officers. The entirety of Tel Aviv and sections of Jaffa were cordoned off and searched. An outer cordon was put in place before the troops moved up and inner cordons and curfews were established. The civilian population was kept under curfew for all but two hours of the day, when people were allowed to leave their homes to obtain food and medicine. A warning was issued that curfew violators were liable to be shot on sight. Plans were made for short periods of food distribution and essential services such as hospitals and utilities were continued under military guard. The process was for all occupants to be assembled in open areas and to have IDs checked. The house would then be searched and all except the elderly, infirm and children screened; suspects and persons of interest were then taken to government buildings for screening by CID officers. About 102,000 people were screened, including every male from ages 15 to 50 and every female from ages 15 to 30 except for those pregnant or with small children. Overall, between 500–787 people were arrested in connection with insurgent activities and five arms caches were discovered, including one in the city's Great Synagogue.

=== Effectiveness ===
A wide range of opinions exist as to the effectiveness of Operation Shark. In his memoirs, Irgun leader Menachem Begin, who escaped the cordon by hiding in a secret compartment of his house, declared that the operation had been a costly failure that had bolstered popular support for the insurgency. General Barker stated that,

the operation has temporarily cost us what friends amongst the Jews we still had.

— Barker

On the other hand, former insurgent Samuel Katz admitted that the operation nabbed,

Almost all of the leaders and staff of the Irgun and Lehi, and the Tel Aviv manpower of both organizations.

— Katz

== Aftermath ==
The operation was mostly successful in that it stalled major insurgent activity until February 1947. International reactions to the operation were tempered by the fact that it was widely seen as a retaliatory action for the King David Bombing. Operation Shark did foster domestic support for an independent Jewish state and the end of the Mandate of Palestine.
