= Zionist political violence =

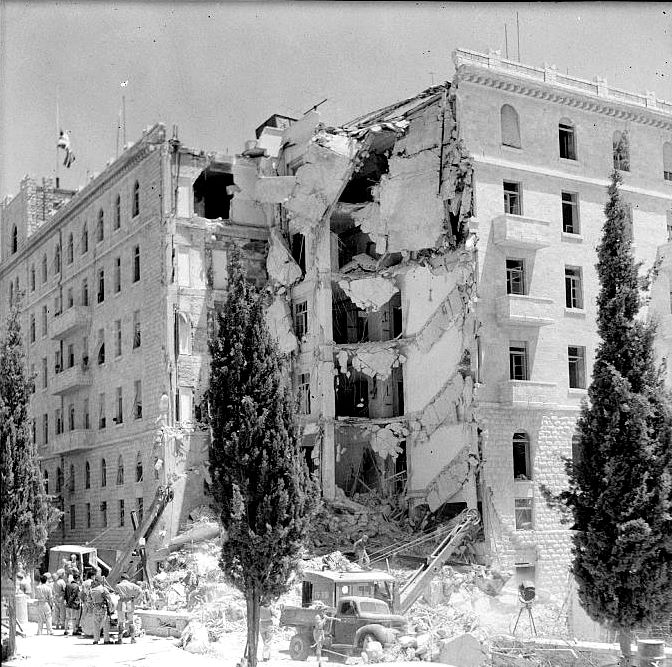
Aftermath of the King David Hotel bombing, blown up by the Irgun after Operation Agatha in 1946

Zionists have committed a number of acts of political violence in support of establishing and maintaining a Jewish state in Palestine. These actions have been carried out by individuals, paramilitary groups, and the State of Israel and its military forces since the early 20th century against British rule and as part of the ongoing Israeli–Palestinian conflict.

In the pre-state period (1920s–1940s), Zionist paramilitaries such as the Irgun, Lehi, Haganah and Palmach engaged in violent campaigns against British authorities, Palestinian Arabs, and more moderate Jews to advance their political goals. Targets included security personnel, government figures, civilians, and infrastructure. After Israel's establishment in 1948, the Israel Defense Forces (IDF) and other state security forces continued to employ violence against Palestinian and neighboring Arab populations during the 1948 war (known by Palestinians as the Nakba, catastrophe), subsequent Arab-Israeli wars, and the military occupation of the West Bank and Gaza Strip.

Later acts of Zionist violence have ranged from the government's use of force to suppress Palestinian unrest (such as during the intifadas from 1987 to 1993 and 2000 to 2005), to attacks perpetrated by Israeli settlers and right-wing extremists against Palestinian civilians, property and holy sites. In an act of intra-Jewish political violence, former Israeli Prime Minister Yitzhak Rabin was assassinated in 1995 by Yigal Amir who opposed Rabin's peace initiatives and territorial concessions to the Palestinians. The Israeli military has also conducted large-scale assaults in the occupied territories and neighbouring states including Lebanon, resulting in widespread destruction and civilian casualties.

Human and Palestinian rights organisations have accused Israel of state terrorism, war crimes, and disproportionate use of force against Palestinians. Israel defends its actions as necessary to preserve the security of the Jewish state and its citizens in the face of Palestinian political violence and regional threats.

== Prior to the establishment of the State of Israel ==
=== Zionist militant groups ===
Bar-Giora (Hebrew: בר גיורא, from Simon bar Giora; 1907–1909) was a militia of primarily of Russian Jewish immigrants founded to protect Jewish settlements during the second wave of Zionist migration to Palestine. In 1909, it expanded into HaShomer (השומר 'the watchman'), an armed paramilitary cavalry that was active until the establishment of the British Mandate for Palestine (1920–1948).

During the 1920 Nebi Musa riots, the 1921 Jaffa riots and the 1929 Palestine riots, Palestinian Arabs manifested hostility against Zionist immigration, which provoked the reaction of Jewish militias. After the 1920 Nebi Musa riots, the Haganah (ההגנה 'the defense') was founded in June and drew forces from the Zion Mule Corps and Jewish Legion, both of which fought for the British in World War I. Increasing Zionist migration to Palestine raised tensions and intercommunal conflict in Mandatory Palestine.

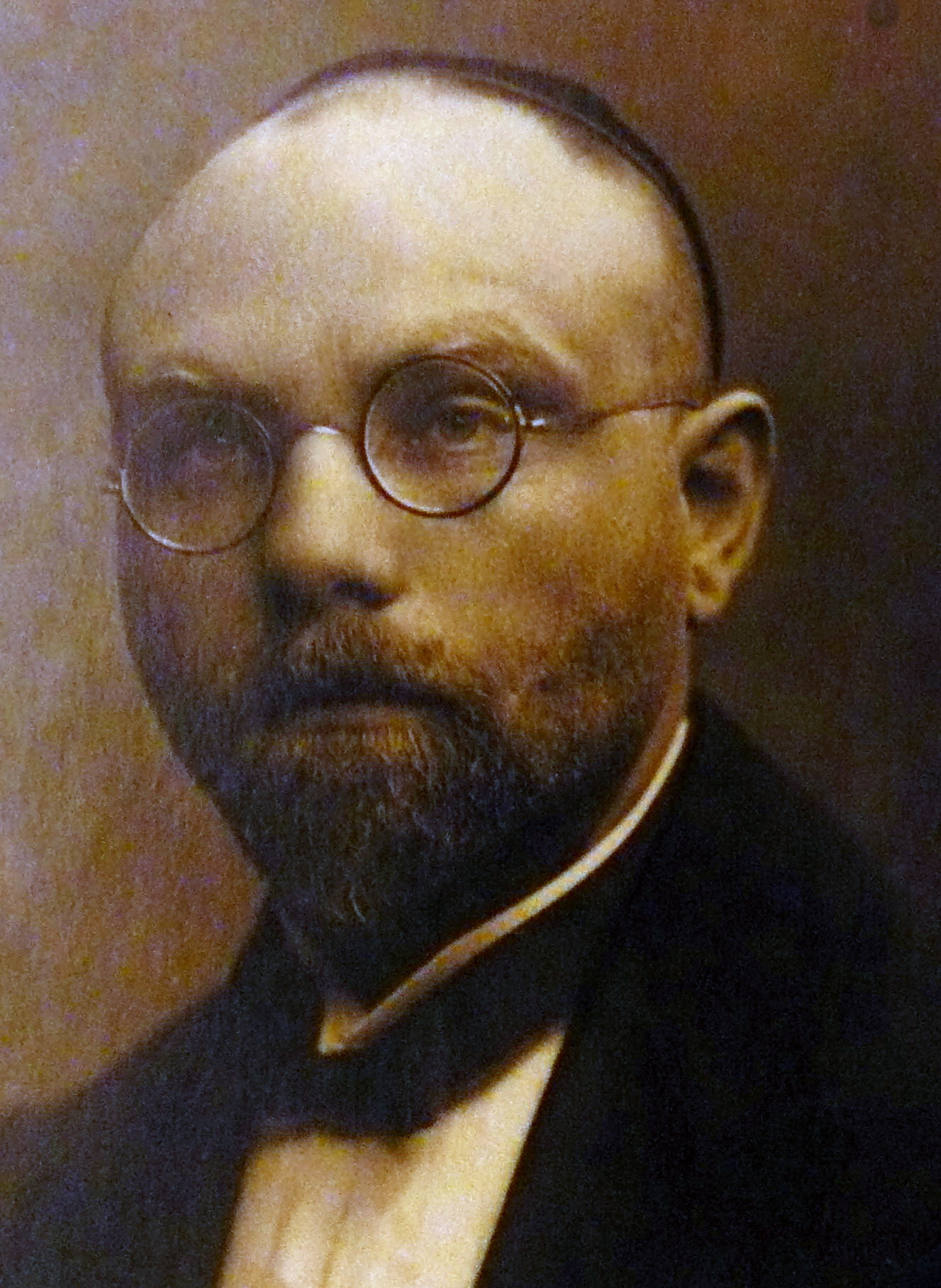
Dutch Jewish lawyer and journalist Jacob Israël de Haan was assassinated by the Haganah in Jerusalem in 1924.

In 1924, a Dutch Jewish anti-Zionist activist Jacob Israël de Haan was assassinated by members of the Haganah. According to Le Monde, "The practice of targeted elimination has been a constant feature of Israeli strategy, going back even before the creation of the state of Israel in 1948." Many of the victims of targeted killings by Israel have been Palestinian political leaders and militants, including Ghassan Kanafani, Wael Zwaiter, Wadie Haddad, Khalil al-Wazir, Khaled Nazzal, Fathi Shaqaqi, and others. Some, including Yasser Arafat and Khaled Mashal, have survived Israeli assassination attempts.

The assassination of Haim Arlosoroff in 1933 has never been solved although Revisionist Zionists associated with Abba Ahimeir and Brit HaBiryonim have been widely accused of involvement. Three members of Brit HaBiryonim were arrested and tried for the murder and all three were acquitted.

The Irgun (ארגון 'organization'; 1931–1948), associated with Betar and Revisionist Zionism, was founded as an offshoot of the Haganah. The Irgun were the armed expression of the nascent ideology of Revisionist Zionism founded by Ze'ev Jabotinsky. He expressed this ideology as "every Jew had the right to enter Palestine; only active retaliation would deter the Arab and the British; only Jewish armed force would ensure the Jewish state".

During the 1936–39 Arab revolt in Palestine, Palestinian Arabs fought for the end of the Mandate and the creation of an Arab state based on the whole of Palestine. They attacked both British and Jews as well as some Palestinian Arabs who supported Pan-Arabism. Mainstream Zionists, represented by the Vaad Leumi and the Haganah, practiced the policy of Havlagah (הבלגה 'restraint'). Irgun militants did not follow this policy and called themselves "Havlagah breakers." The Irgun began bombing Palestinian Arab civilian targets in 1938.

The Peulot Meyuhadot (פעולות מיוחדות) were three highly secret special-operations squads set up in Palestine by Yitzhak Sadeh on David Ben-Gurion's orders early in 1939, towards the end of the 1936–1939 Arab revolt in Palestine. The squads were created for retaliatory strikes against Arab resistants and villages, attacks on British installations, and the elimination of Jewish informers and traitors. The squads were controlled directly by Ben-Gurion, without reference to the Haganah general command, and were used repeatedly during the last months of the Arab revolt and during the months that followed.

While the Palestinian Arabs were "carefully disarmed" by the British Mandatory authorities by 1939, the Zionists were not.

Lehi (לח״י; 1940–1948), also known as the Stern Gang for its founder Avraham Stern, broke off from the Irgun in 1940 to keep fighting against the British. It also sought to make alliances with fascist Italy and Nazi Germany. The Palmach (פלמ״ח; 1941–1948) was established by the High Command of the Haganah in 1941 and served as the main paramilitary organization of the Yishuv, or the Jewish community in Palestine before 1948.

=== Jewish insurgency in Mandatory Palestine (1944–1948) ===
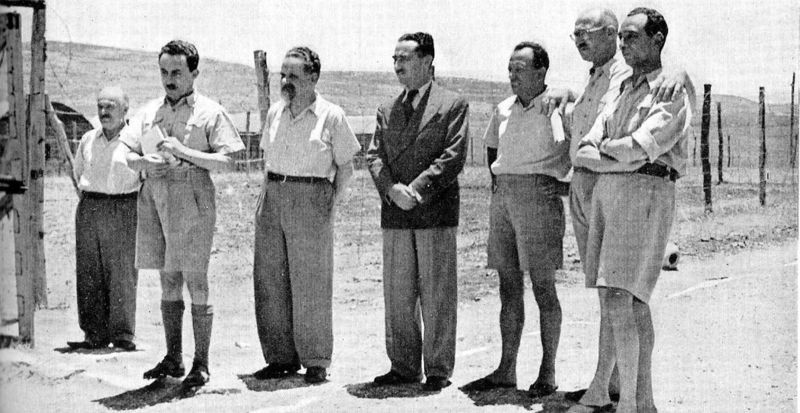
Zionist leaders arrested in Operation Agatha amid attacks by the Jewish Resistance Movement in the insurgency against the British. Left to right: David Remez, Moshe Sharett, Yitzhak Gruenbaum, Dov Yosef, Shenkarsky, David Hacohen, Halperin.

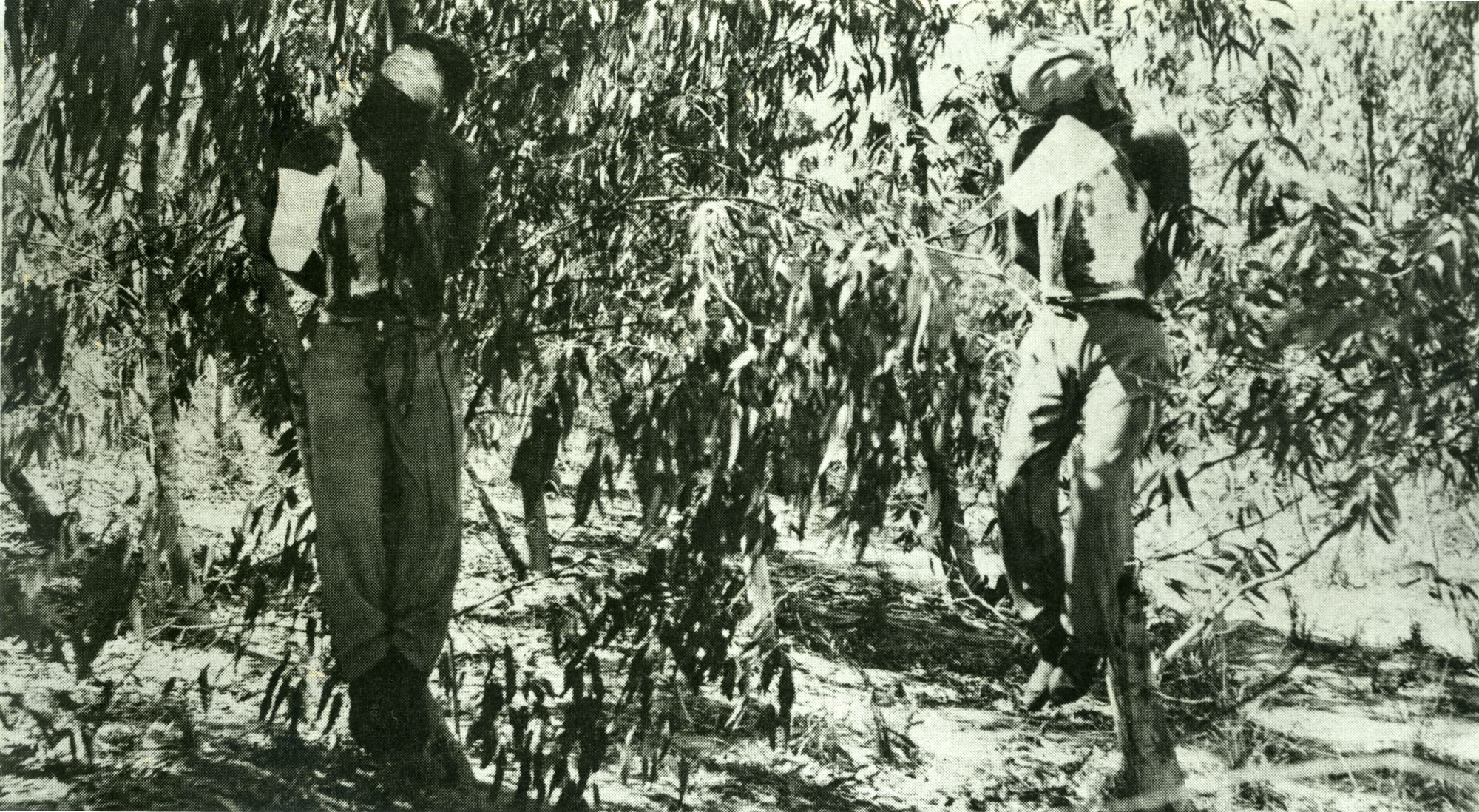
British sergeants Clifford Martin and Mervyn Paice kidnapped and hanged by the Zionist paramilitary organization Irgun in 1947.

After the British Declaration of War in September 1939, the head of the Jewish Agency for Palestine David Ben-Gurion declared: 'We will fight the White Paper as if there is no war, and fight the war as if there is no White Paper.' Subsequently, the Haganah and Irgun suspended their activity against the British in support of their war against Nazi Germany. However, the smaller Lehi continued anti-British attacks and direct action throughout the war. At that time, the British also supported the creation and the training of Palmach as a unit that could withstand a German offensive in the area, with the consent of the Yishuv, which saw an opportunity to get trained units and soldiers for the planned Jewish state. During 1944–1945, the most mainstream Jewish paramilitary organization, Haganah, cooperated with the British authorities against the Lehi and Etzel.

In the latter years of the British Mandate in Palestine, the Jewish insurgency (1944–48) especially targeted British personnel and officials, including Walter Guinness, 1st Baron Moyne in November 1944 and others.

After World War II, between 1945 and the 29 November 1947 Partition vote, British soldiers and policemen were targeted by Irgun and Lehi. The Haganah and Palmach at first collaborated with the British against them, particularly during the Hunting Season, before actively joining them in the Jewish Resistance Movement, then finally choosing an official neutral position after 1946 while the Irgun and the Lehi continued their attacks against the British.

The Jewish Agency organized the Jewish Resistance Movement (JRM), which included the Haganah, Palmach, Lehi, and Irgun. Its first operation was October 1945, when the Palmach attacked the Atlit internment camp to release Jews arrested by the British for illegal immigration into Palestine. In November, the JRM targeted railroads throughout Palestine and sank a number of British coast guard patrol launches. It then attacked British police stations, aerodromes, coast guard stations, and radar infrastructure, and in June 1946, it blew up bridges connecting Palestine with neighboring countries. In Operation Agatha, the British responded with arrests and searches of the bureaus of the Jewish Agency, the Histadrut, and 27 Jewish settlements. The Jewish Agency called for a halt to armed attacks on the British and their infrastructure, but Lehi and Irgun refused and bombed the King David Hotel, site of the central British administrative offices, in July 1946.

The Haganah, Irgun and Lehi also executed dozens of Jews for alleged treason or collaboration with Britain or Arabs, often after irregular drumhead courts-martial.

The Haganah also carried out violent attacks in Palestine, such as the liberation of interned immigrants from the Atlit detainee camp, the bombing of the country's railroad network, sabotage raids on radar installations and bases of the British Palestine police. It continued to organize illegal immigration throughout the entire war.

Irgun was described as a terrorist organization by the United Nations, British, and United States governments, and in media such as The New York Times newspaper, and by the Anglo-American Committee of Inquiry. In 1946, The World Zionist Congress strongly condemned terrorist activities in Palestine and "the shedding of innocent blood as a means of political warfare". Irgun was specifically condemned.

== The Nakba and the 1948 Palestine War ==
Clickable map of Mandatory Palestine with the depopulated locations during the 1948 Palestinian expulsion and flight

In February 1947, the British announced that they would end the mandate and withdraw from Palestine and they asked for the arbitration of the United Nations. After the vote on the Partition Plan for Palestine on 30 November 1947, civil war broke out in Palestine. Jewish and Arab communities fought each other violently in campaigns of attacks, retaliations, and counter-retaliations which provoked around 800 deaths after two months. Arab volunteers entered Palestine to fight alongside the Palestinian Arabs. In April, 6 weeks before the termination of the Mandate, the Jewish militias launched wide operations to control the territory dedicated to them by the Partition Plan. Many atrocities occurred during this time. The Arab population in the mixed cities of Tiberias, Safed, Haifa and Jaffa, as well as Beisan and Acre and in the neighbouring villages, fled or were expelled during this period. During the Battle for Jerusalem (1948) where the Jewish community of 100,000 people was besieged, most Arab villages of the Tel Aviv – Jerusalem corridor were captured by Jewish militias and leveled.

At the beginning of the civil war, the Jewish militias organized several bombing attacks against civilians and military Arab targets. On 12 December, Irgun placed a car bomb opposite the Damascus Gate, killing 20 people. On 4 January 1948, the Lehi detonated a lorry bomb against the headquarters of the paramilitary Najjada located in Jaffa's Town Hall, killing 15 Arabs and injuring 80. During the night between 5 and 6 January, the Haganah bombed the Semiramis Hotel in Jerusalem that had been reported to hide Arab militiamen, killing 24 people. The next day, Irgun members in a stolen police van rolled a barrel bomb into a large group of civilians who were waiting for a bus by the Jaffa Gate, killing around 16. Another Irgun bomb went off in the Ramla market on February 18, killing 7 residents and injuring 45. On 28 February, the Palmah organised a bombing attack against a garage in Haifa, killing 30 people.

In Plan Dalet (1 April 1948 –14 May 1948), a military plan developed by the Haganah, Zionist forces depopulated and destroyed Palestinian villages to deliver the fait accompli of conquered territory for the establishment of the State of Israel. Zionist forces terrorized Palestinian communities to encourage flight.

On April 9, Zionist forces attacked the village of Deir Yassin near Jerusalem, killing at least 107 Palestinian villagers, including women and children, in the Deir Yassin massacre.

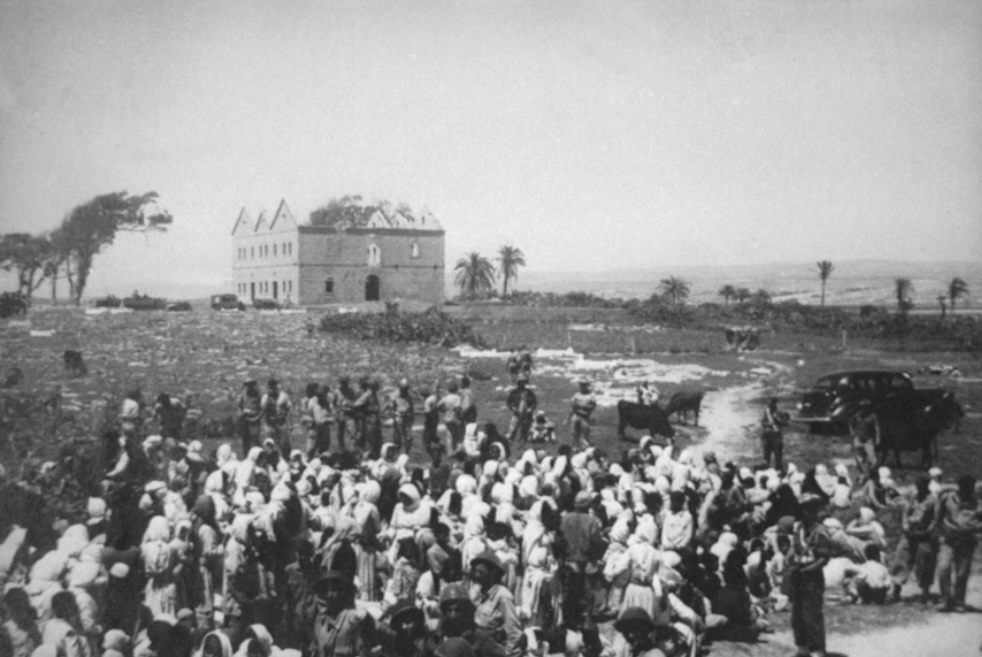
Israeli soldiers with detained Palestinian women and children in Tantura on May 23 1948, the date of the Tantura massacre.

May 22–23, 1948, the Alexandroni Brigade of the Haganah carried out the Tantura massacre, in which Israeli soldiers killed an estimated dozens to over 200 Palestinian villagers. The Palestinian victims were buried in mass graves and the Israeli settlements of Nahsholim, settled by migrants from Romania and Turkey, and Dor, by migrants from Greece, were established on the village's territory.

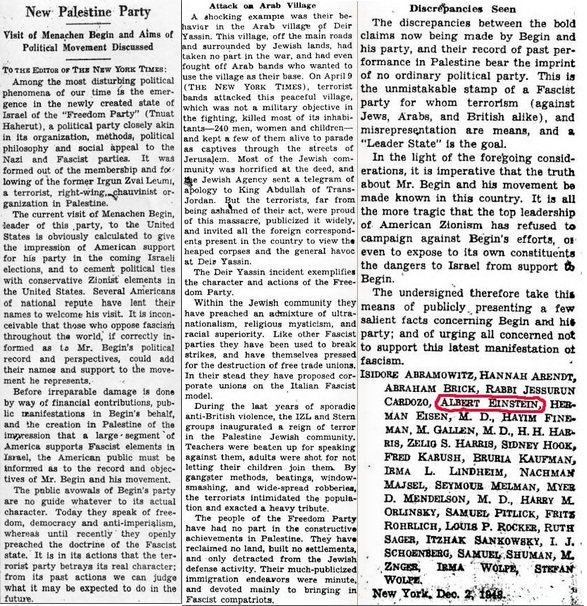
Hannah Arendt, Jessurun Cardozo, Albert Einstein and others letter

Menachem Begin was called a terrorist and a fascist by Albert Einstein and 27 other prominent Jewish intellectuals in a letter to the New York Times which was published on December 4, 1948. Specifically condemned was the participation of the Irgun in the Deir Yassin massacre:

terrorist bands attacked this peaceful village, which was not a military objective in the fighting, killed most of its inhabitants – 240 men, women and children – and kept a few of them alive to parade as captives through the streets of Jerusalem.

The letter warns American Jews against supporting Begin's request for funding of his political party Herut, and ends with the warning:

The discrepancies between the bold claims now being made by Begin and his party and their record of past performance in Palestine bear the imprint of no ordinary political party. This is the unmistakable stamp of a Fascist party for whom terrorism (against Jews, Arabs, and British alike), and misrepresentation are means, and a "Leader State" is the goal.

Lehi was described as a terrorist organization by the British authorities and United Nations mediator Ralph Bunche.

=== Assassination of Folke Bernadotte ===
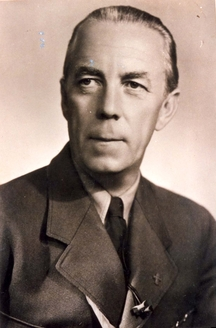
The Zionist paramilitary group Lehi assassinated Folke Bernadotte, a Swedish diplomat serving as United Nations Security Council mediator in the Arab–Israeli conflict, on September 17, 1948 in Jerusalem.

Folke Bernadotte, a Swedish diplomat unanimously chosen to be the UN Security Council mediator in Palestine, was assassinated in Jerusalem in September 1948 by Lehi, which was operating independently of Israel.

=== Operation Cast Thy Bread ===
Israel employed biological warfare against Palestinians by poisoning village wells. Benny Morris reported that Israeli soldiers transported typhoid germs in bottles to the southern front. British, Arab, and Red Cross documents reveal that Zionist forces introduced poison into wells in Acre and Eilabun in Galilee, leading to severe illness among dozens of local residents. Acre, which was allocated to a future Arab state by the United Nations Partition Plan for Palestine, heavily relied on its aqueduct for water. The contamination of these wells triggered a typhoid epidemic and "state of extreme distress" among the inhabitants, as noted by the mayor of Acre on 3 May. The Carmeli Brigade of the Haganah allegedly used a biological weapon in the battle of Acre in May 1948. In June, an Israeli intelligence report concluded that deliberately inducing the epidemic had played a significant role in Acre's rapid fall to Haganah forces.

== Since the establishment of the State of Israel ==
=== Kafr Qasim massacre ===
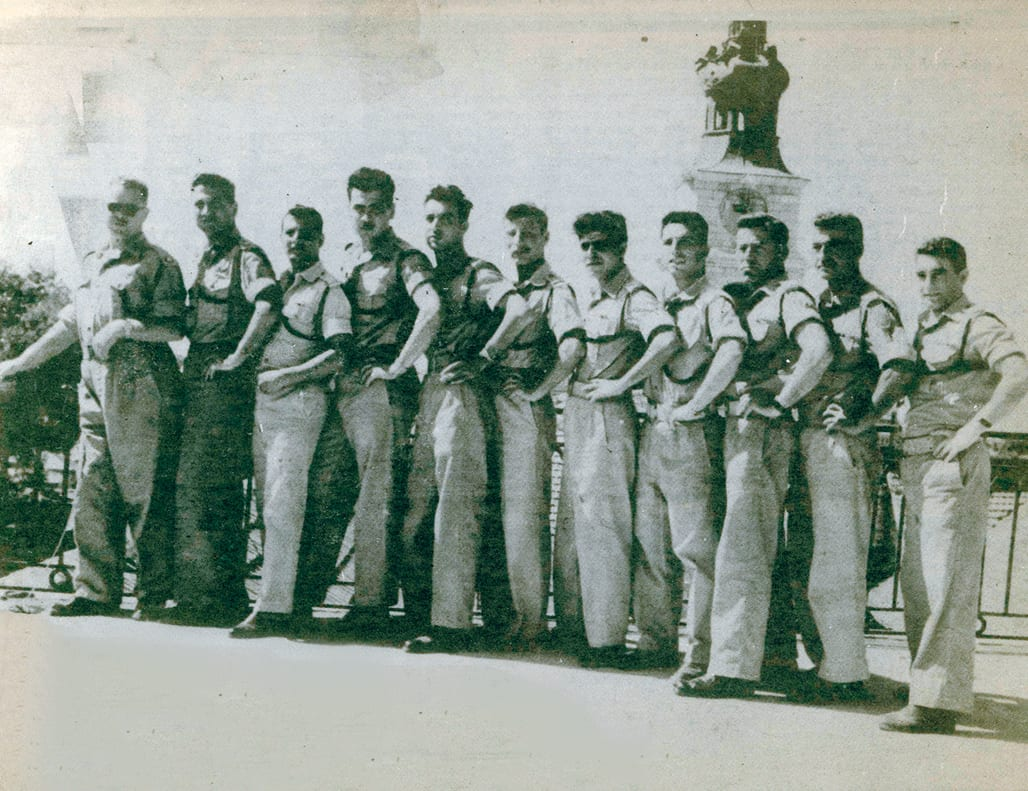
The eleven Israeli soldiers accused of perpetrating the massacre. Battalion commander Shmuel Melinki on the left.

The Kafr Qasim massacre was the killing by the paramilitary Israel Border Police of 49 Palestinian civilians, including 19 men, 6 women and 23 children, in Kafr Qasim, an Arab village on the Israeli side of the Green Line, on 29 October 1956, the eve of the Sinai War. Israeli forces had imposed a curfew on the village in the morning of October 29, and when a number of villagers who had been away and were unaware of the curfew returned, they were massacred.

=== Lavon affair ===
In 1954, Israeli military intelligence recruited a group of Egyptian Jews for an attempted covert false flag operation to plant bombs inside Egyptian-, American-, and British-owned civilian targets: cinemas, libraries, and American educational centers in Egypt. The bombs were timed to detonate several hours after closing time. The attacks were to be blamed on the Muslim Brotherhood, Egyptian communists, "unspecified malcontents", or "local nationalists" with the aim of creating a climate of sufficient violence and instability to induce the British government to retain its occupying troops in Egypt's Suez Canal zone. The operation caused no casualties among the population, but resulted in the deaths of four operatives.

=== Sabra and Shatila massacre ===
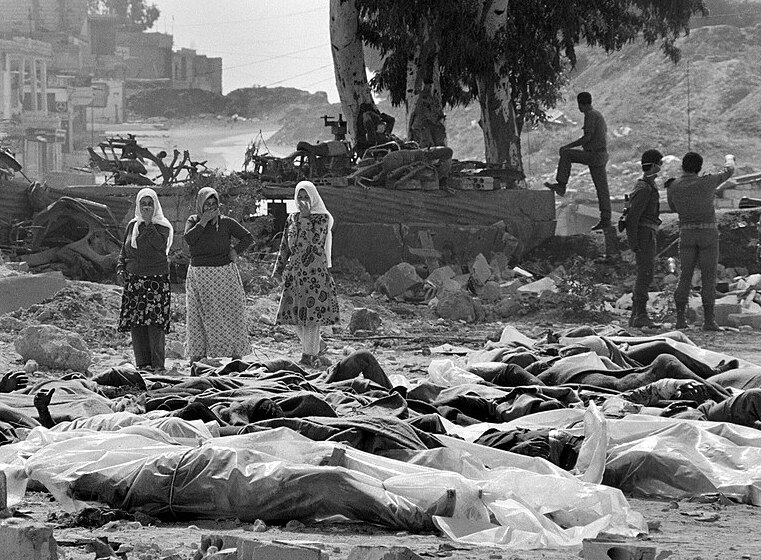
Cadavers of Palestinian refugees piling up in the Shatila refugee camp in Beirut, after the massacre of September 16-18, 1982, by the Lebanese Forces, a Christian militia, with the agreement of the Israeli army occupying the area.

From 16 to 18 September 1982, between 1,300 and 3,500 civilians—mostly Palestinians and Lebanese Shias—were killed in Beirut's Sabra neighbourhood and the adjacent Shatila refugee camp by the Lebanese Forces, one of the main Christian militias in Lebanon, with the support of the Israel Defense Forces (IDF).

Rashid Khalidi, based on documents leaked from the Israel State Archives in 2012 as well as secret appendices from the Kahan Commission that were not in the original 1983 report, writes that the Israeli government consciously decided to send Christian militias into the Sabra and Shatila refugee camps with the clear intention to instigate the Sabra and Shatila massacre.

=== Jewish Underground ===
The Jewish Underground (Hebrew: המחתרת היהודית HaMakhteret HaYehudit), or in abbreviated form, simply Makhteret, was a radical right-wing fundamentalist organization considered terrorist by Israel, formed by prominent members of the Israeli political movement Gush Emunim that existed from 1979 to 1984. The Jewish Underground developed two operational objectives: One consisted of a plot to blow up the Dome of the Rock, while the other branch concentrated on both avenging acts of Palestinian violence against settlers and of establishing a punitive deterrence. Some understood the terrorist acts as a means of inducing Palestinians to flee their homeland, based on the 1948 and 1967 experience, and parallels are drawn to the Terror Against Terror movement, which had a similar aim. Robert I. Friedman stated that the Makhteret was "the most violent anti-Arab terrorist organization since the birth of Israel".

=== Cave of the Patriarchs massacre ===
On 25 February 1994, Baruch Goldstein, an American-Israeli physician and member of the far-right ultra-Zionist Kach movement, carried out a mass shooting of Palestinians who were praying in the Ibrahimi Mosque (Cave of the Patriarchs) in Hebron. Goldstein, dressed in Israeli army uniform, opened fire with an assault rifle and killed 29 people, including children as young as 12, and wounded 125 others. Goldstein was overpowered and beaten to death by survivors.

=== Assassination of Yitzhak Rabin ===
In 1995, Yigal Amir, an Israeli student at Bar-Ilan University, assassinated the Prime Minister of Israel Yitzhak Rabin after a peace rally in support of the Oslo Accords. Amir had been opposed to the Oslo Accords and Israel's withdrawal from the West Bank. He believed that Rabin was a rodef, meaning a "pursuer" who endangered Jewish lives, and that he was justified in removing Rabin as a threat to Jews in the territories according to the concept of din rodef ("law of the pursuer"), which is a part of traditional Jewish law.

=== Kidnapping and murder of Mohammed Abu Khdeir ===
The kidnapping and murder of Mohammed Abu Khdeir occurred early on the morning of 2 July 2014. Khdeir, a 16-year-old Palestinian, was forced into a car by Israeli citizens on an occupied East Jerusalem street. His family immediately reported the fact to Israeli Police who located his charred body a few hours later at Givat Shaul in the Jerusalem Forest. Preliminary results from the autopsy suggested that he was beaten and burnt while still alive.

=== Israeli settler violence ===
Israeli settlers have carried out acts of violence, intimidation, property damage, and other reported attacks mainly in the West Bank against Palestinians. Israeli settler violence has been documented since at least the late 20th century and includes incidents such as physical assaults, arson, vandalism, sexual violence, and shootings. Human rights and international organisations describe the system of control in the occupied territories as amounting to Israeli apartheid and report systematic violence in this context. Multiple reports have also described cases in which Israeli security forces were either accompanying or reportedly supporting the attackers, raising concerns over enforcement and accountability.

Settler violence has been committed by gangs such as Lehava or the Hilltop Youth. This violence has included 'price tag attacks'.

=== Great March of Return ===
During the Great March of Return—a series of protest marches to the Gaza–Israel border from 30 March 2018 to 27 December 2019 in support of the right of return of Palestinian refugees—Israeli soldiers killed a total of 223 Palestinians.

=== Gaza genocide ===
Observers have described the genocide of the Palestinians in Gaza as part of the ongoing Nakba.

=== Ayit massacre plot ===
In September 2026, Israeli prosecutors arrested Bar-Ilan University mathematics professor Shahar Nevo for allegedly developing and attempting to recruit Israelis to participate in a terrorist plot against Arab Israelis and Palestinians. The plot was named “Am Ya’ase Transfer,” or “A nation will carry out a transfer,” and was designed to induce Palestinians in the West Bank and Israel to flee the country following massacres carried out by plot members. In October, Nevo was charged with preparation to commit an act of terrorism, extortion by threats and obstruction of justice. According to the indictment, the plot involved recruiting 71 Israeli shooters to kill some 600 to 700 people and had been in development since February 2023. The scheme was reported to police after its plotter allegedly first tried to recruit Israeli politician Moshe Feiglin to help recruit the shooters, and then attempted to pressure Feiglin into cooperating. Nevo has asserted in court that he is psychologically "normal" and called for the release of his plan to the public; only the first page had been released by prosecutors.

== Incitement to violence ==
Israelis on Jerusalem Day 2025 near Damascus Gate, the lyrics: Listen carefully you Arabs, we don't forgive and the song always remains: "May your village burn down"

Since 2011, Israeli nationalists have made anti-Palestinian chants such as "death to Arabs" (Israeli Hebrew: מָוֶת לָעֲרָבִים, romanized: Mávet la'Aravím) in parades on Jerusalem Day. Other chants include "May Your Village Burn," "Muhammad is dead," "a Jew is a soul, an Arab is a son of a whore," "burn Shu'afat" or "Shu'afat is on fire" in reference to the Palestinian neighborhood in East Jerusalem where a Palestinian boy was kidnapped and set on fire, as well as the Hebrew curse with Biblical origins for enemies of the Jewish people "may their name be erased." According to Nadera Shalhoub-Kevorkian, the Jerusalem Day parade is a "spatialized enactment of power," and in 2015, "over 30,000 young religious and nationalist Israeli Jews rampaged throughout the Old City of OEJ chanting 'Death to Arabs', 'Muhammad is Dead' and other racist slogans, restructuring the sensory experiences of Palestinians in the space."

== Irgun, Haganah and Lehi attacks ==
- June 30, 1924 Dutch Jewish anti-Zionist activist Jacob Israël de Haan was assassinated by Avraham Tehomi on the orders of Haganah leader Yitzhak Ben-Zvi for his anti-Zionist political activities and contacts with Arab leaders.
- 1937–1939 During the later stages of the 1936-1939 Arab Revolt in Mandatory Palestine The Irgun conducted a campaign of violence against Palestinian Arab civilians resulting in the deaths of at least 250. The group also killed a number of Jews it deemed guilty of "treason."
- July 15, 1938 A bomb left in the vegetable market in Jerusalem by the Irgun injured 28.
- July 25, 1938 The Irgun threw a bomb into the melon market in Haifa resulting in 49 deaths.
- November 6, 1944 Lehi assassinated British minister Lord Moyne in Cairo, Kingdom of Egypt. The action was condemned by the Yishuv at the time, but the bodies of the assassins were brought home from Egypt in 1975 to a state funeral and burial on Mount Herzl.
- 1944–1945 The killings of several suspected collaborators with the Haganah and the British mandate government during the Hunting Season.
- 1946 Letter bombs sent to British officials, including foreign minister Ernst Bevin, by Lehi.
- July 26, 1946 The bombing of British administrative headquarters at the King David Hotel, killing 91 people — 28 British, 41 Arab, 17 Jewish, and 5 others. Around 45 people were injured. In the literature about the practice and history of terrorism, it has been called one of the most lethal terrorist attacks of the 20th century.
- October 31, 1946 The bombing by the Irgun of the British Embassy in Rome. Nearly half the building was destroyed and 3 people were injured.
- April 16, 1947 An Irgun bomb placed at the Colonial Office in London failed to detonate. The woman arrested for planting the bomb, alias "Esther," was identified as a Jewess claiming French nationality by the Scotland Yard unit investigating Jewish terrorist activities. The attack was linked to the 1946 Rome embassy bombing.
- 14 June 1947 The Reuters office in Tel Aviv was raided by "Jewish terrorists."
- July 25, 1947 The Sergeants affair: When death sentences were passed on two Irgun members, the Irgun kidnapped Sgt. Clifford Martin and Sgt. Mervyn Paice and threatened to kill them in retaliation if the sentences were carried out. When the threat was ignored, the hostages were killed. Afterwards, their bodies were taken to an orange grove and left hanging by the neck from trees. An improvised explosive device was set. This went off when one of the bodies was cut down, seriously wounding a British officer.
- 1947 Letter bombs sent to the Truman White House by Lehi.
- January 5–6, 1948 The Semiramis Hotel bombing, carried out by the Haganah (or, according to some sources, Irgun) resulted in the deaths of 24 to 26 people.
- April 1948 The Deir Yassin massacre carried out by the Irgun and Lehi, killed between 107 and 120 Palestinian villagers, the estimate generally accepted by scholars.
- September 17, 1948 Lehi assassination of the United Nations mediator Folke Bernadotte, whom Lehi accused of a pro-Arab stance during the cease-fire negotiations.

== Analysis ==
According to Mohammed M. Hafez and Joseph M. Hatfield, "Targeted assassinations do not decrease rates of Palestinian violence, nor do they increase them, whether in the short or long run. Targeted assassinations may be useful as a political tool to signal a state’s determination to punish terrorists and placate an angry public, but there is little evidence that they actually impact the course of an insurgency."

According to Nir Gazit and Robert Brym, "the second intifada appears to have led many Israeli decision-makers to favour creating chaos in the Palestinian political system, a goal that was well served by the policy of political assassination. The policy’s effect was to forestall the founding of a viable, independent Palestinian state."

=== Public opinion and perception ===
During the conflict between Arabs and Jews in Palestine before the war, the criterion of "Purity of arms" was used to distinguish between the respective attitudes of the Irgun and Haganah towards Arabs, with the latter priding itself on its adherence to principle. The Jewish society in the British Mandate Palestine generally disapproved and denounced violent attacks both on grounds of moral rejection and political disagreement, stressing that terrorism is counter-productive in the Zionist quest for Jewish self-determination. Generally speaking, this precept requires that "weapons remain pure [and that] they are employed only in self-defence and [never] against innocent civilians and defenceless people". But if it "remained a central value in education" it was "rather vague and intentionally blurred" at the practical level.

In 1946, at a meeting held between the heads of the Haganah, David Ben-Gurion predicted a confrontation between the Arabs of Palestine and the Arab states. Concerning the "principle of purity of arms", he stressed that: "The end does not justify all means. Our war is based on moral grounds" and during the 1948 War, the Mapam, the political party affiliated with Palmach, asked for "a strict observance of the Jewish Purity of arms to secure the moral character of [the] war". When he was later criticized by Mapam members for his attitude concerning the Arab refugee problem, Ben-Gurion reminded them of the Palestinian expulsion from Lydda and Ramle and the fact Palmah officers had been responsible for the "outrage that had encouraged the Arabs' flight made the party uncomfortable."

According to Avi Shlaim, this condemnation of the use of violence is one of the key features of 'the conventional Zionist account or old history' whose 'popular-heroic-moralistic version' is 'taught in Israeli schools and used extensively in the quest for legitimacy abroad'. Benny Morris adds that '[t]he Israelis' collective memory of fighters characterized by "purity of arms" is also undermined by the evidence of [the dozen cases] of rapes committed in conquered towns and villages.' According to him, 'after the 1948 war, the Israelis tended to hail the "purity of arms" of their militiamen and soldiers to contrast this with Arab barbarism, which on occasion expressed itself in the mutilation of captured Jewish corpses.' According to him, 'this reinforced the Israelis' positive self-image and helped them "sell" the new state abroad and (...) demonized the enemy'.

Some Israelis justify acts of political violence. Sixty years after participating in the assassination of Swedish diplomat Folke Bernadotte, Geulah Cohen had no regrets. As a broadcaster on Lehi's radio, she recalled the threats against Bernadotte in advance of the assassination. "I told him if you are not going to leave Jerusalem and go to your Stockholm, you won't be any more." Asked if it was right to assassinate Bernadotte, she replied, "There is no question about it. We would not have Jerusalem any more."

In July 2006, the Menachem Begin Heritage Center organized a conference to mark the 60th anniversary of the King David Hotel bombing. The conference was attended by past and future Prime Minister Benjamin Netanyahu and former members of Irgun. The British Ambassador in Tel Aviv and the Consul-General in Jerusalem protested that a plaque commemorating the bombing stated "For reasons known only to the British, the hotel was not evacuated." Netanyahu, then chairman of Likud and Leader of the Opposition in the Knesset, opined that the bombing was a legitimate act with a military target, distinguishing it from an act of terror intended to harm civilians since Irgun sent warnings to evacuate the building. He said "Imagine that Hamas or Hizbullah would call the military headquarters in Tel Aviv and say, 'We have placed a bomb and we are asking you to evacuate the area.' They don't do that. That is the difference."

The British Ambassador in Tel Aviv and the Consul-General in Jerusalem protested, saying "We do not think that it is right for an act of terrorism, which led to the loss of many lives, to be commemorated", and wrote to the Mayor of Jerusalem that such an "act of terror" could not be honored. The British government also demanded the removal of the plaque, pointing out that the statement on it accusing the British of failing to evacuate the hotel was untrue and "did not absolve those who planted the bomb." To prevent a diplomatic incident, changes were made in the plaque's text. The final English version says "Warning phone calls have been made to the hotel, The Palestine Post and the French Consulate, urging the hotel's occupants to leave immediately. The hotel was not evacuated and after 25 minutes the bombs exploded. To the Irgun's regret, 92 persons were killed."

== See also ==
- Criticism of Israel
- Jewish terrorism
- Kahanism
- Jewish Defense League
- Nationalist terrorism
- Neo-Zionism
- Palestinian political violence
- Jewish fundamentalism
- List of Israeli assassinations
