= King David Hotel bombing =

1946 terrorist attack in Jerusalem

Coordinates: 31°46′28″N 35°13′21″E

- Part of the Jewish insurgency in Palestine
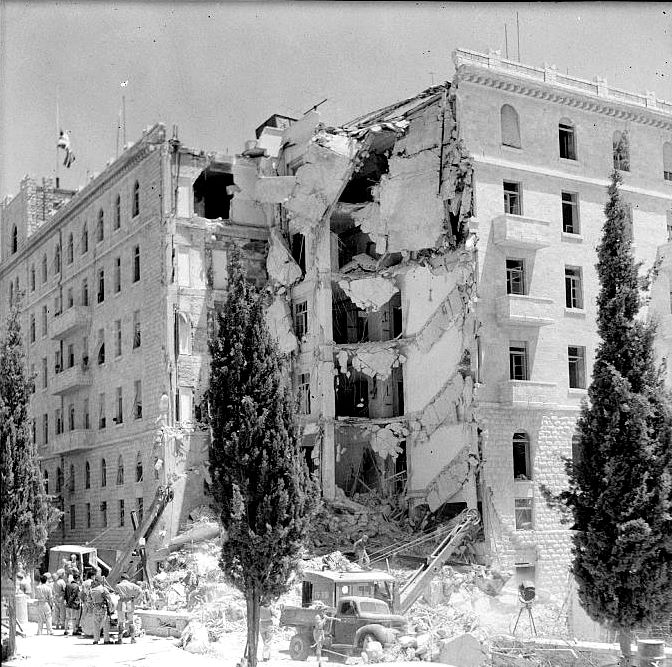
- The hotel after the bombing
- Location: Jerusalem, Mandatory Palestine
- Date: 22 July 1946; 12:37 pm (UTC+2)
- Target: King David Hotel
- Attack type: Zionist terrorism, bombing, mass murder
- Deaths: 91
- Injuries: 46
- Perpetrator: Irgun
- Motive: Destruction of evidence, Jewish extremism

The British administrative headquarters for Mandatory Palestine, housed in the southern wing of the King David Hotel in Jerusalem, were bombed in a terrorist attack on 22 July 1946, by the militant right-wing Zionist underground organization Irgun during the Jewish insurgency. 91 people of various nationalities were killed, including Arabs, Britons and Jews, and 46 were injured.

The hotel was the site of the central offices of the British Mandatory authorities of Palestine, principally the Secretariat of the Government of Palestine and the Headquarters of the British Armed Forces in Palestine and Transjordan. When planned, the attack had the approval of the Haganah, the principal Jewish paramilitary group in Palestine, though, unbeknownst to the Irgun, this had been cancelled by the time the operation was carried out. The main motive of the bombing was to destroy documents incriminating the Jewish Agency in attacks against the British, which were obtained during Operation Agatha, a series of raids by mandate authorities. It was the deadliest attack directed at the British during the Mandate era (1920–1948).

Disguised as Arab workmen and as hotel waiters, members of the Irgun planted a bomb in the basement of the main building of the hotel, whose southern wing housed the Mandate Secretariat and a few offices of the British military headquarters. The resulting explosion caused the collapse of the western half of the southern wing of the hotel. Some of the deaths and injuries occurred in the road outside the hotel and in adjacent buildings.

Controversy has arisen over the timing and adequacy of any warnings. The Irgun stated subsequently that warnings were delivered by telephone; Thurston Clarke states that the first warning was delivered by a 16-year-old recruit to the hotel switchboard 15 minutes before the explosion. The British Government said after the inquest that no warning had been received by anyone at the Secretariat "in an official position with any power to take action".

== Background ==
=== Motivation ===
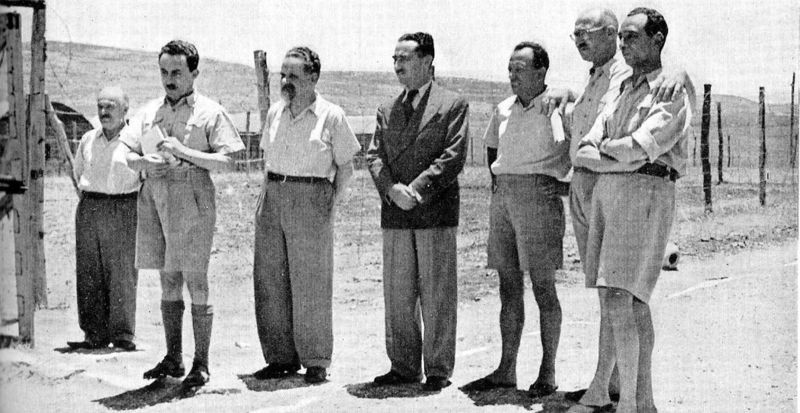
Zionist leaders arrested in Operation Agatha. Left to right: David Remez, Moshe Sharett, Yitzhak Gruenbaum, Dov Yosef, Shenkarsky, David Hacohen, Halperin.

The Irgun committed the attack in response to Operation Agatha, known in Israel as "Black Saturday". British troops had searched the Jewish Agency on 29 June and confiscated large quantities of documents directly implicating the Haganah in the Jewish insurgency against Britain. The intelligence information was taken to the King David Hotel, where it was initially kept in the offices of the Secretariat in the southern wing. The Irgun was determined to destroy that wing of the hotel in order to destroy the incriminating documents.

=== Hotel layout ===
In plan form, the six-story hotel, which was opened in 1932 as the first modern luxury hotel in Jerusalem, had an I-shape, with a long central axis connecting wings to the north and south. Julian's Way, a main road, ran parallel and close to the west side of the hotel. An unsurfaced lane, where the French Consulate was situated and from where access to the service entrance of the hotel was gained, ran from there past the north end of the hotel. Gardens and an olive grove, which had been designated as a park, surrounded the other sides.

=== Government and military usage ===
In 1946, the Secretariat occupied most of the southern wing of the hotel, with the military headquarters occupying the top floor of the south wing and the top, second and third floors of the middle of the hotel. The military telephone exchange was situated in the basement. An annex housed the military police and a branch of the Criminal Investigation Department of the Palestine Police.

Rooms had first been requisitioned in the hotel in late 1938, on what was supposed to be a temporary basis. Plans had already been made to erect a permanent building for the Secretariat and Army GHQ, but these were cancelled after the Second World War broke out, at which point more than two-thirds of the hotel's rooms were being used for government and army purposes.

In March 1946, British Labour Party Member of Parliament (MP) Richard Crossman described activity at the hotel: "Private detectives, Zionist agents, Arab sheiks, special correspondents, and the rest, all sitting around about discreetly overhearing each other." Security analyst Bruce Hoffman has written that the hotel "housed the nerve centre of British rule in Palestine".

=== Previous attacks ===
Amichai Paglin, chief of operations of the Irgun, developed a remote-controlled mortar with a range of four miles that was nicknamed the V3 by British military engineers. In 1945, after attacks using the mortar had been executed against several police stations, six V3s were buried in the olive grove park south of the King David Hotel. Three were aimed at the government printing press and three at the hotel itself. The intention was to fire them on the king's birthday, but the Haganah learned about the plan and warned the British through Teddy Kollek of the Jewish Agency. Army sappers then located and removed the buried V3s. On another occasion, members of an unknown group threw grenades at the hotel but missed.

== Preparations ==
=== Planning ===
The leaders of Haganah opposed the idea initially. On 1 July 1946, Moshe Sneh, chief of the Haganah General Headquarters, sent a letter to the then leader of the Irgun, Menachem Begin, which instructed him to "carry out the operation at the 'chick'", code for the King David Hotel. (Note: The original letter can be found in the Jabotinsky Institute Archives (k-4 1/11/5).) Despite this approval for the project, repeated delays in executing the operation were requested by the Haganah, in response to changes unfolding in the political situation. The plan was finalized between Amichai Paglin (Irgun alias 'Gidi'), Chief of Operations of the Irgun, and Itzhak Sadeh, commander of the Palmach.

In the plan, Irgun men, disguised as Arabs, except for Gideon, the leader, who would be dressed as one of the hotel's distinctive Sudanese waiters, would enter the building through a basement service entrance carrying the explosives concealed in milk cans. The cans were to be placed by the main columns supporting the wing where the majority of the offices used by the British authorities were located. The columns were in a basement nightclub known as the Régence. In the final review of the plan, it was decided that the attack would take place on 22 July at 11:00, a time when there would be no people in the coffee shop in the basement in the area where the bomb was to be planted. It would be possible to enter the hotel more easily at that time as well.

It would have been impossible to have planted the bomb in the Régence any later than 14:00 because it was always full of customers after that time. The timing was also determined by the original intention that the attack should coincide with another, carried out by the Lehi, on government offices at the David Brothers Building. Codenamed "Operation Your Slave and Redeemer", this one was cancelled at the last moment. The Irgun said details of the plan were aimed at minimizing civilian casualties. Irgun reports allegedly included explicit precautions so that the whole area would be evacuated. This led to recriminations between the Haganah and Irgun later. The Haganah said that they had specified that the attack should take place later in the day when the offices would have been emptier of people.

=== Warnings ===
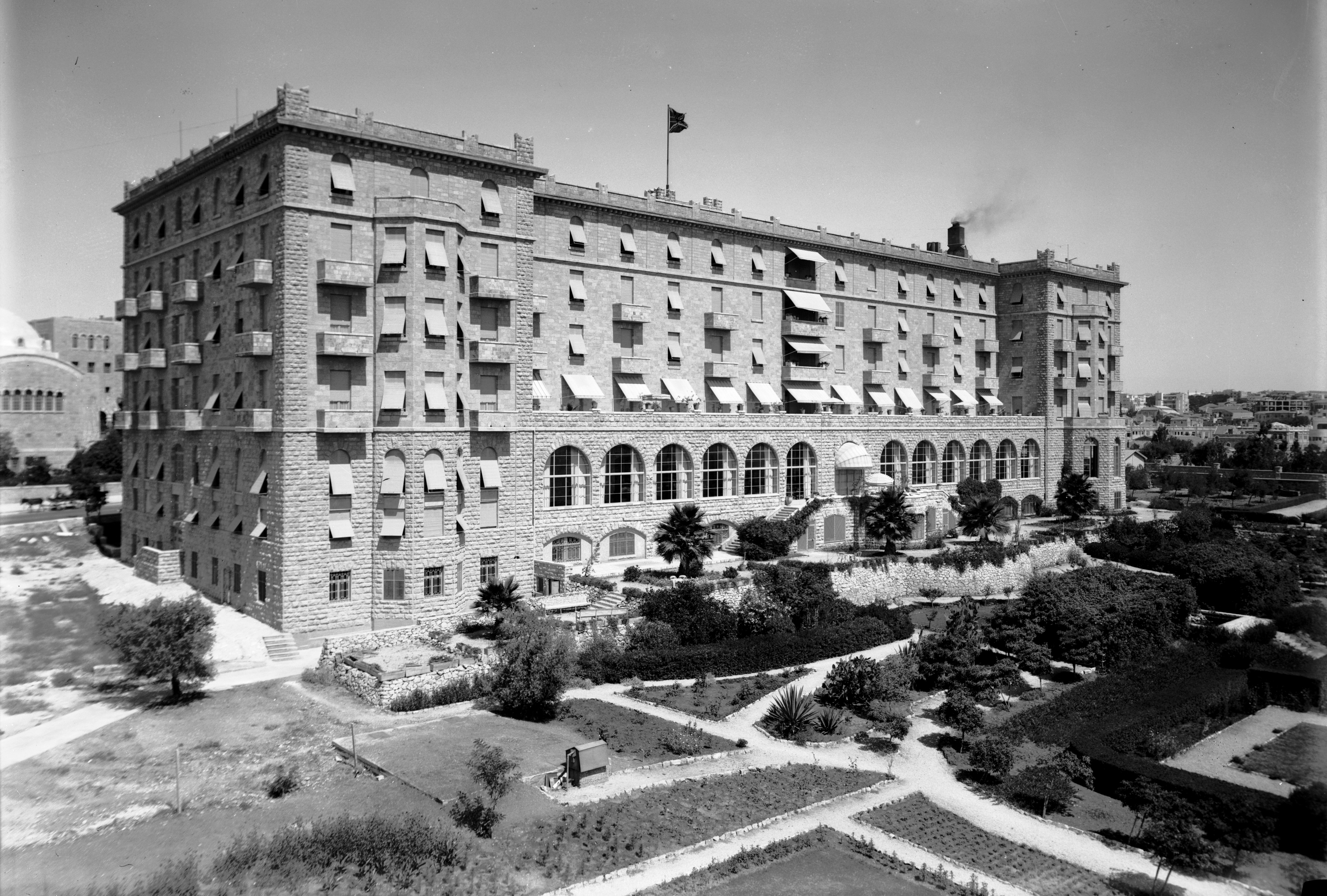
Rear of the hotel, 1931

Since the bombing, much controversy has ensued over the issues of when warnings were sent and how the British authorities responded. Irgun representatives have always stated that the warning was given well in advance of the explosion so that adequate time was available to evacuate the hotel. Menachem Begin, for example, wrote that the telephone message was delivered 25–27 minutes before the explosion. The British government said, five months after the bombing, once the subsequent inquest and all inquiries had been completed, that no such warnings had been received by anyone at the Secretariat "in an official position with any power to take action". Begin directly accused Chief Secretary of the Palestine Mandate, John Shaw, of ignoring a warning, which he denied having received. (see Sir John Shaw controversy)

American author Thurston Clarke's analysis of the bombing gave timings for calls and for the explosion, which he said took place at 12:37. He stated that as part of the Irgun plan, a 16-year-old recruit, Adina Hay (alias Tehia), was to make three warning calls before the attack. At 12:22 the first call was made, in both Hebrew and English, to a telephone operator on the hotel's switchboard (the Secretariat and the military each had their own, separate, telephone exchanges). It was ignored. At 12:27, the second warning call was made to the French Consulate adjacent to the hotel to the north-east. This second call was taken seriously, and staff went through the building opening windows and closing curtains to lessen the impact of the blast. At 12:31 a third and final warning call to the Palestine Post newspaper was made. The telephone operator called the Palestine Police CID to report the message. She then called the hotel switchboard. The hotel operator reported the threat to one of the hotel managers. This warning resulted in the discovery of the milk cans in the basement, but by then it was too late.

Begin claimed in his memoirs that the British had deliberately not evacuated, thereby creating a possible opportunity to vilify the Jewish militant groups.

=== Leaks and rumours ===
Shortly after noon Palestine time, the London UPI bureau received a short message stating that 'Jewish terrorists have just blown up the King David Hotel!'. The UPI stringer who had sent it, an Irgun member, had wanted to scoop his colleagues. Not knowing that the operation had been postponed by an hour, he sent the message before the operation had been completed. The bureau chief decided against running the story until more details and further confirmation had been obtained. There were other leaks.

== Execution ==
The perpetrators met at 7 am at the Beit Aharon Talmud Torah. This was the first time they were informed of the target. The attack used approximately 350 kg (770 lb) of explosives spread over six charges. According to Begin, due to "consultations" about the cancellation of the attack on the David Brothers Building, the operation was delayed and started at about 12:00, an hour later than planned.

After placing the bombs in the La Regence Cafe, the Irgun men quickly slipped out and detonated a small explosive in the street outside the hotel, reportedly to keep passers-by away from the area. The police report written in the aftermath of the bombing says that this explosion resulted in a higher death toll because it caused spectators from the hotel to gather in its south-west corner, directly over the bomb planted in its basement. The first explosion also caused the presence in the hotel of injured Arabs who were brought into the Secretariat after their bus, which had been passing, was rolled onto its side. The Arab workers in the kitchen fled after being told to do so.

There were two Irgun casualties, Avraham Abramovitz and Itzhak Tsadok. In one Irgun account of the bombing, by Katz, the two were shot during the initial approach to the hotel, when a minor gunfight ensued with two British soldiers who had become suspicious. In Yehuda Lapidot's account, the men were shot as they were withdrawing after the attack. The latter agrees with the version of events presented by Bethell and Thurston Clarke. According to Bethell, Abramovitz managed to get to the taxi getaway car along with six other men. Tsadok escaped with the other men on foot. Both were found by the police in the Jewish Old Quarter of Jerusalem the next day, with Abramovitz already dead from his wounds.

== Explosion and aftermath ==
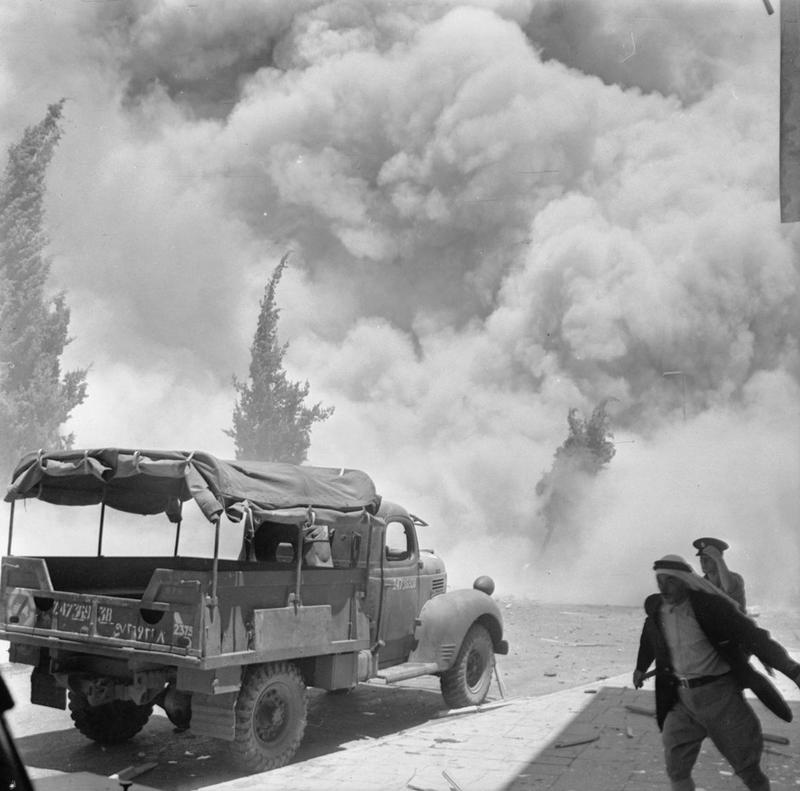
The explosion of a second bomb at the King David Hotel

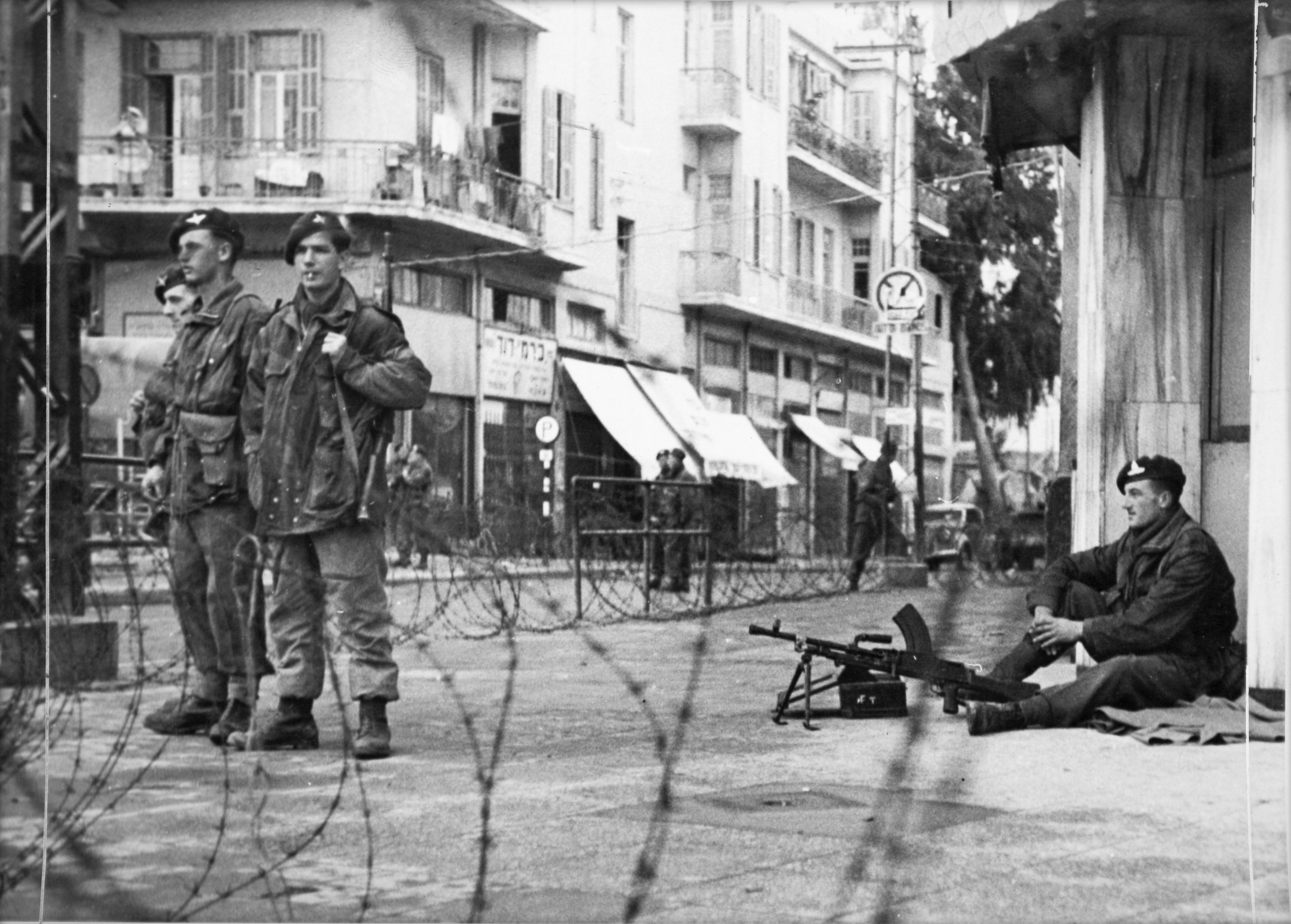
British paratroopers enforce curfew in Tel Aviv during Operation Shark after the King David Hotel bombing, July 1946. Photographer: Haim Fine, Russian Emmanuel collection, from collections of the National Library of Israel.

The explosion occurred at 12:37. It caused the collapse of the western half of the southern wing of the hotel. Soon after the explosion, rescuers from the Royal Engineers arrived with heavy lifting equipment. Later that night, the sappers were formed into three groups, with each working an eight-hour shift. The rescue operation lasted for the next three days and 2,000 lorry loads of rubble were removed. From the wreckage and rubble the rescuers managed to extract six survivors. The last to be found alive was Assistant Secretary Downing C. Thompson, 31 hours after the explosion, but he died just over a week later.

91 people were killed, most of them being staff of the hotel or Secretariat: 21 were first-rank government officials, including under-secretary Robert Paus Platt, the most senior official among the victims, and seven assistant secretaries; 49 were second-rank clerks, typists and messengers, junior members of the Secretariat, employees of the hotel and canteen workers; 13 were soldiers; three policemen; and five were bystanders. By nationality, there were 41 Arabs, 28 British citizens, 17 Jews, two Armenians, one Russian, one Greek and one Egyptian. Forty-nine people were injured. Some of the deaths and injuries occurred in the road outside the hotel and in adjacent buildings. The blast threw Postmaster General Gerald Kennedy from the hotel across the street onto a wall of the YMCA building opposite, from which his body had to be scraped off. No identifiable traces were found of thirteen of those killed. Among the dead were Yulius Jacobs, an Irgun sympathizer, and Edward Sperling, a Zionist writer and government official.

== Reactions ==
=== British reactions ===
The bombing inflamed public opinion in Britain. After the bombing, editorials in British newspapers argued that the bombing deflated statements by the government that it had been winning against the Jewish paramilitaries. The Manchester Guardian argued that "British firmness" inside Palestine had brought about more terrorism and worsened the situation in the country, the opposite effect that the government had intended.

Speaker after speaker in the House of Commons expressed outrage. Ex-Prime Minister Winston Churchill, a prominent and enthusiastic supporter of Zionism, criticized the attack. He also related the bombing to the problems within the Mandate system, and he advocated allowing further Jewish immigration into Palestine. Chief Secretary for the Government of Palestine, Sir John Shaw, noted that the majority of the dead had been members of his own personal staff: "British, Arabs, Jews, Greeks, Armenians; senior officers, police, my orderly, my chauffeur, messengers, guards, men and women—young and old—they were my friends."

British Prime Minister Clement Attlee commented in the House of Commons:

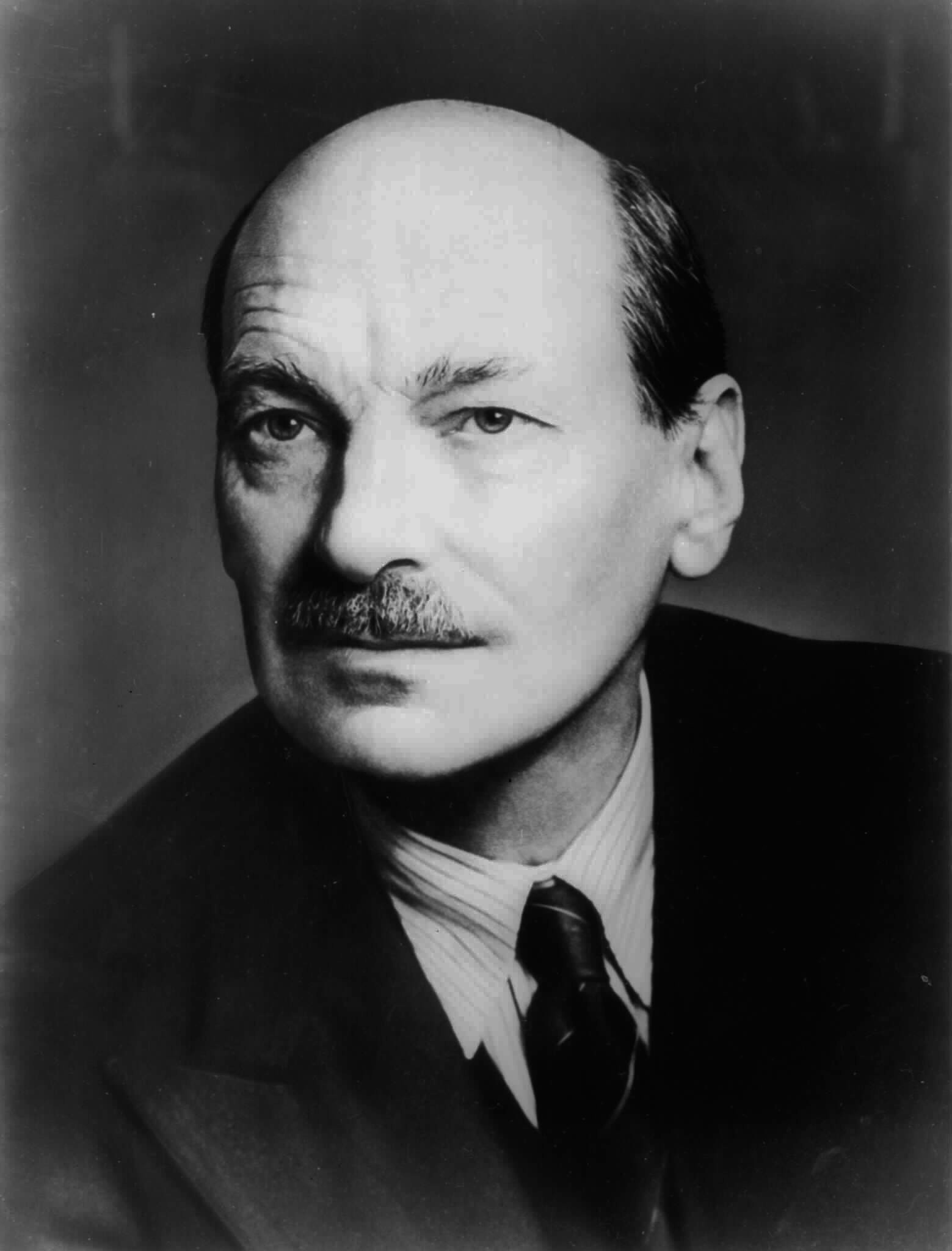
British premier Clement Attlee

Hon. Members will have learned with horror of the brutal and murderous crime committed yesterday in Jerusalem. Of all the outrages which have occurred in Palestine, and they have been many and horrible in the last few months, this is the worst. By this insane act of terrorism 93 innocent people have been killed or are missing in the ruins. The latest figures of casualties are 41 dead, 52 missing and 53 injured. I have no further information at present beyond what is contained in the following official report received from Jerusalem:

It appears that after exploding a small bomb in the street, presumably as a diversionary measure—this did virtually no damage—a lorry drove up to the tradesmen's entrance of the King David Hotel and the occupants, after holding up the staff at pistol point, entered the kitchen premises carrying a number of milk cans. At some stage of the proceedings, they shot and seriously wounded a British soldier who attempted to interfere with them. All available information so far is to the effect that they were Jews. Somewhere in the basement of the hotel they planted bombs which went off shortly afterwards. They appear to have made good their escape.

Every effort is being made to identify and arrest the perpetrators of this outrage. The work of rescue in the debris, which was immediately organised, still continues. The next-of-kin of casualties are being notified by telegram as soon as accurate information is available. The House will wish to express their profound sympathy with the relatives of the killed and with those injured in this dastardly outrage.

In a visit made sometime before the attack, Field Marshal Lord Montgomery, soon to become Chief of the Imperial General Staff (CIGS), the professional head of the British Army, had told Lieutenant General Sir Evelyn Barker, the General Officer Commanding (GOC) of the British Forces in Palestine and Trans-Jordan, to emphasise to the British servicemen that they were facing a cruel, fanatical and cunning enemy, and there was no way of knowing who was friend and who foe. Since there were female terrorists as well, according to Montgomery, all fraternising with the local population would have to cease. Within a few minutes of the bombing, Barker translated this instruction into an order that "all Jewish places of entertainment, cafes, restaurants, shops and private dwellings" be out of bounds to all ranks. He concluded: "I appreciate that these measures will inflict some hardship on the troops, but I am certain that if my reasons are fully explained to them, they will understand their propriety and they will be punishing the Jews in a way the race dislikes as much as any, by striking at their pockets and showing our contempt of them." The future Israeli diplomat Abba Eban, then an officer in the British Army, leaked the order to the press. Barker's wording was interpreted as antisemitic and caused much outrage and bad publicity for the British. Barker was nearly dismissed from his position over the scandal, and only Montgomery's threat to resign if Barker was sacked saved him his job.

In the aftermath of the attack, the Jewish neighborhoods of Jerusalem were placed under curfew for 16 days until 7 August. On 30 July, the British Army and Palestine Police launched Operation Shark, a cordon and search operation of the entire city of Tel Aviv and sections of Jaffa. The operation was carried out due to British military intelligence having incorrectly concluded that most or all of the bombers had come from Tel Aviv rather than Jerusalem. During the operation, the entire population was placed under curfew while buildings were searched and 102,000 people were screened, with hundreds arrested on suspicion of involvement in insurgent activity. Irgun leader Menachem Begin evaded the dragnet by hiding in a secret compartment of his home but Lehi leader Yitzhak Shamir was arrested and interned in Africa. Five arms caches were discovered during the operation. The British cabinet had also considered a massive arms search operation in Jewish settlements to disarm the Yishuv, imposing a collective fine of £500,000 on the Yishuv, and suspending legal Jewish immigration, but in the end decided to only approve the operation in Tel Aviv. The British cabinet also approved the release of a white paper titled Statement of Information Relating to Acts of Violence which presented evidence gathered by British intelligence that the Haganah was cooperating with the Irgun and Lehi and that this had the approval of the Jewish Agency leadership.

The attack did not change Britain's stance toward an Anglo-American agreement on Palestine, which was then in its concluding phase. In a letter dated 25 July 1946, Prime Minister Attlee wrote to American President Harry S. Truman: "I am sure you will agree that the inhuman crime committed in Jerusalem on 22 July calls for the strongest action against terrorism but having regard to the sufferings of the innocent Jewish victims of Nazism this should not deter us from introducing a policy designed to bring peace to Palestine with the least possible delay."

=== Israeli and Zionist reactions ===
The Jewish political leadership publicly condemned the attack. The Jewish Agency expressed "their feelings of horror at the base and unparalleled act perpetrated today by a gang of criminals". The Jewish National Council denounced the bombing. According to The Jerusalem Post, "although the Hagana had sanctioned the King David bombing, world-wide condemnation caused the organization to distance itself from the attack". David Ben-Gurion deemed the Irgun "the enemy of the Jewish people" after the attack. Hatsofeh, a Jewish newspaper in Palestine, labelled the Irgun perpetrators "fascists".

The Irgun issued an initial statement accepting responsibility for the attack, mourning their Jewish victims, and calling into fault the British for what they saw as a failure to respond to the warnings. A year later, on 22 July 1947, they issued a new statement saying that they were acting on instructions from "a letter from the headquarters of the United Resistance, demanding that we carry out an attack on the center of government at the King David Hotel as soon as possible". The Irgun's radio network announced that it would mourn for the Jewish victims, but not the British ones. This was explained by claiming that Britain had not mourned for the millions of Jews who died in the Nazi Holocaust. No remorse was expressed for the largest group of victims, the Arab dead.

Richard Crossman, a British Labour Party Member of Parliament (MP), whose experience on the Anglo-American Committee had made him sympathetic to Zionism, visited Chaim Weizmann shortly after the attack. Weizmann's ambivalence towards Zionist violence was apparent in the conversation. While condemning it, he also stated that he sympathised with its causes. When the King David Hotel bombing was mentioned, Weizmann started crying: "I can't help feeling proud of our boys. If only it had been a German headquarters, they would have gotten the Victoria Cross."

== Sir John Shaw controversy ==
At the time of the explosion, Chief Secretary, Sir John Shaw was in his office, which was in the eastern half of the south wing, rather than the destroyed western half. Jewish militant organisations sought to shift the blame to Shaw for the deaths.

Begin said that Shaw had been responsible for the failure to evacuate the hotel: "A police officer called Shaw and told him, 'The Jews say that they have placed bombs in the King David.' And the reply was, 'I am here to give orders to the Jews, not to take orders from them.'" The 1947 Irgun pamphlet Black Paper said that Shaw had forbidden anyone to leave the hotel: "For reasons best known to himself Shaw, the Chief Secretary of the Occupation administration, disregarded the warning. That is, he forbade any of the other officials to leave the building, with the result that some of his collaborators were killed, while he himself slunk away until after the explosion. ... Shaw thus sent nearly 100 people to their deaths—including Hebrews, including friends of our struggle." Begin said he had heard the information about Shaw from Israel Galili, Chief of Staff of Haganah, when they met on 23 July, the day after the bombing. In an interview with Bethell, Galili said his source for the Shaw story had been Boris Guriel, the future head of Israel's intelligence service, who had heard it in turn from the American Associated Press bureau chief Carter Davidson. Thurston Clarke interviewed both Galili and Guriel, the former in 1977. Guriel denied that he had been the source of the story. Galili was unable to produce any evidence that Shaw had received a warning. Carter Davidson died in 1958 and so could not be asked to confirm or deny what Galili had said. Clarke's assessment was that the story about Shaw was, in fact, "a baseless rumour promoted by the Haganah in order to mollify the Irgun and fix responsibility for the carnage on Shaw". Shmuel Katz, who had been a member of the Irgun's high command, later also wrote that "the story can be dismissed".

In 1948, a libel action was taken out by Shaw against a Jewish London newspaper which repeated the allegations made by Begin and the Irgun pamphlet. The newspaper did not mount a defence and made an unreserved apology to Shaw. About the allegation that he had said that he did not take orders from Jews, Shaw said: "I would never have made a statement like that and I don't think that anyone who knows me would regard it as in character. I would never have referred to the Jews in that way".

Also in 1948, William Ziff, an American author, released a revised edition of his 1938 book The Rape of Palestine which contained an embellished version of Galili's story, similar to the one given in the Black Paper pamphlet. It said that Shaw had escaped from the hotel minutes before the main explosion, abandoning its other occupants to their fate. Shaw took out another libel action against Ziff and his British publisher. After lawyers in Israel failed to find evidence supporting Ziff's version of events, the book's publishers withdrew it from circulation and apologised to Shaw.

The Revolt, Menachem Begin's book on the Irgun, which was published in Britain in 1951, made references to a "high official" having received a warning but refusing to evacuate the hotel in time. Shaw, believing this to be a reference to himself, considered suing Begin and his British publisher for libel and consulted with his personal attorney, but was advised against it, on grounds that a reference to a "high official" was insufficient to justify a claim of personal defamation. He instead wrote a letter to the publisher denying the book's version of events.

Bethell says that all of the British witnesses who were in the vicinity of the hotel at the time of the explosion confirmed what Shaw said. None of them had any knowledge of a warning having been sent in time to make evacuation of the hotel possible. They said that, like themselves, Shaw had not known about the bomb beforehand and that he bore no responsibility for putting colleagues' lives at risk immediately before the explosion. The only criticism made was that Shaw should have closed the Régence restaurant and put guards on the service entrance weeks before. Shaw agreed that not having done this was a mistake. The decision not to do it had been made because "everyone was under orders to preserve the semblance of normality in Palestine", "social life had to be allowed to continue" and because nobody had believed that the Irgun would put the whole of the Secretariat, which had many Jewish employees, in danger.

Two months after the bombing, Shaw was appointed High Commissioner of Trinidad and Tobago. The Irgun immediately sent a letter bomb to him there, but it was intercepted and successfully disarmed.

== Legacy and later reports ==
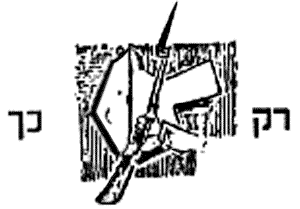
Irgun emblem with Hebrew symbols used during its armed campaign

=== Locally ===
The attack significantly escalated the conflict between Jewish militants and the Mandate government. Early on 30 July 1946, in an effort to capture wanted underground members, Operation Shark was launched in Tel Aviv. Four army brigades, comprising about twenty thousand soldiers and police, established a cordon around the city. A historian later described the situation as "looking for a few needles of militants in a haystack 170,000 people deep." Nearly eight hundred individuals were detained and subsequently sent to the Rafah detention camp.

The attack prompted the British government to impose widely unpopular restrictions on the civil liberties of Jews in Palestine. These measures included random personal searches, random searches of homes, military curfews, roadblocks, and mass arrests. The actions further eroded British public support for the Mandate system and alienated the Jewish populace, aligning with Begin's original intent.

Following the bombing, the Irgun and Lehi intensified their campaign, carrying out a series of attacks. According to The Jerusalem Post, the bombing marked the end of the united front between the Irgun and other Zionist groups, such as the Haganah. From that point forward, their relationships became more adversarial. Irgun ex-members and sympathizers argue that modern historical accounts in Israel are biased in favor of more established groups like the Haganah.

After the bombing, the hotel complex continued to be used by the British until 4 May 1948. It later served as an Israeli headquarters from the end of the 1947–1949 Palestine war until the Six-Day War. Subsequently, the Israelis reopened the hotel for commercial purposes, and in recent years, it has hosted visiting dignitaries and celebrities.

=== Terrorism ===
The bombing has been discussed in literature about the practice and history of terrorism. It has been called one of the most lethal terrorist attacks of the 20th century.

Security analyst Bruce Hoffman wrote of the bombing in his 1999 book Inside Terrorism: "Unlike many terrorist groups today, the Irgun's strategy was not deliberately to target or wantonly harm civilians. At the same time, though, the claim of Begin and other apologists that warnings were issued cannot absolve either the group or its commander for the ninety-one people killed and forty-five others injured ... Indeed, whatever nonlethal intentions the Irgun might or might not have had, the fact remains that a tragedy of almost unparalleled magnitude was inflicted ... so that to this day the bombing remains one of the world's single most lethal terrorist incidents of the twentieth century."

Walter Enders and Todd Sandler theorized in a 2006 book on the political economy of terrorism that it provided a model for the terrorist bombings of the 1980s. In another 2006 book, Gus Martin wrote that the attack is one of the best historical examples of successful terrorism, it having yielded, according to him, everything that the Irgun had wanted. He went on to compare the aftermath of the bombing to that of Carlos Marighella's campaign with the Brazilian Communist Party. Max Abrahms contests the view that the civilian deaths in the King David Hotel expedited British withdrawal from Palestine, stating that the widespread public backlash—including from Jews—combined with a British crackdown "nearly destroyed the Irgun" and "is thus hardly a strong example of terrorism paying".

The Irgun's activities were classed as terrorism by MI5. The Irgun has been viewed as a terrorist organization or organization which carried out terrorist acts. In particular the Irgun was branded a terrorist organisation by Britain, the 1946 Zionist Congress and the Jewish Agency. Begin argued that terrorists and freedom fighters are differentiated in that terrorists deliberately try to target civilians, and that the Irgun was not guilty of terrorism since it tried to avoid civilian casualties. At the events to mark the 60th anniversary of the attack, Benjamin Netanyahu, then chairman of Likud and Leader of the Opposition in the Knesset, opined that the bombing was a legitimate act with a military target, distinguishing it from an act of terror intended to harm civilians.

=== Army and police reports ===
Various British government papers relating to the bombing were released under the thirty year rule in 1978, including the results of the military and police investigations. (Note: A copy of the police report (identifying code 'CO 537 2290') is held at the Public Record Office, London.) The reports contain statements and conclusions contradicted by other evidence, including that submitted to the inquest held after the bombing. Affidavits reflecting badly on the security of the hotel were removed from the army report before it was submitted to the High Commissioner and then the Cabinet in London.

The police report makes the claim that the warning sent to the French Consulate was received five minutes after the main explosion. This is contradicted by multiple eyewitnesses who reported seeing staff opening the Consulate windows five minutes before it. The report also claims that the warning received by the Palestine Post was not received until after the explosion. That claim is supported in the report by the testimony of two members of the Palestine Post staff, one of whom said that she was put under pressure by the Palestine Police to withdraw her statements she had made in her account.

=== 60th anniversary controversy ===
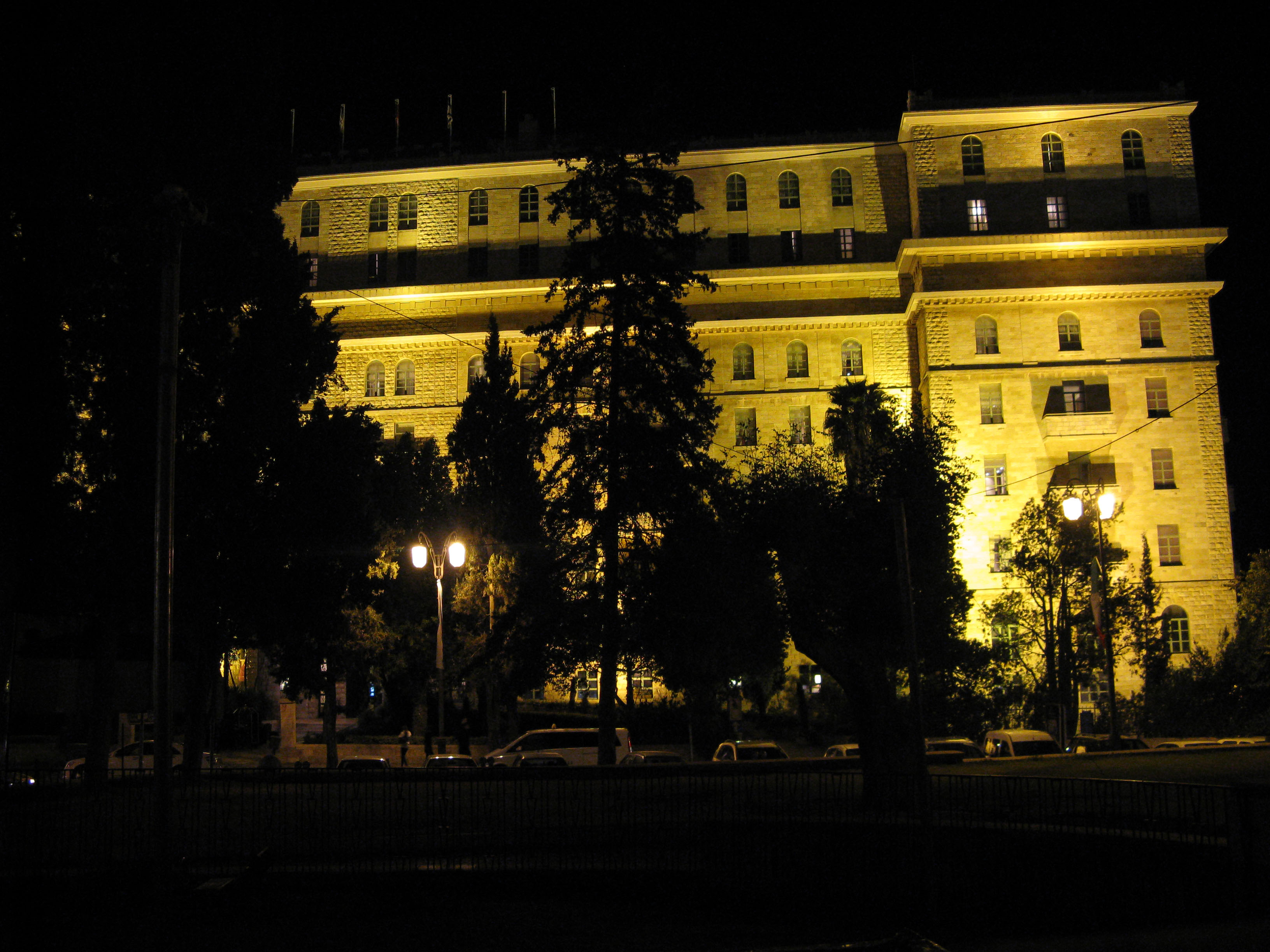
The hotel in 2008

In July 2006, the Menachem Begin Heritage Center organized a conference to mark the 60th anniversary of the bombing. The conference was attended by past and future Prime Minister Benjamin Netanyahu and former members of Irgun. A plaque commemorating the bombing reads: "For reasons known only to the British, the hotel was not evacuated." The British Ambassador in Tel Aviv and the Consul-General in Jerusalem protested, saying "We do not think that it is right for an act of terrorism, which led to the loss of many lives, to be commemorated", and wrote to the Mayor of Jerusalem that such an act of terror could not be honoured, even if it was preceded by a warning. The British government also demanded the removal of the plaque, stating that the statement accusing the British of failing to evacuate the hotel was untrue and "did not absolve those who planted the bomb".

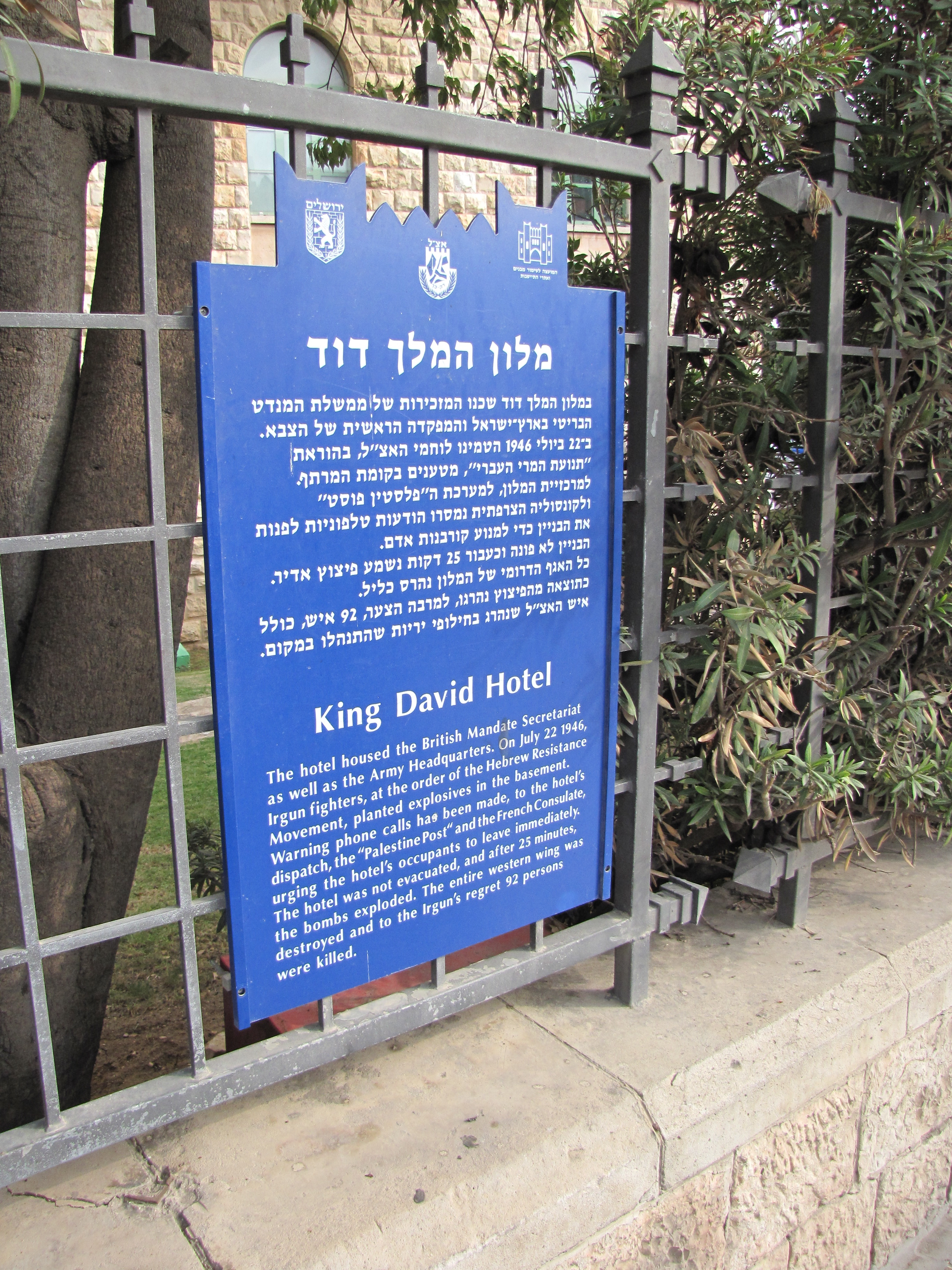
The plaque of the King David Hotel. The Hebrew version has an additional line saying that among the 92 people killed was an Irgun member shot dead.

To prevent a diplomatic incident, and over the objections of Knesset member Reuven Rivlin (Likud), who raised the matter in the Knesset, changes were made in the plaque's text, though to a greater degree in English than the Hebrew version. The final English version reads: "Warning phone calls has [sic] been made to the hotel, The Palestine Post and the French Consulate, urging the hotel's occupants to leave immediately. The hotel was not evacuated and after 25 minutes the bombs exploded. To the Irgun's regret, 92 persons were killed." The death toll given includes Avraham Abramovitz, the Irgun member who was shot during the attack and died later from his wounds, but only the Hebrew version of the sign makes that clear. The Hebrew version has words which translate as "including an Irgun man who was killed in a shootout which happened there" (Hebrew: כולל איש האצ"ל שנהרג בחילופי יריות שהתנהלו במקום) at the end.

== See also ==
- Violence in the Israeli–Palestinian conflict
- Zionist political violence

== In media ==
- Exodus (1960), Hollywood film with Paul Newman, directed by Otto Preminger
- The Promise (2001), a British television serial in four episodes written and directed by Peter Kosminsky
- In the Name of Liberation: Freedom by Any Means, one of the documentaries from the series The Age of Terror: A Survey of modern terrorism (2002) produced by Films Media Group
- Early Israeli Terrorism (2009), a BBC documentary
- Footage of the bombed hotel collapsing opens episode 2 of Foyle's War series eight (11 January 2015)
- "Last Night We Attacked: A Photographic Record of Fighting Resistance in Palestine" (1947), 35 mm film prepared by the American League for a Free Palestine, edited by Elizabeth Wheeler, written by Larry Ravitz, narrated by Quentin Reynolds & Bill Parker, copyright 2010 NCJF.
