= Bracha Habas =

Lithuanian and Israeli Journalist, literary editor and writer (1900–1968)

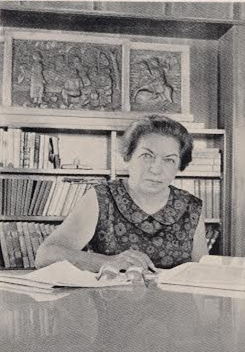
Habas in the 1960s

Bracha Habas (Hebrew: ברכה חבס; 20 January 1900 – 31 July 1968) was a Lithuanian and Israeli journalist, literary editor, and writer. She is being considered as “one of the first professional women journalists in Israel.”

== Early life and education ==
Born on 20 January 1900 in Alytus, southern Lithuania, Bracha Habas moved to Palestine with her family in 1906. After the completion of her school education, she enrolled at the Training Seminary for Women Teachers where she graduated in 1921.

In 1919, she joined the socialist-Zionist party, Ahdut HaAvoda through which she started empowering the young working women. In 1926, she went to Germany to enroll at Leipzig University to advance her knowledge of pedagogical theory. On her return, she worked with the schools that were associated with Women Teachers’ Seminary.

== Career ==
She later began her professional career in journalism. She periodically wrote editorials, stories and reports in a number of leading newspapers. She also served on the editorial board of the newspaper Davar and of the Am Oved, a books publishing house. She was also sent to the Zionist Congress, Zürich as its correspondent by the Davar newspaper. She briefly worked in educating the rural youths.

== Personal life ==
In 1946, she married David Hacohen, an Israeli politician and diplomat.

She died of cancer on 31 July 1968.

== Selected works ==
Sources:

- Ḥomah u-Migdal (1939)
- Korot Ma'pil Ẓa'ir (1942)
- David Ben-Gurion ve-Doro (1952)
- Pagodot ha-Zahav (1959)
- Benot Ḥayil (1964)
- Ḥayyav u-Moto shel Joop Westerweel (1964)
- Tenu'ah le-Lo Shem (1965)
- He-Ḥaẓer ve-ha-Givah (1968)
