= Edward Sperling =

Belarusian-born writer, humorist and Zionist (1889-1946)

Edward J Sperling
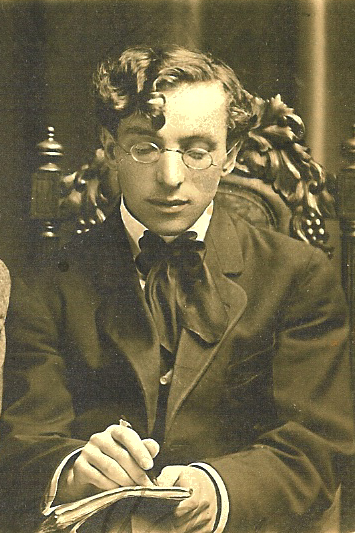
- A young Edward Sperling, 1911
- Born: Ezra Sperling; 1889; Slutsk, Belarus
- Died: 22 July 1946 (aged 56–57); Jerusalem, Mandatory Palestine
- Cause of death: King David Hotel bombing
- Resting place: Mount of Olives, Jerusalem
- Occupations: Writer, humourist
- Known for: Articles for local Jewish newspapers, Director-general of the Ministry of Trade and Industry in the British Mandate
- Notable work: "Barrage" articles
- Spouse: Sara Fixman
- Children: 4, including Joseph Trumpeldor Sperling

Edward J Sperling (1889 – July 22, 1946), born Ezra Sperling, was a 20th-century writer, humourist, and Zionist.

== Early life ==
Ezra Sperling was born in 1889 in a Jewish community in Slutsk, Belarus, then part of the Russian Empire. As a boy, he and his family fled Russia to avoid the state-sponsored pogroms, emigrating to the United States, where he changed his name to Edward. His family eventually settled in Sioux City, Iowa. As a boy – and throughout his life – Edward was described as quiet, gentle, and fairly introverted, spending most of his time reading or writing. As a result, he took to writing professionally, writing articles for local Jewish newspapers.

== World War One and aftermath ==
After World War I had broken out, Edward went to Canada to join the British Army in 1918, and ended up enlisting in the Jewish Legion under Joseph Trumpeldor, for whom he would later name his first-born son, Joseph Trumpeldor Sperling (though this was also because Edward's future wife had been friends with Trumpeldor). It is unclear whether Sperling was a zionist before joining the Jewish Legion, or if his experiences under Zionists such as Trumpeldor influenced him to that end, but it is certain that by the time the war was over, he believed very strongly in the Zionist cause. After his discharge from the Jewish Legion, he settled in Palestine, where he married a fellow Russian émigré named Sara Fixman, with whom he had 4 children. He befriended many prominent Zionists, among them future president Yitzhak Ben-Zvi, The Palestine Post/The Jerusalem Post founder Gershon Agron, and future prime minister Moshe Shertok. At the request of the Jewish Agency, Edward began working for the British Mandate, rising to the post of director-general of the Ministry of Trade and Industry. He used this post to aid the development of Jewish industries and the kibbutzim.

== Writings ==
While working for the British Mandate, Edward wrote for many newspapers, including the London Jewish Chronicle and the Palestine Illustrated News, often under pseudonyms (most notably "Caisson"). His most successful article, which he wrote for the Illustrated News, was entitled "Barrage". Barrage, which was essentially a collection of humorous aphorisms/one-liners, ran from 1937 to April 1946. The humour expressed is often based on the inconveniences of Palestinian (and later, war-time) life.

Excerpts from Barrage:

- "It is feared that the high cost of hair dyes may cause a serious shortage of blondes in the country."
- "Military experts, once skeptical, now give great praise to the Soviet Army. Those Russians have shown that they can take towns faster than anybody else can pronounce them".
- "It is feared that should the python, which escaped the other day from the Tel Aviv Zoo, begin to devour camels, the city will be threatened with a serious meat shortage".

In 1992, Sperling's grandson, David Sperling, compiled a great number of the aphorisms into a book entitled Barrage: Observations from Palestine, 1940 – 1946, which remains as yet unpublished.

Sperling also wrote art criticisms for the Jewish Chronicle and the Palestine Post (the latter which published his last review on the day of his death), using the initials "Th. F.M.".

== Death ==
On July 22, 1946, Edward Sperling died in the King David Hotel bombing. Sperling was preparing to leave Jerusalem to go to Haifa. As he left his government office at the King David Hotel, he was shot at by Irgun men (not knowing he himself was a Zionist). Wounded, he fled back into his office in the hotel. Shortly afterward, the bombs planted by the Irgun men in the hotel went off. He was among the 91 people killed in the bombing. He was buried on the Mount of Olives in Jerusalem. (See King David Hotel bombing).
