= Robert Paus Platt =

British diplomat

Robert Paus Platt OBE

Under-Secretary, Government of Mandatory Palestine

Personal details
- Born: 1905 England
- Died: 22 July 1946 (aged 40–41) Jerusalem, Mandatory Palestine
- Cause of death: King David Hotel bombing
- Resting place: Jerusalem
- Spouse: Joan Rosa Lumley
- Parent(s): Robert M. Platt, Ellen Sophie Paus
- Education: Queens' College, Cambridge
- Occupation: Diplomat, colonial administrator
- Known for: One of the highest-ranking British officials killed in the King David Hotel bombing
- Awards: Officer of the Order of the British Empire

Robert Paus Platt OBE (born 1905 in England, died 22 July 1946 in Jerusalem) was a British diplomat and colonial administrator. He served as undersecretary in the mandatory government of the British Mandate of Palestine. As the deputy of the chief secretary he was one of the highest-ranking government officials in Mandatory Palestine, after the chief secretary and the high commissioner. He was among the 91 victims of the King David Hotel bombing, along with seven of his assistant secretaries. He was the highest-ranking British official to be killed in the attack. Prior to his work in Palestine he had been an assistant secretary (divisional manager) at the Colonial Office in London and served for eleven years in the administration of the Kenya Colony, including as assistant colonial secretary.

== Career ==
Platt studied at Queens' College, Cambridge. He joined the Colonial Administrative Service as a cadet in 1927, serving in Kenya until 1938. He was appointed assistant resident commissioner in Mombasa in 1928 and became a district officer in 1929. As of 1936 he was assistant colonial secretary in Kenya, serving under colonial secretary and acting governor Armigel Wade. In 1938 he returned to London to become assistant secretary in the Colonial Office. He later became undersecretary in the mandatory government of the British Mandate of Palestine and was killed in the King David Hotel bombing. He was the most senior British official to be killed, among the 91 victims of the attack. He was interred in Jerusalem.

== Background ==
Platt was the son of Robert M. Platt and Ellen Sophie Paus, who married in 1904. His mother was a member of the noted Paus family of Norway. His maternal grandfather Christopher Paus, who was a first cousin of Henrik Ibsen, was a Norwegian-born businessman who moved to England. His other three grandparents were English. He was a nephew of the British Consul in Oslo, Christopher Lintrup Paus.

He was married to Joan Rosa Lumley, a daughter of James Maddy Lumley, a British colonial administrator in Africa who was Commissioner of Police in Kenya.

== Honours ==
- Officer of the Order of the British Empire (OBE)
