= Statement of Information Relating to Acts of Violence =

- The report; cmd 6873
- Created: July 1946
- Purpose: To provide information on the Jewish insurgency in Mandatory Palestine

The Statement of Information Relating to Acts of Violence was a White Paper published by the British Government on 24 July 1946. It was published as a request of the Prime Minister following the British Operation Agatha on 29 June 1946. Although it was published two days after the King David hotel bombing, it had been prepared prior to that event.

The paper set out details of the Jewish insurgency in Mandatory Palestine, including evidence that the Jewish Agency had been complicit with the terrorist groups. A telegram had been intercepted, including codenames, one of which "Hayyim" was understood to be Chaim Weizmann.
