= Operation Agatha =

1946 British military operation against Jewish paramilitaries in Mandatory Palestine

- Part of the Jewish insurgency in Palestine
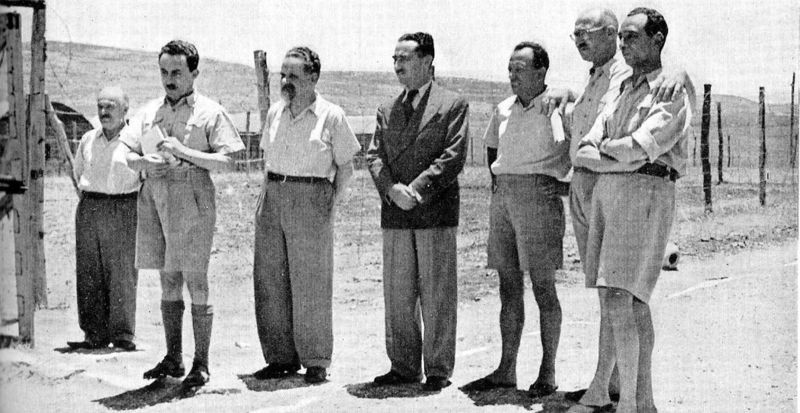
- Zionist leaders in Latrun, following the operation. Left to right: David Remez, Moshe Sharett, Yitzhak Gruenbaum, Dov Yosef, David Shenkarsky, David Hacohen, Chaim Halperin.
- Operational scope: Operational
- Planned by: British Mandate authorities
- Objective: Arrest Zionist underground members
- Date: Saturday, June 29, 1946
- Outcome: Success

Operation Agatha (Saturday, June 29, 1946), sometimes called Black Sabbath (Hebrew: השבת השחורה) or Black Saturday because it began on the Jewish sabbath, was a police and military operation conducted by the British authorities in Mandatory Palestine during the Jewish insurgency. Soldiers and police searched for arms and made arrests in Jerusalem, Tel Aviv, Haifa and several dozen settlements; the Jewish Agency was raided. The total number of British security forces personnel involved is variously reported as 10,000, 17,000, and 25,000. About 2,700 individuals were arrested, among them future Israeli Prime Minister Moshe Sharett. The officially given purpose of the operation was to end "the state of anarchy" then existing in Palestine. Other objectives included obtaining documentary proof of Jewish Agency approval of sabotage operations by the Palmach and of an alliance between the Haganah and the more violent Lehi (Stern Gang) and Irgun, destroying the Haganah's military power, boosting army morale and preventing a coup d'état being mounted by the Lehi and Irgun.

== Background ==
On June 16, 1946, the "Night of the Bridges" saw the Palmach blow up eight road and rail bridges linking Palestine to neighbouring countries. On June 17, the Lehi attacked railway workshops in Haifa. Two days later, the Irgun kidnapped six British officers. One officer subsequently escaped, and two were released. The Irgun announced that the remaining officers would be released only in exchange for the commutation of death sentences for two Irgun members.

The British Army had for months wanted to take military action against the Zionist underground organizations, but it had been blocked by High Commissioner Alan Cunningham, who was also particularly opposed to military action being taken against the Jewish Agency. Cunningham changed his mind after the "Night of the Bridges" and flew to London to meet the British Cabinet and army chief Field Marshal Bernard Montgomery in London. Montgomery formulated the plan for Operation Agatha. With reluctance, Cunningham accepted it in the hope that with the more militant Zionists restrained, the way would be open to reaching a political settlement with the more moderate and pro-British leaders such as Chaim Weizmann. During the operation, a radio broadcast had Cunningham say, "[The arrests] are not directed against the Jewish community as a whole but solely against those few who are taking an active part in the present campaign of violence and those who are responsible for instigating and directing it..."

The Chief of the Secretariat, Sir John Shaw, outlined the official objective of the operation at a press conference in Jerusalem: "Large-scale operations have been authorized to end the state of anarchy existing in Palestine and to enable law-abiding citizens to pursue their normal occupations without fear of kidnapping, murder, or being blown up". Shaw believed that the British should end the existing situation by partitioning Palestine into Jewish and Arab states and then leaving or by dismantling the Jewish Agency, which claimed administrative authority but secretly supported acts by the underground Zionist military organizations and governed without the authority. Thus, Shaw approved of the operation.

Several other objectives underlay the official one such as to obtain documentary proof of the Jewish Agency's approval of sabotage operations by the Palmach and an alliance between the Haganah and the more violent Lehi (Stern Gang) and Irgun in carrying out violent acts. Another was to forestall a coup d'etat. In June, members of the Jewish Agency's Executive and the Haganah High Command had met with delegates of the Irgun and Lehi at which the latter, according to intelligence, had stated its intention of asking the Yishuv to participate in a coup "for the proclamation of a future Jewish State and the interruption of all relations with the existing Palestine Administration". In the wake of the "Night of the Bridges", another objective was to break the military power of the Haganah. Since the Haganah had appeared to be acting in co-operation with the Lehi and Irgun, the British authorities believed mistakenly that breaking its military power was also necessary because the Haganah might co-operate with the prospective Irgun and Lehi coup. Lastly, Montgomery had stated that the operation was required to boost army morale.

Another objective which motivated the British to carry out the operation was proving French-Zionist cooperation against the British. During the operation, the files of Eliyahu Sasson were confiscated and searched but none proved the connection. Two months prior to the operation, the details of it were leaked to the Jewish Agency by Jamil Mardam, who operated as an agent for French intelligence.

== Operation ==
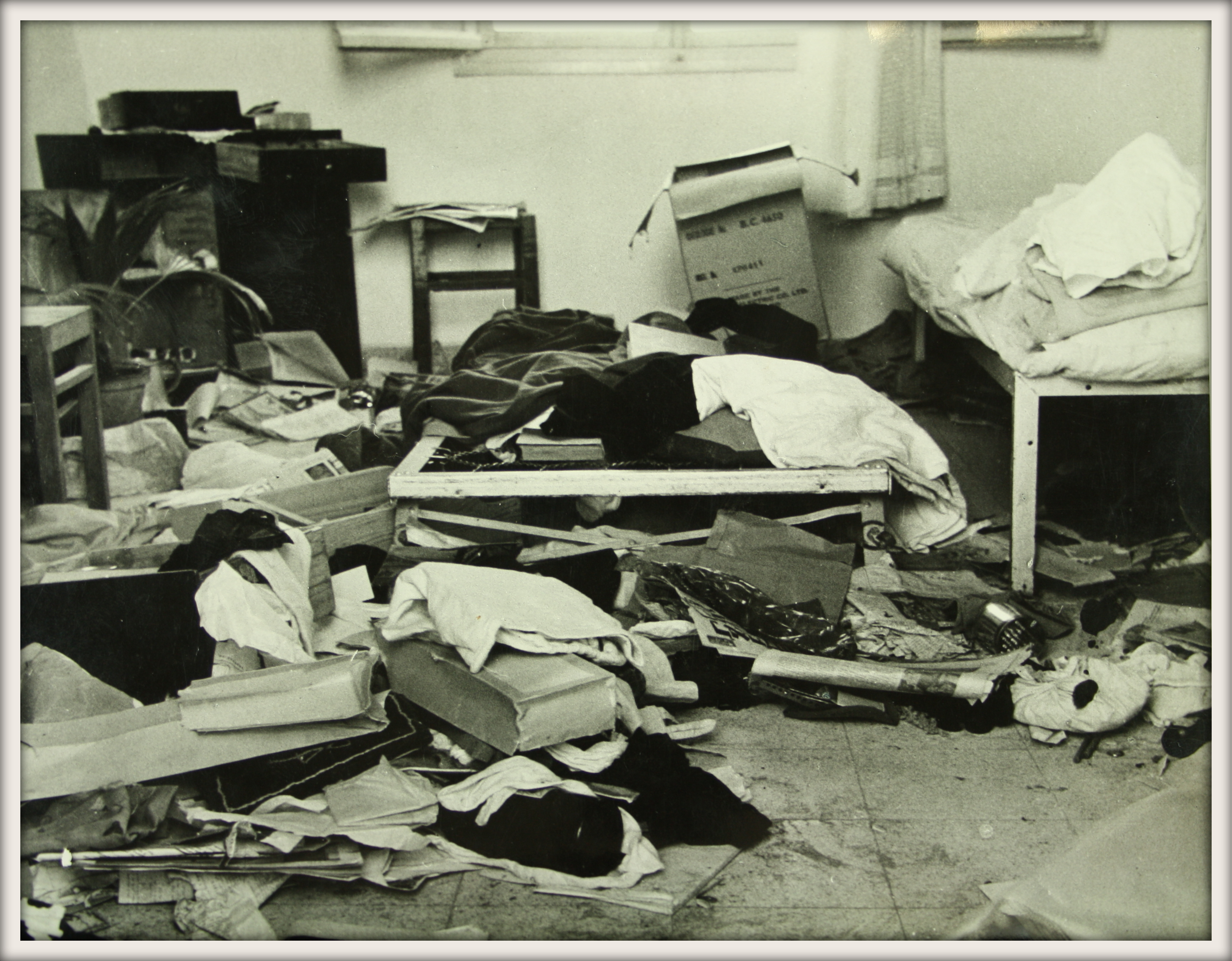
A room in Kibbutz Yagur after a weapon search was conducted during Operation Agatha. From the collections of the National Library of Israel.

On June 29, Operation Agatha began; it lasted until July 1. Curfews were imposed throughout Palestine, low-flying planes circled Jerusalem, roadblocks were put up, trains were flagged down and passengers were evacuated and escorted home. Special licenses were required for the operations of emergency vehicles. British troops and police raided the Jewish Agency headquarters in Jerusalem, the Jewish Agency office in Tel Aviv and other Jewish institutions such as the Women's International Zionist Organization and the Histadrut. A total of 27 Jewish settlements in Palestine were searched, and the residents of these settlements sometimes put up fierce resistance. Four Jews were killed resisting British searches. Mass arrests of Jewish leaders and Haganah members were carried out. A total of 2,718 people were arrested, including four members of the Jewish Agency Executive, seven Haganah officers, and nearly half of the Palmach's fighting force. However, a Haganah intelligence warning allowed most Haganah commanders to evade arrest. David Ben-Gurion was not arrested as he was in Paris at the time.

Searches of Jewish settlements uncovered 15 arms caches, including one of the Haganah's three central arsenals at Kibbutz Yagur, where 325 rifles, 425,000 bullets, 96 2-inch mortars, 5,200 mortar shells, 5,000 grenades and 78 revolvers were confiscated. The arms were displayed at a press conference, and all of the men of Yagur were arrested.

The searches were resisted by large swathes of the Jewish population, many of whom were Holocaust survivors. Roadblocks were constructed and British troops were attacked while conducting searches. Some Jews conducted lie-ins to prevent the movement of military trucks, and others publicly displayed their concentration camp tattoos to the British in order to try to elicit their sympathy. A few British soldiers exacerbated the tense atmosphere by shouting "Heil Hitler" and scrawling swastikas on walls while they conducted searches.

== Aftermath ==
British Government Statement of Information Relating to Acts of Violence, including a summary of information gained from Operation Agatha.

After Agatha ended, the kidnapped British officers were released, and High Commissioner Alan Cunningham commuted the Irgun members' death sentences to life imprisonment.

The Haganah and Palmach were dissuaded from continued anti-British operations. However, the more extreme groups, the Lehi (Stern Gang) and the Irgun Tzvai Leumi, headed by future Prime Minister Menachem Begin, continued and even intensified their attacks.

Specifically, the Irgun retaliated for Operation Agatha by bombing the south wing of the King David Hotel, which was the headquarters of the British government in Palestine. One reason for bombing the south wing was that it was presumed to be the place to which the British had taken the documents from the Jewish Agency.
