= David Hacohen =

Israeli politician (1898–1984)

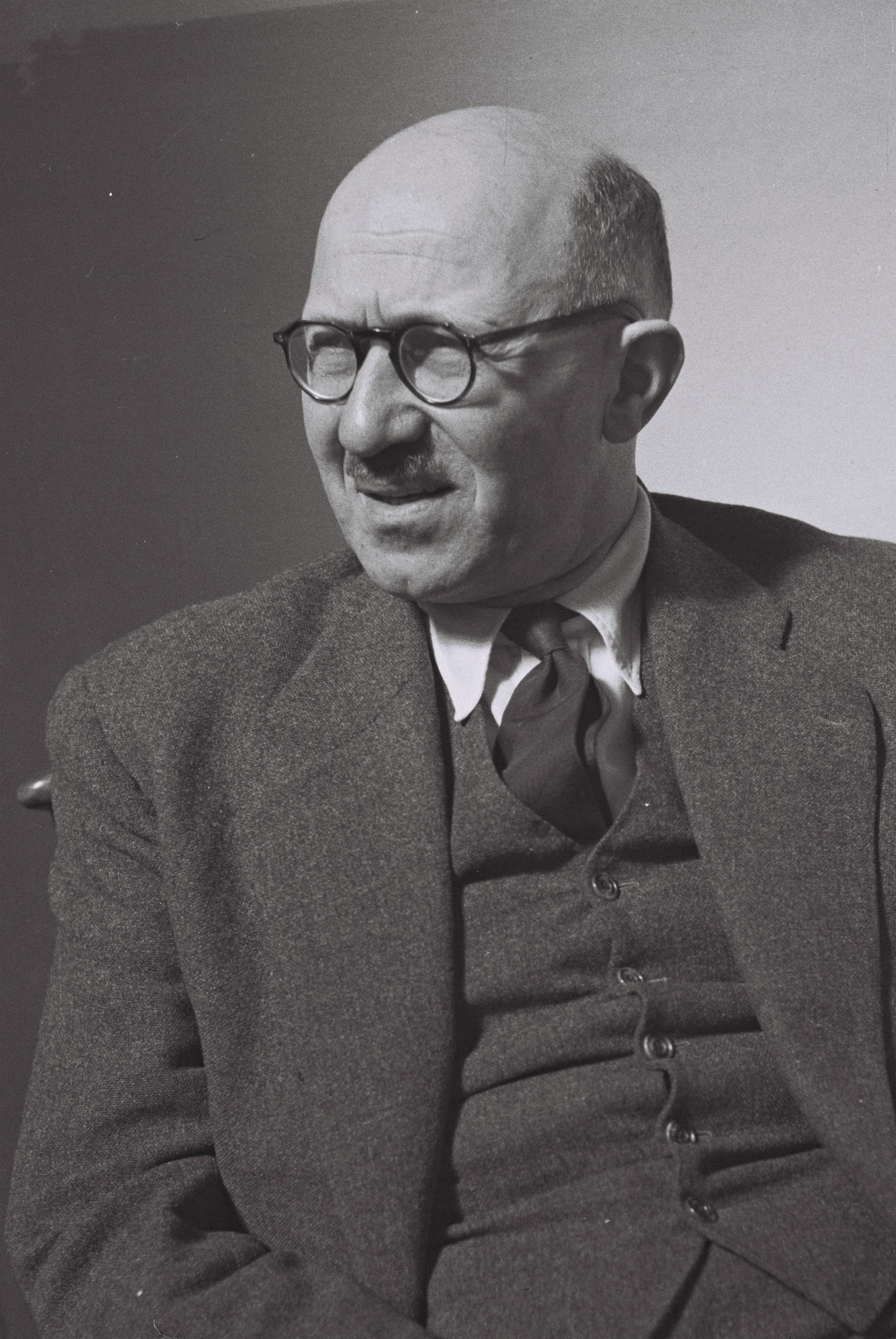
- Hacohen in 1949

Faction represented in the Knesset
- 1949–1965: Mapai
- 1965–1968: Alignment
- 1968–1969: Labor Party
- 1969: Alignment

Personal details
- Born: 20 October 1898 Gomel, Russian Empire
- Died: 19 February 1984 (aged 85)

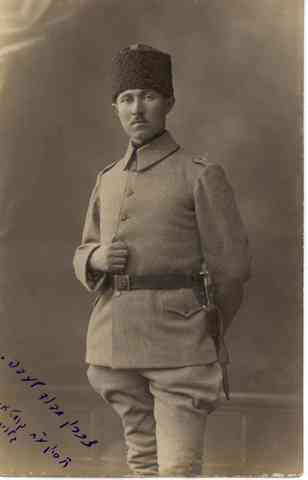
Hacohen while serving as a first lieutenant'in the Ottoman Army in 1918

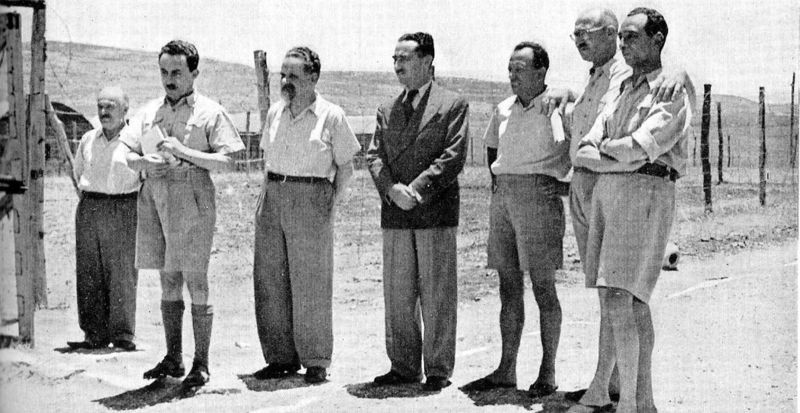
Zionist leaders, arrested in Operation Agatha, in detention in Latrun (l-r): David Remez, Moshe Sharett, Yitzhak Gruenbaum, Dov Yosef, Mr. Shenkarsky, David Hacohen, and Mr. Halperin (Isser Harel) (1946)

David Hacohen (Hebrew: דָּוִד הַכֹּהֵן; 20 October 1898 – 19 February 1984) was an Israeli politician who served as a member of the Knesset between 1949 and 1953, and again from 1955 until 1969. He fought with the Ottoman Army in World War I. After the war he studied law and economics in London, then returned to Mandatory Palestine in the 1920s. He was a member of Haganah and served with the British in World War II. He was arrested by the British in Operation Agatha.

== Biography ==
Hacohen was born in Gomel in the Russian Empire (today in Belarus). He studied at a local heder, before his family immigrated to Ottoman-controlled Palestine in 1907. He then attended Herzliya Hebrew High School. In 1916 he joined the Ottoman Army and fought in World War I. Following the war, he studied law and economics in London between 1919 and 1923.

After returning to Palestine he became Director of the Office of Public Works and Planning, which later became a company under the name Solel Boneh. He also became a member of the Haganah, which operated an underground radio station from his home in Haifa, and was elected to Haifa City Council. During World War II he was an officer in the British Army, serving as a liaison between the British Army and the Haganah. However, following the war he was arrested by the British authorities during Operation Agatha in 1946 and imprisoned. In the same year he married the writer Bracha Habas.

In 1949 Hacohen was elected to the first Knesset on the Mapai list. He was re-elected in 1951 elections but resigned from the Knesset on 1 December 1953 after he was appointed Israeli ambassador to Burma, a post he held until 1955. That year he was returned to the Knesset on the Mapai list and was subsequently re-elected in 1959, 1961 and 1965, by which time Mapai had formed the Alignment alliance with Ahdut HaAvoda, serving until the 1969 elections. During his time as an MK, he was a delegate to the Inter-Parliamentary Union and served on its executive board.

Hacohen died in 1984 at the age of 85.
