= Ronald Penney =

British Army general (1896–1964)

Major-General Sir Ronald Penney KBE CB DSO MC
- Born: 16 May 1896; Midlothian, Scotland
- Died: 3 December 1964 (aged 68); Berwick-upon-Tweed, Northumberland, England
- Military career
- Allegiance: United Kingdom
- Branch: British Army
- Service years: 1914–1949
- Rank: Major-General
- Nicknames: "Bunny" "Ronny"
- Service number: 3029
- Units: Royal Engineers; Royal Corps of Signals
- Commands: 1st Infantry Division (1943–1944); 3rd Infantry Brigade (1940–1941)
- Conflicts: First World War; Waziristan campaign Second World War
- Awards: Knight Commander of the Order of the British Empire; Companion of the Order of the Bath; Distinguished Service Order; Military Cross; Mentioned in Despatches (2); Croix de guerre (France); Croix de guerre (Belgium); Legion of Merit (United States); Commander of the Order of the White Lion (Czechoslovak)

Major-General Sir William Ronald Campbell Penney, KBE, CB, DSO, MC (16 May 1896 – 3 December 1964) was a British Army officer who fought in both the First and the Second World Wars. His most notable role occurred during the latter, when he was General Officer Commanding (GOC) of the 1st Infantry Division during the Battle of Anzio, part of the Italian Campaign, in 1944.

== Early life and military career ==
Born in Midlothian on 16 May 1896, Penney was the third of four sons of Joseph Campbell Penney, an Edinburgh accountant, and Margaret Eleanor Jane Gourlay. He was educated at Wellington College, Berkshire and, with the intention of starting a military career, the Royal Military Academy, Woolwich.

Penney was still at the academy at the outbreak of the First World War in August 1914, from where he graduated and was commissioned as a second lieutenant into the Royal Engineers on 17 November. Promoted to lieutenant on 23 December 1915, he was initially held back in the United Kingdom, but from 24 January 1916, he fought on the Western Front. He was promoted to the acting rank of captain on 22 January 1917 and made second-in-command (2IC) of a signals company, and his rank of captain was made permanent on 3 November of that year.

When the war came to an end on 11 November 1918 Penney had been awarded the Military Cross (MC) and was mentioned in despatches on 18 May 1917. On 22 November 1918 he was awarded the French Croix de guerre 1914–1918 and, the Belgian Croix de guerre on 4 September 1919.

== Between the wars ==
Immediately after the war, in March 1919, Penney became a General Staff Officer Grade 3 (GSO3) at the Signal Service Training Centre, where he remained until 13 June 1921, during which time he transferred, on 11 May 1921, to the newly formed Royal Corps of Signals. He then served in India, where he played rugby for the army and served as Assistant to the Signal Officer-in-Chief, India. In 1925 he married Shirley Mary Gurner; they had two daughters. Returning to England, he served briefly as an instructor at the Royal School of Signals from 22 March 1926 until 20 January 1927, and attended the Staff College, Camberley, graduating there in late 1928. Among his many fellow students at Camberley were John Whiteley, Clement West, Eric Dorman-Smith, Angus Collier, Reginald Savory, Philip Christison, Oliver Leese, Evelyn Barker, John Hawkesworth, Alec Bishop, Eric Nares, Eric Hayes, Charles Norman, Stanley Kirby, Edmund Beard, Christopher Woolner, Wilfrid Lloyd, Reginald Savory, Robert Bridgeman and Alfred Curtis. While there he was promoted to major on 26 June 1927.

Soon after he graduated from Camberley Penney was posted to the War Office as a GSO3, from 14 April 1929 until 15 January 1931, when he was posted to Shanghai, China as a brigade major, remaining there until March 1933. On 2 January 1933 he was made an Officer of the Order of the British Empire (OBE), and, on 1 July 1934, he was promoted to the brevet rank of lieutenant-colonel, and lieutenant-colonel on 1 April 1935. Upon being sent to India in 1935, where he was awarded the Distinguished Service Order (DSO) on 21 December 1937 and was mentioned in despatches on 18 February 1938 for his part in the Waziristan campaign, he returned to England and attended the Imperial Defence College in 1939, graduating from there later in the year. Penney was the first officer from the Royal Corps of Signals to do so.

== Second World War ==
=== Britain and the home front ===
Upon the outbreak of World War II in September 1939 Penney was still a student at the Imperial Defence College but, graduating soon afterwards, on 18 November he was promoted to colonel (with seniority backdated to 1 July 1937) and the acting rank of brigadier, and became the Deputy Director of Military Intelligence (DDMI) at the War Office on the sane date. With his rank of brigadier being made temporary on 18 May 1940, Penney remained in this post, therefore missing the Battle of France and subsequent Dunkirk evacuation, until November 1940 and, a month later, took over command of the 3rd Infantry Brigade in place of Brigadier Thomas Wilson. The brigade was one of three (the others being the 1st Guards and 2nd Infantry Brigades) which formed part of the 1st Infantry Division, whose General Officer Commanding (GOC) was then-Major-General Kenneth Anderson, and the command was Penney's first time leading a large infantry formation. The brigade was a Regular Army unit which had fought in France earlier in the year as part of the British Expeditionary Force (BEF) and was stationed on the Yorkshire coast on anti-invasion duties in the event of a German invasion.

=== The Middle East and North Africa ===
Remaining in that post for just over 9 months, on 10 October 1941 Penney received a promotion to the acting rank of major-general and, upon being sent to the Middle East, was made Signals Officer-in-Chief with Middle East Command (General Sir Claude Auchinleck) becoming the latter's chief signal officer. Auchinleck was preparing for an offensive in North Africa, which was then the only theatre of war in which British and Commonwealth troops were engaged in combat with the Axis powers.

Penney's task was to improve the communication systems to allow the Eighth Army to function efficiently, which in the Western Desert was not always an easy task, with poor communications, among many other reasons, having been responsible for the many setbacks during the North African campaign thus far. Penney, as Signals Officer-in-Chief, was to obtain for the army sufficient wireless radio sets, with sufficient range to cover the long distances between the numerous units.

Penney, whose rank of major-general was made temporary on 10 October 1942. On 18 February, Penney was made a Commander of the Order of the British Empire (CBE) and, on 25 June, his rank of major-general was made permanent (with seniority backdating to 17 November 1941). Alexander's, now Penney's superior officer, influence later secured Penney's next major appointment, as GOC of the 1st Infantry Division, in mid-October 1943. Just over two years after Penney had left the division, he returned as its GOC.

=== Italy ===
On 4 December, Penney's division departed North Africa for Italy and arrived there three days later, originally to reinforce Montgomery's Eighth Army. However, it was soon transferred to Lieutenant General Mark W. Clark's American Fifth Army, coming under the command of Major General John P. Lucas's US VI Corps, in preparation for Operation Shingle. By December 1943, the Allied Armies in Italy (AAI), consisting of the American Fifth and British Eighth Armies, commanded by General Alexander, were bogged down in front of the Winter Line defences, 80 miles south of Rome. Operation Shingle, General Alexander envisioned, would land VI Corps in an amphibious operation at the port town of Anzio, behind the German line, which ran from Monte Cassino to the mouth of the River Garigliano, and draw off German defenders from the Winter Line to face the new threat at Anzio, enabling elements of Clark's Fifth Army to break through at Cassino, drive up through the Liri valley and link up with VI Corps at Anzio.

The operation went ahead as planned, with Penney's 1st Division landing in the northern sector of Anzio, catching the Germans completely by surprise. However, the corps commander, Lucas, decided instead to consolidate his beachhead before following Alexander's instructions to drive for the Alban Hills. The German response was swift, with Generalfeldmarschall Albert Kesselring, C-in-C of German Army Group C, ordering all local troops, as well as reinforcements from Germany and France, forward to oppose the Allied landings at Anzio. In this way, by 26 January, four days after the operation started, opposing the Allies at Anzio were elements of six German divisions. At the same time, the Allied offensive on the main front at Cassino did not produce the desired result, meaning there could be little, if any, hope of an early link-up between the VI Corps and the rest of the Fifth Army, effectively leaving the former to face the inevitable German onslaught alone.

On 30 January, Lucas decided to make his move, ordering Penney's division, with Harmon's US 1st Armored Division in support, forwards to Campoleone, thus creating a salient in the line. The attack, however, failed in its objective of capturing the Campoleone station, with very heavy casualties, mainly to the exposed 3rd Brigade, and, in particular, to the 2nd Battalion, Sherwood Foresters, which had begun the assault with 35 officers and 786 other ranks (ORs), and by 31 January had been reduced to 8 officers and 250 ORs.

The Germans were now determined in their attempts to destroy the 3rd Brigade in its exposed position, as part of the first phase of their offensive to drive the VI Corps back into the sea. They launched their first major counterattack on 3 February, targeting the 3rd Brigade around Carroceto station and Aprilia. The positions held by the 2nd and 24th Brigades were infiltrated by the Germans and the 6th Battalion, Gordon Highlanders, suffered very heavy losses, with almost three whole rifle companies being destroyed, the majority of the men being taken prisoner. On the right flank, in the 24th Guards Brigade sector, with the loss of so many Gordons, the right flank was exposed and the Germans surged through it, only being prevented by the 1st Battalion, Irish Guards. The attacks ceased for a few days, resuming on 8 February and, although the 24th Guards Brigade, supported by elements of the American 504th PRCT, fought well and was engaged in severe fighting (during which time Major William Sidney of the 5th Battalion, Grenadier Guards was awarded the VC), both objectives, Carroceto station and "the Factory" fell to the Germans.

With Penney's division having taken severe losses – some 1,500 men in 24 hours, in addition to the earlier losses – and being forced to give up ground which had been fought for, he immediately requested reinforcements from Lucas and the relationship between the two men, which was never cordial, deteriorated, with Lucas being distrustful of the British and Penney himself frequently being critical of the former, having no confidence in him and believing Lucas to be out of his depth. Lucas, however, eventually sent the US 45th Infantry Division on 11 February, although it failed to retake the lost ground. Five days later the Germans launched another major attack, with the intention being to push the Allies back behind the Lateral Road. Penney's division was by now placed in reserve, and the German attack fell primarily on the 45th Division, but, on 18 February, the 1st Battalion, Loyal Regiment, of the 2nd Brigade, then defending the flyover where the Lateral Road crossed the road and railway and Carroceto, and which so far had suffered relatively light casualties, was involved, repelling many numerous attacks. The next few days saw desperate fighting by scattered American, British and German units, but the Allied lines just managed to hold and stabilise their lines.

On 17 February Penney, just returned to his caravan HQ after visiting the frontlines, was hit in the back by shellfire and evacuated to the rear. Alexander, who thought highly of Penney and was unwilling to lose him, ordered Major -General Gerald Templer, GOC of the newly arrived 56th (London) Infantry Division, and who Penney had succeeded as GOC of the 1st Division, to assume command of both divisions temporarily until Penney was sufficiently recovered to resume his command. Penney returned on 23 February, his wounds being deemed to be minor, although it was to effect him for the rest of his life, forcing his early retirement. By the time Penney resumed his role as GOC, the situation on the Anzio beachhead had changed, transforming from a series of short, sharp platoon or company-size battles, into a stalemate. Neither the Allies nor the Germans had the strength to sufficiently oust the other side, and although fighting continued, it was on a much smaller scale, and soon degenerated into warfare more reminiscent of the trenches of the Western Front during the Great War.

On 23 March 1944, Penney was made a Companion of the Order of the Bath (CB). Soon afterwards, towards the end of April, Brigadier Eric Dorman-Smith arrived to take command of the 3rd Brigade in Penney's division, which the latter greatly resented. The two men had attended the Staff College together in the late 1920s, and had not got along well together. Dorman-Smith had been sacked along with Auchinleck in August 1942 and returned to the United Kingdom but had been desperate to return to action, lobbying senior commanders to allow him to do so. Despite the fact that none of the senior British commanders in Italy wanted him, the order came directly from Field Marshal Sir Alan Brooke, the Chief of the Imperial General Staff (CIGS), the professional head of the British Army, and could not be refused. Penney was particularly unhappy at this news, and, upon Dorman-Smith's arrival at Anzio, greeted him with the words "I didn't want you at first and I do not want you now".

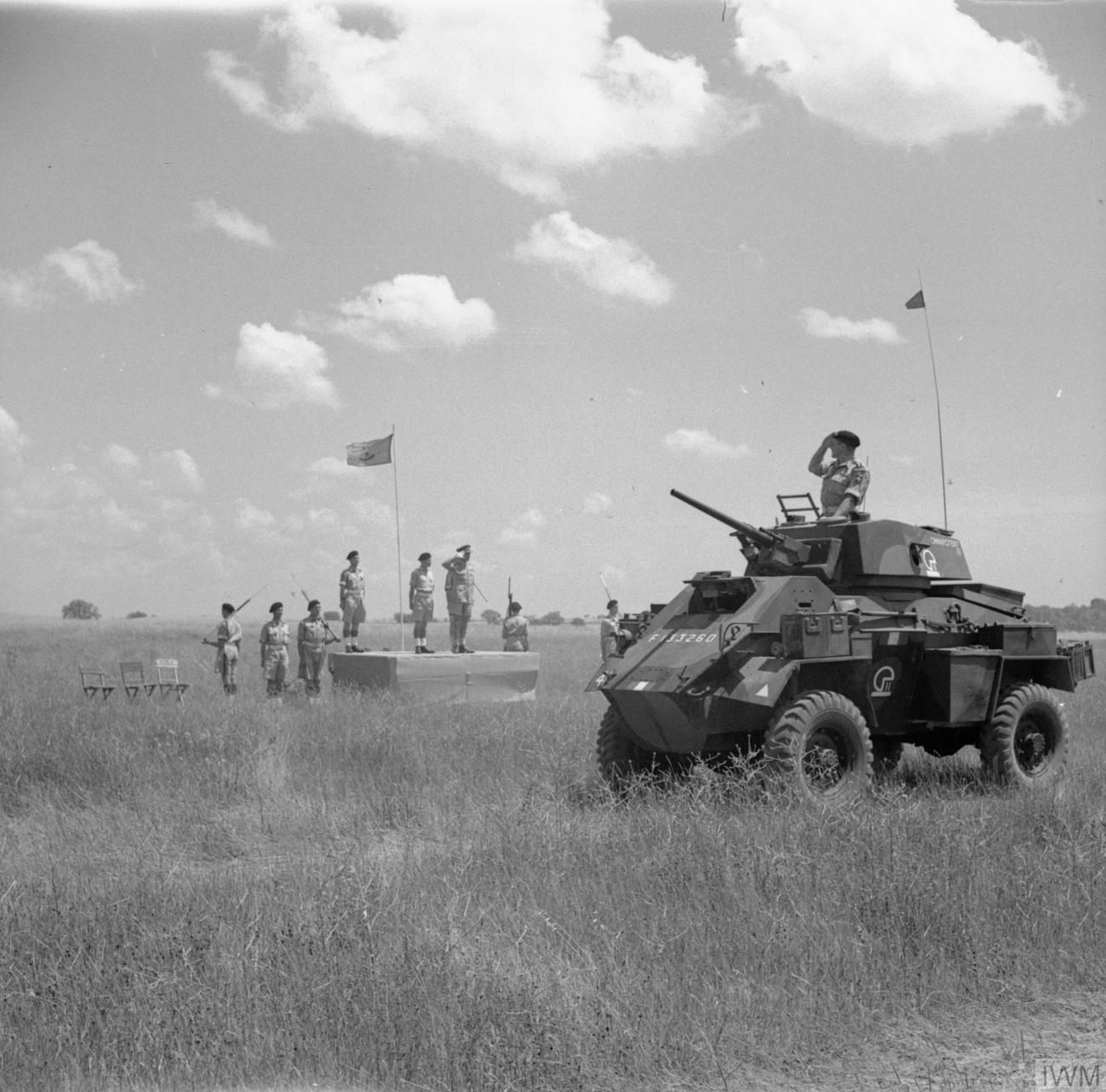
Major-General W. R. C. Penney, GOC 1st Division, takes the salute during a march-past of the 1st Reconnaissance Regiment, 23 June 1944. A Humber Mk IV armoured car passes the saluting base.

Soon after this incident, however, in early May, Penney's injuries, caused during the height of the German counterattacks, returned, causing him great pain and forcing him to take sick leave. He was replaced on a temporary basis as GOC of the 1st Division by Major-General John Hawkesworth, another of Penney's Staff College classmates, GOC of the 46th Division, then resting in Palestine. Hawkesworth returned to his division in late May, and Brigadier Charles Loewen, the Commander, Corps Royal Artillery (CRA) of X Corps, took command until Penney's return in mid-June, by which time Operation Diadem and the break-out from the Anzio beachhead had taken place, which eventually resulted in the capture of Rome. The 1st Division was then transferred to Lieutenant-General Charles Allfrey's V Corps, part of the Eighth Army. However, in late July, Penney's injuries returned again, and it became obvious that he was unable to continue on active service. Loewen, a Canadian officer serving in the British Army, became permanent GOC of the 1st Division. Soon before Penney left, he wrote an adverse report on Dorman-Smith, forcing the latter to be relieved of his command and his early retirement from the army.

=== The Far East ===
In November 1944 Penney became Director of Military Intelligence (DMI) at the HQ of Supreme Allied Command South East Asia, under Lord Mountbatten, remaining in this post until the end of the war. In this position, he was responsible for the details of the surrender of Japan in September 1945 and provided emergency supplies for the hundreds of thousands of liberated Allied POWs.

== Postwar ==
After the war ended in 1945, he became Assistant Controller Supplies (Munitions) at the Ministry of Supply until his retirement in 1949. From 22 December 1947 until 22 December 1957 he was Colonel Commandant of the Royal Corps of Signals. In retirement he worked at the Foreign Office. From 1953 he was the first Director of the London Communications Security Agency (an agency established to study and advise on British cypher security and which later evolved to become CESG). He stood down as Director of the London Communications Security Agency in 1957. Knighted the following year, in 1963 he remarried, after the death of his first wife in 1960, to Muriel Stella Daubeny and spent his final years in Berwick-on-Tweed, Northumberland, where he died on 3 December 1964, at the age of 68.

Although Mark Clark, the American Fifth Army commander, who was notable for his Anglophobia, seems to have thought little of Penney, describing him as "not too formidable a general but a good telephone operator", he was highly regarded by Lucian Truscott and Alexander and most of his subordinates. Richard Mead wrote that although he was a "rather methodical commander who tended to do things by the book", he also claims "Penney stands out as a rare signaller who managed to make the transition to a field commander, in so doing showing a great deal of understanding for the role of the infantry".

== Opinion on Anzio ==
Although Penney was perhaps Lucas's strongest critic, in hindsight he agreed that Lucas made the right decision not to immediately advance on Rome or the Alban Hills after the initial Anzio landings. He wrote later, in a letter to Lieutenant-General Sir Terence Sirey on 6 February 1956, that the Allies "could have had one night in Rome and 18 months in P.W. camps". Carlo D'Este wrote that Anzio "haunted Penney for the rest of his life. He believed his men had fought well but had never been given the credit they deserved for their sacrifice at Anzio. He was proud to have been their commander but remained bitter over what he considered to have been Lucas's failure".

== Bibliography ==
- D'Este, Carlo (1991). Fatal Decision: Anzio and the Battle for Rome. New York: Harper. ISBN 0-06-015890-5.
- Mead, Richard (2007). Churchill's Lions: a biographical guide to the key British generals of World War II. Stroud (UK): Spellmount. ISBN 978-1-86227-431-0.
- Smart, Nick (2005). Biographical Dictionary of British Generals of the Second World War. Barnsley, South Yorkshire: Pen and Sword Books. ISBN 1844150496.
- Vaughan-Thomas, Wynford (1961), Anzio

Military offices
Preceded by Gerald Templer	General Officer Commanding 1st Infantry Division; 1943–1944	Succeeded by Charles Loewen
Government offices
New title	Director of the London Communications Security Agency; 1953–1957	Succeeded by Robert Stannard
