= Eric Hayes =

British Army general (1896–1951)

Major-General Eric Hayes CB
- Born: 19 June 1896
- Died: 25 August 1951 (aged 55); London, England
- Military career
- Allegiance: United Kingdom
- Branch: British Army
- Service years: 1915–1947
- Rank: Major-General
- Service number: 10623
- Unit: Norfolk Regiment
- Commands: British Troops in China (1945); 3rd Infantry Division (1941–42); Yorkshire County Division (1941); 169th (London) Infantry Brigade (1940–41); 35th Infantry Brigade (1940); 2nd Battalion, Royal Norfolk Regiment (1939–40)
- Conflicts: First World War; Russian Civil War; Second World War
- Awards: Companion of the Order of the Bath; Mentioned in Despatches

Major-General Eric Charles Hayes, CB (19 June 1896 – 25 August 1951) was a senior British Army officer who served in both of the world wars.

== Early life and First World War ==
Born the son of Charles Frederick Hayes on 19 June 1896, Eric Hayes was educated at Sleaford School and, during the First World War, entered the Royal Military College, Sandhurst, where he was commissioned as a temporary second lieutenant into the Norfolk Regiment (later the Royal Norfolk Regiment) on 10 April 1915. Posted to the regiment's 1st Battalion, which was then serving as part of the 15th Brigade of the 5th Division, Hayes saw action on the Western Front and, from November 1917, on the Italian Front, before returning to the Western Front in April 1918. He was promoted to lieutenant on 19 June 1918, on his twenty-second birthday, and ended the war having been mentioned in dispatches.

== Between the wars ==
Continuing his military service into the interwar period, most of it being spent as a captain, Hayes volunteered for service in Russia during the Russian Civil War in 1919, serving alongside Brian Horrocks on the staff of the Anglo-Russian Brigade, based in Vladivostok, and for ten months found himself as a prisoner of war (POW) by the "Reds".

Returning to England, and marrying Florence Lllyanne, daughter of Henri Sudreau, in 1924, Hayes was promoted to captain on 10 January 1926, and attended the Staff College, Camberley from 1927 to 1928. His fellow students included several future general officers, such as Oliver Leese, Angus Collier, Eric Dorman-Smith, Eric Nares, Evelyn Barker, Philip Christison, Colin Jardine, Wilfrid Lloyd, Oliver Edgcumbe, Robert Bridgeman, John Hawkesworth, John Whiteley, Alfred Curtis, Edmund Beard, William Bishop, Stanley Kirby, Ronald Penney, Stephen Irwin, Charles Norman, Reginald Savory, Christopher Woolner and Clement West. Shortly after graduating from Camberley, from 21 May 1929 Hayes was appointed as a General Staff Officer Grade 3 (GSO3) at the War Office. Relinquishing this appointment on 1 March 1931, he was then made a brigade major with the 13th Infantry Brigade.

Promoted to brevet major on 1 January 1933, and brevet lieutenant colonel on 1 July 1937, he was made a lieutenant colonel on 28 September 1938 and became commanding officer (CO) of the 2nd Battalion of his regiment (restyled the Royal Norfolk Regiment in 1935), then stationed overseas in Gibraltar but returning to England the following year where it was assigned to Brigadier James Gammell's 4th Infantry Brigade, itself part of Major General Charles Loyd's 2nd Infantry Division.

== Second World War ==
Shortly after the outbreak of the Second World War in September 1939, Hayes led his battalion overseas to France as part of the British Expeditionary Force (BEF), arriving there in the third week of September. The battalion, along with the rest of the BEF, was not immediately engaged in action, unlike in World War I, and instead spent most of its time in France digging defensive positions, with relatively little time being allotted to training, as most of the Allied politicians and military commanders expecting a repeat of the trench warfare of 1914–1918.

Hayes did not remain with his battalion long, however, as, in January 1940, he returned to England to become commandant of the Company Commanders' School, and, in August, was promoted to brigadier and given command of the 35th Infantry Brigade, a second-line Territorial Army (TA) unit, which had recently fought in the Battle of France where it had suffered heavy losses. The brigade formed part of the 1st London Division, then commanded by Major General Claude Liardet, which in November was redesignated the 56th (London) Infantry Division, with Hayes's 35th Brigade subsequently being retitled the 169th (London) Infantry Brigade. He remained with the brigade, which was serving in Kent with the rest of the division (from January 1941 under Major General Montagu Stopford) as part of Lieutenant General Andrew Thorne's XII Corps on anti-invasion duties and training to repel a German invasion of the United Kingdom, until May 1941. On 10 May 1941 his permanent rank was advanced to colonel.

On 22 September 1941 he was promoted to the acting rank of major general and succeeded Major General Edward Lawson as general officer commanding (GOC) of the Yorkshire County Division, a recently created formation, comprising the 201st, 218th and 221st Independent Infantry Brigades, but no divisional troops. The division, serving under Lieutenant General Henry Willcox's I Corps, was one of several static divisions created with the sole intention of providing coastal defence, guarding the beaches against invasion.

However, just two months later, he was posted to the 3rd Infantry Division as its GOC, thereby succeeding Major General James Gammell. The division, in GHQ Home Forces reserve, was a Regular Army formation that had served in France under then-Major General Bernard Montgomery, and was composed of three infantry brigades – the 8th, 9th and 37th Infantry Brigades (the latter being redesignated as the 7th Infantry Brigade in December), and supporting divisional troops. In June 1942, the division went through another reorganisation, which resulted in the loss of the 7th Brigade, replaced by the 33rd Tank Brigade, as part of the "mixed division" experiment, which was intended to strengthen infantry and tank cooperation, although in the end the experiment was eventually abandoned.

He was not to remain with the division for much longer, however, as in mid-December 1942 he was relieved as GOC of the 3rd Division, his successor being Major General William Ramsden. He continued his war service and commanded the Nigeria Area in West Africa from January 1943 and returned to England to command the East Central District from late 1943 before becoming Head of the British Military Mission to China in early January 1945, and was made GOC British Troops in China in the following year. In that capacity he witnessed the surrender of Japan in China in September 1945. For his services he was awarded the Companion of the Order of the Bath in 1946.

== Postwar ==
Hayes retired from the army, after thirty-two years of service, on 20 January 1947. He maintained his connections with the army and his regiment, becoming colonel of the Royal Norfolk Regiment from 9 February 1951 until his sudden death, caused by a short illness, in August 1951.

== Bibliography ==
- Smart, Nick (2005). Biographical Dictionary of British Generals of the Second World War. Barnesley: Pen & Sword. ISBN 1844150496.

Military offices
| Preceded by Edward Lawson | GOC Yorkshire County Division; September–November 1941 | Post redesignated East Riding District |
| Preceded by James Gammell | GOC 3rd Infantry Division; 1941–1942 | Succeeded by William Ramsden |
Honorary titles
| Preceded by John Daunt | Colonel of the Royal Norfolk Regiment; February–August 1951 | Succeeded by Claude Wilkinson |
