= Charles Norman (British Army officer) =

British Army officer

Major-General Charles Norman CBE
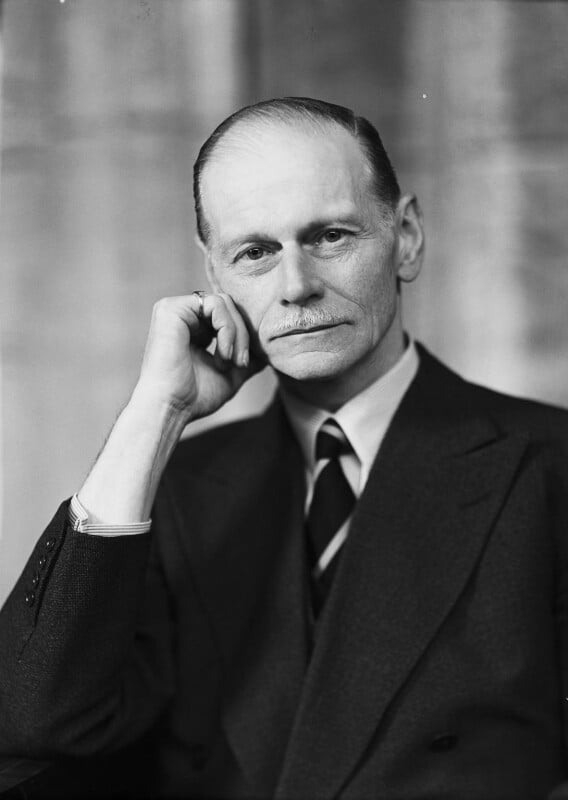
- Norman in 1950
- Born: 13 February 1891; Marylebone, London, England
- Died: September 1974 (aged 83); Maidstone, Kent, England
- Military career
- Allegiance: United Kingdom
- Branch: British Army
- Service years: 1910–1946
- Rank: Major-General
- Nickname: "Charlie"
- Service number: 8184
- Unit: Queen's Own West Kent Yeomanry
- Commands: Aldershot District (1944); 10th Armoured Division (1942–1943); 8th Armoured Division (1941–1942); 27th Armoured Brigade (1940–1941); 1st Armoured Reconnaissance Brigade (1940); 9th Queen's Royal Lancers (1936–1938)
- Conflicts: First World War; Second World War
- Awards: Commander of the Order of the British Empire; Mentioned in Despatches

Major-General Charles Wake Norman, CBE (13 February 1891 – September 1974) was a senior British Army officer who served in the First and Second World Wars and became General Officer Commanding Aldershot District in 1944.

== Military career ==
Charles Wake Norman was born on 13 February 1891 in Marylebone, London, England, and was educated at Eton College and then the University of Cambridge. Norman was commissioned as a second lieutenant into the Queen's Own West Kent Yeomanry, a Territorial Force unit, on 6 October 1910. On 20 August 1913 he transferred to the 9th Lancers. He served with the regiment when it was deployed to France, soon after the outbreak of the First World War in August 1914. However, at the end of the month he was wounded and captured, and was destined to remain as a prisoner of war for the next four years, remaining in captivity at Krefeld, Germany.

After being released in 1919, Norman remained in the army, initially with the 9th Lancers serving around the British Empire, in India and Egypt. After marrying in 1925, he returned to England, where he became an instructor at the Royal Military College, Sandhurst. He then attended the Staff College, Camberley, from 1927 to 1928. His fellow students there included Philip Christison, Evelyn Barker, Oliver Leese, Eric Dorman-Smith, Eric Hayes, John Whiteley, Ronald Penney, John Hawkesworth, Clement West, Christopher Woolner, Robert Bridgeman and Stanley Kirby. All of these men would, like Norman himself, reach major general's rank or higher and distinguish themselves during the Second World War.

Norman served in the Second World War, initially as Inspector of the Royal Armoured Corps. In 1940 he was made commander of the 1st Armoured Reconnaissance Brigade during the Battle of France and then commander of the 27th Armoured Brigade. He was appointed General Officer Commanding (GOC) 8th Armoured Division in 1941 and GOC 10th Armoured Division in the Middle East in 1942. He went on to be GOC Aldershot District in 1944 before becoming Major-General in charge of Armoured Fighting Vehicles at Middle East Command in 1945. He retired from the army in 1946.

Norman lived at Bromley Common until 1946, and was appointed High Sheriff of Kent in 1950. He was the President of Kent County Cricket Club in 1956.

== Bibliography ==
- Smart, Nick (2005). Biographical Dictionary of British Generals of the Second World War. Barnesley: Pen & Sword. ISBN 1844150496.

Military offices
Preceded by Richard McCreery	GOC 8th Armoured Division; 1941−1942	Succeeded by Charles Gairdner
Preceded by Alexander Gatehouse	GOC 10th Armoured Division; 1942–1943	Succeeded by Horace Birks
New command	GOC Aldershot District; September–December 1944	Succeeded by Henry Curtis
Honorary titles
Preceded by Desmond Beale-Brown	Colonel of the 9th Queen's Royal Lancers; 1940–1950	Succeeded by Sir Christopher Peto
