= 27th Armoured Brigade =

- Formation sign of the 27th Armoured Brigade
- Active: 26 November 1940–27 July 1944
- Country: United Kingdom
- Branch: British Army
- Type: Armoured
- Size: Brigade
- Part of: 9th Armoured Division; 79th Armoured Division; Independent Brigade
- Equipment: M4 Sherman; M4 Sherman DD
- Engagements: Battle of Normandy

Commanders
- Notable commanders: Brigadier George Erroll Prior-Palmer

The 27th Armoured Brigade was an armoured brigade of the British Army that served in the Second World War and played a crucial role in the Normandy landings on 6 June 1944 and the following Battle of Normandy until disbandment in late 1944.

== Origin ==
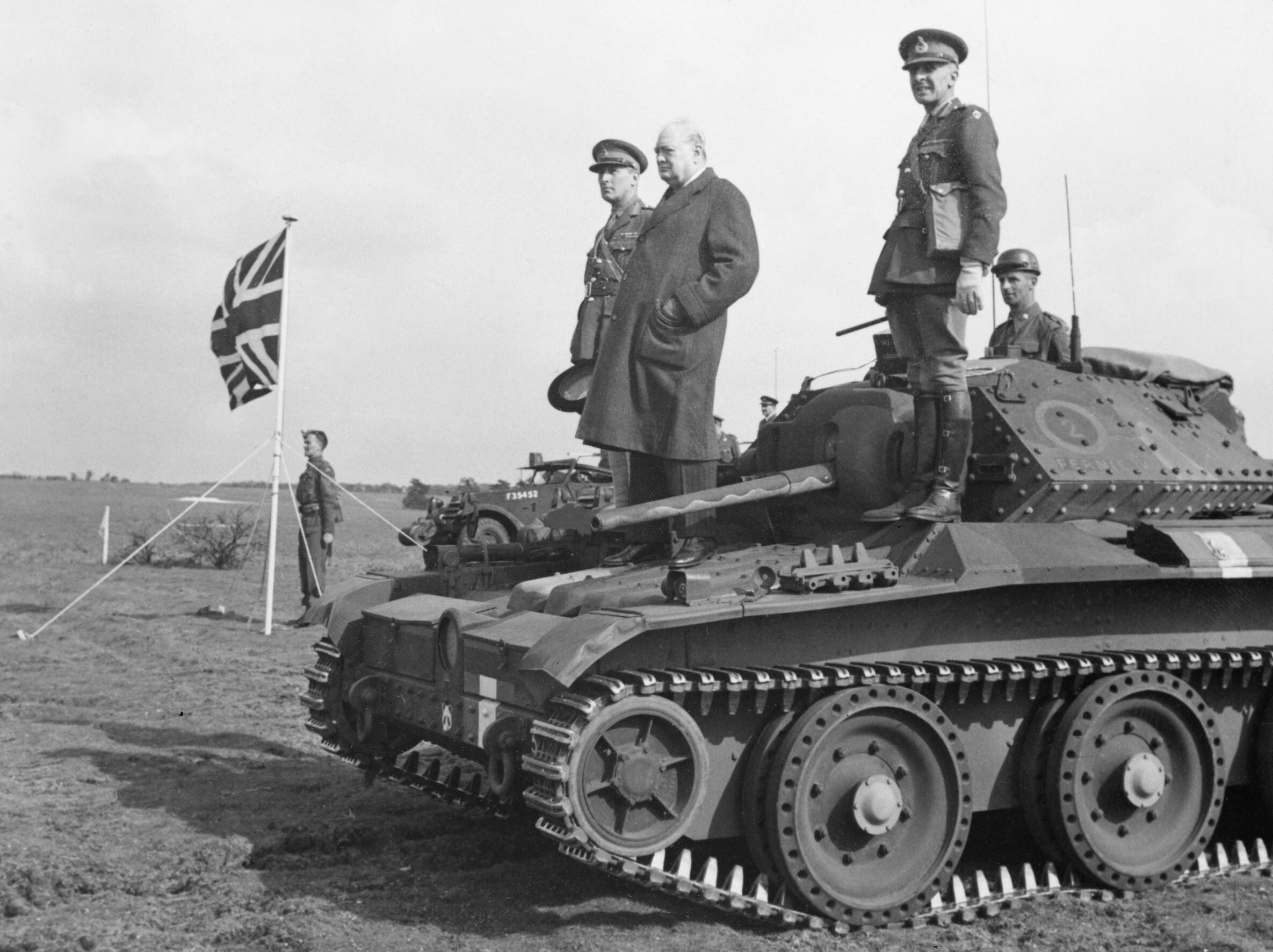
Winston Churchill stands on a Covenanter tank of the 4th/7th Royal Dragoon Guards to take the salute at an inspection of the 9th Armoured Division near Newmarket, Suffolk, 16 May 1942. Also pictured is Major General Brian Horrocks, the division commander.

The 27th Armoured Brigade was formed in the United Kingdom on 26 November 1940 by the conversion of the 1st Armoured Reconnaissance Brigade as a constituent of the new 9th Armoured Division. The brigade was used to experiment with Hobart's Funnies, specialised armoured vehicles and on 8 September 1942 it was transferred to the 79th Armoured Division, which concentrated the various specialised armoured units. On 20 October 1943 the 27th Armoured Brigade became an independent GHQ formation and was attached to the 3rd Infantry Division to spearhead I Corps during its landing at Sword Beach on D-Day in June 1944.

== Order of battle ==
- 4th/7th Royal Dragoon Guards (left 31 January 1944)
- 13th/18th Royal Hussars (left 29 July 1944)
- 1st East Riding Yeomanry (left 8 October 1943, rejoined 14 February 1944, left 29 July 1944)
- 148th Regiment Royal Armoured Corps (from 8 October 1943, left 31 January 1944)
- Staffordshire Yeomanry (from 14 February 1944, left 29 July 1944)
- 1st Battalion, Queen Victoria's Rifles (from 2 December 1940, redesignated 7th Battalion, King's Royal Rifle Corps 1 April 1941)
- 7th Battalion, King's Royal Rifle Corps (from 1 April 1941, left 13 April 1943)

Commanders

- Brigadier Charles Norman (until 15 October 1941)
- Brigadier Arthur Fisher (from 15 October 1941 until 1 March 1942)
- Brigadier J. G. de W. Mullens (from 1 March 1942 until 25 April 1943)
- Brigadier George Prior-Palmer (from 25 April 1943)

== Operational history ==
The brigade was assigned a crucial role in the Normandy landings. The 13/18th Hussars, equipped with M4 Sherman DD amphibious tanks, were to accompany the initial assault on Sword Beach by the 8th Brigade Group of the 3rd Infantry Division, while the rest of the 27th Armoured Brigade would support the division's follow-up attacks towards Caen.

=== D-Day ===
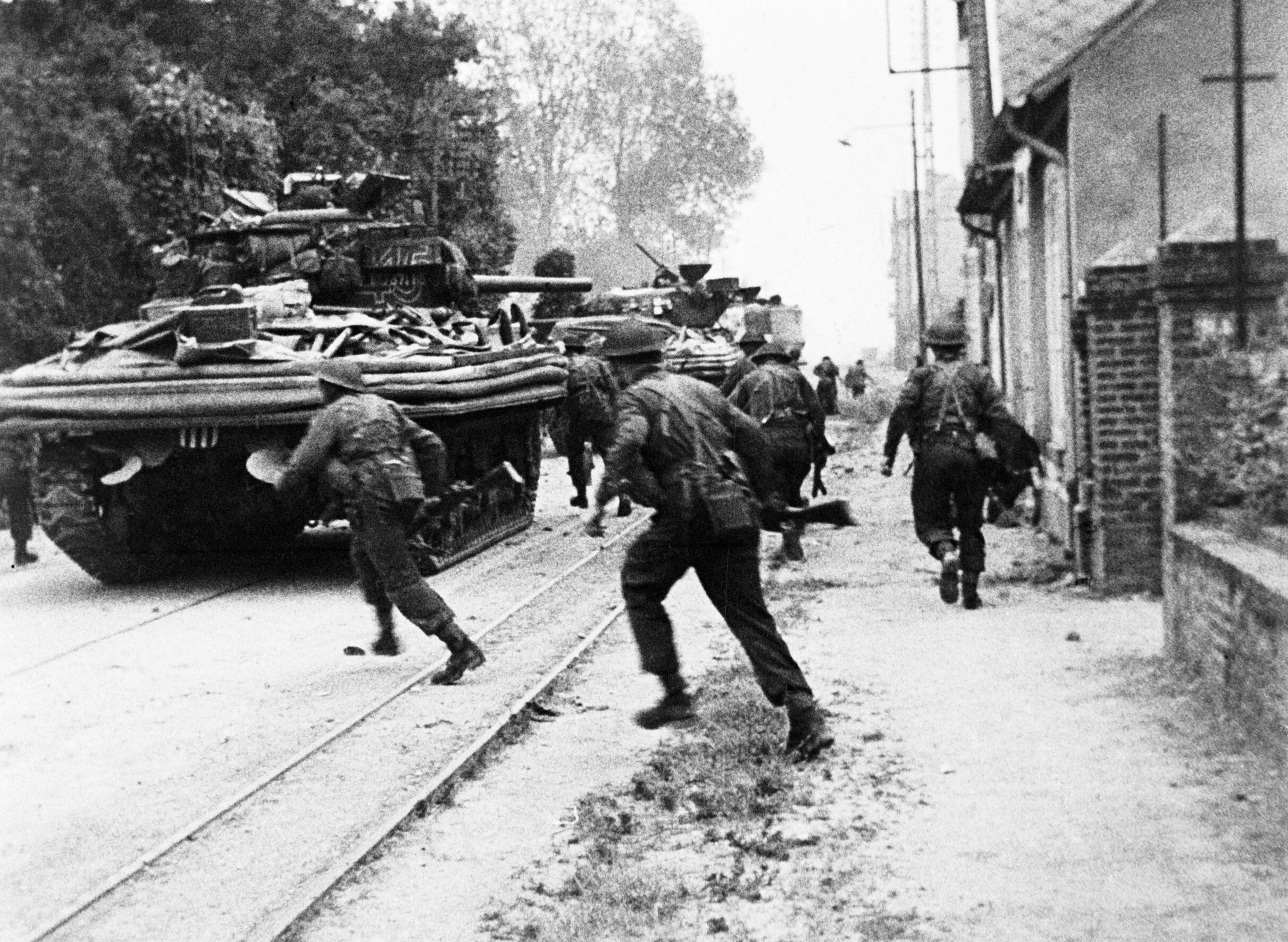
Men of No. 4 Commando engaged in house to house fighting with the Germans at Riva Bella, near Ouistreham. Sherman DD tanks of 'B' Squadron, 13th/18th Royal Hussars are providing fire support and cover, 6 June 1944.

On the morning of D-Day the sea was rough and 27th Armoured Brigade's commander, Brigadier George Prior-Palmer, in conjunction with Captain Bush, Royal Navy, decided to launch his DD tanks closer inshore than had been planned. Thirty-four out of forty DD tanks of 'A' and 'B' Squadrons of the 13/18th Hussars were launched from their LCTs (Landing Craft Tank) 5,000 yd (4,600 m) from Sword. One sank immediately and the remainder made slow progress in the heavy seas and were overtaken by the leading landing craft carrying infantry and 'flail' tanks. Two DD tanks were struck by landing craft and lost on the run in. The remaining six tanks of the 13/18th Hussars were taken in to the beach aboard their LCT. The regiment lost six tanks knocked out in the surf and four shortly after, leaving 27 to support the infantry in their advance off the beach. One squadron supported the 1st Battalion, Suffolk Regiment in their attack on the 'Hillman' strongpoint. Another squadron assisted No. 4 Commando to capture Ouistreham on the left flank of the beachhead. 'C' Squadron landed last, towing waterproofed sledges containing the ammunition reserve but took a long time to get clear of the beach.

The Shermans of the Staffordshire Yeomanry landed later on the morning of D-Day to support 185th Brigade, the spearhead of 3rd Division's attack inland. This was probably the only unit of conventional tanks landed that day on Sword. The advance was to be led by a mobile column of the 2nd Battalion, King's Shropshire Light Infantry (KSLI) riding on the Staffordshire Yeomanry's tanks but at noon the heavy weapons of the battalion were held up on the congested beaches and the tanks by a minefield. The leading tanks caught up with the infantry at the Periers rise but four tanks were knocked out by flanking fire from German guns in a wood, which had to be dealt with. By 16:00 hours one squadron of the Staffordshire Yeomanry was with the advanced infantry and self-propelled 17-pounders from the 20th Anti-Tank Regiment, Royal Artillery at Beuville and Bieville on the direct road to Caen, a second was supporting the attack on 'Hillman' and the third was guarding the flank at Point 61 on the Periers rise. Soon afterwards a scouting troop of the Staffordshires reported about forty German tanks advancing fast. These were from Panzer Regiment 22 in the 21st Panzer Division (Major-General Edgar Feuchtinger) primarily equipped with Panzer IV tanks, supplemented with obsolete French SOMUA S35s and self-propelled anti-tank guns on various French chassis. These panzers had already suffered losses when attacked by Typhoon fighter-bombers on the road from Caen.

The Staffordshire squadron from Hillman was quickly brought up and several of the German tanks were knocked out by the Staffordshires and the anti-tank guns of the 2nd KSLI and the 20th A/T Regiment RA. The panzers turned aside into the woods, pursued by the Yeomanry and by field-gun fire, suffering more losses when they showed themselves again. Drawing off a second time, the Panzers were reinforced and then made a wide detour towards the Periers ridge. Here they were met and driven off by the squadron positioned there. The British claimed 13 panzers knocked out for the loss of one SP gun. Fuechtinger later reported that his division lost 54 out of 124 tanks in these actions and by the earlier Typhoon attacks. At nightfall his division was still interposed between I Corps and Caen. The city did not fall for another month, greatly dislocating the British operations. The third regiment of 27th Armoured Brigade, the East Riding Yeomanry (also equipped with Sherman DD tanks) landed later on D-Day with the reserve of the 3rd Division, the 9th Brigade Group.

=== The Battle for Caen ===
During the follow-up operations after D-Day the 27th Armoured Brigade continued to support the attacks of I Corps along the River Orne towards Caen. On 11 June a squadron of the 13/18th Hussars supported 6th Airborne Division attack along the river and later in the month the regiment supported the 51st (Highland) Infantry Division in further attacks along the river. On 8 and 9 July, the 27th Armoured Brigade supported Operation Charnwood, the capture of Caen.

=== Operation Goodwood ===
On 18 July the British Second Army began an operation south from Caen (Operation Goodwood). I Corps was to attack along the left flank of the main armoured thrust. The 3rd Division plus one brigade from the 51st (Highland) Infantry Division moved forward at 07:45 hours, supported by 27th Armoured Brigade. The German reception by troops of the 346th Infantry Division and the 16th Luftwaffe Field Division was varied; the villages of Sannerville and Banneville la Campagne had been well hit by the preliminary attack by RAF Bomber Command and both were in British hands by midday. Touffreville was on the edge of the Bomber Command aiming point and it held out until evening. There was heavy fighting in the mined and broken country through which the road ran to Troarn. Attacking by that route and from Sannerville, the 3rd Division found Troarn strongly defended and at nightfall was still about a mile short of the town. Between Manneville and Guillerville, south of the Troarn–Caen road, there was stiff fighting against the German infantry of 711th Infantry Division, rushed up by bicycle from the coast, supported by some Tiger tanks. It was midnight when both villages were cleared. The day's fighting had cost the British 500 casualties and 18 tanks.

At dawn the following day infantry of the 3rd Division were working their way through orchards towards Troarn. The place was defended, with well-sited outlying infantry positions. The division attacked four times during the day, supported by the 27th Armoured Brigade but all failed. I Corps was reinforced, but the Goodwood offensive petered out the following day.

=== Disbandment ===
After Goodwood the emphasis of the Second Army switched away from the Caen sector and on 27 July 1944 the 27th Armoured Brigade was broken up, its three regiments being distributed to other formations.

== See also ==
- British Armoured formations of World War II
- List of British brigades of the Second World War
