= Commander-in-Chief, Home Forces =

Commander of the British Forces in the UK during World War I and II

Home Forces
- Commander-in-Chief, Home Forces insignia during the Second World War
- Active: 1915–1921; 1939–1945
- Country: United Kingdom
- Branch: British Army
- Role: Responsible for overseeing the training and equipment of formations in preparation for their deployment overseas
- Headquarters: St Paul's School, London

Commander-in-Chief, Home Forces was a senior officer in the British Army during the First and Second World Wars. The role of the appointment was firstly to oversee the training and equipment of formations in preparation for their deployment overseas, and secondly, to command the forces required to defend the United Kingdom against an enemy incursion or invasion.

== The First World War ==
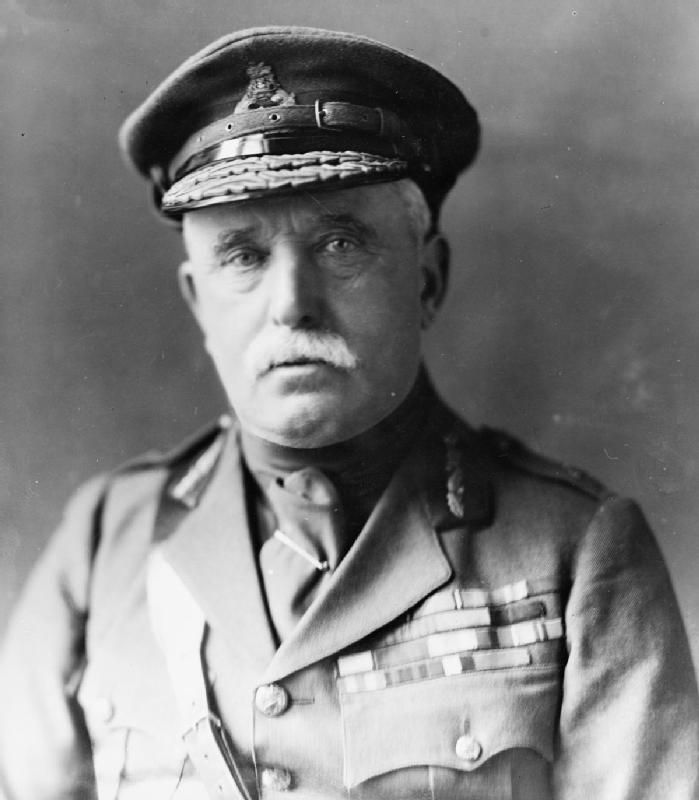
Field Marshal Sir John French, the first Commander-in-Chief, Home Forces.

The post was created for Field Marshal Sir John French in December 1915, after his enforced resignation as the Commander-in-Chief of the British Expeditionary Force in the aftermath of the Battle of Loos. Bitterly disappointed, Lord French regarded the appointment as a demotion. Despite this, he energetically restructured the system of military training, drew up plans to defend the country against a German invasion and devised the first British air defence system, so that incoming Zeppelins and bombers could be tracked and countered by fighters and anti-aircraft artillery.

In February 1918, following a series of policy disputes with the prime minister, David Lloyd George, Sir William Robertson was forced to resign as Chief of the Imperial General Staff and was given the Home Forces role. Like the appointment of French, this was regarded as a demotion.

In April 1919, despite the end of hostilities, Lord Haig was appointed to the role by Winston Churchill, the newly appointed Secretary of State for War, who hoped that Haig would use the army to suppress the domestic civil unrest which he believed was imminent; however Haig refused to allow his troops "to act as policemen". The post was abolished in January 1920.

=== Commanders-in-Chief, Home Forces, 1915 to 1921 ===
- Field Marshal Sir John French – December 1915 to May 1918
- Field Marshal Sir William Robertson – 1918 to 1919
- Field Marshal Douglas Haig, 1st Earl Haig – 1919 to 1921

== The Second World War ==
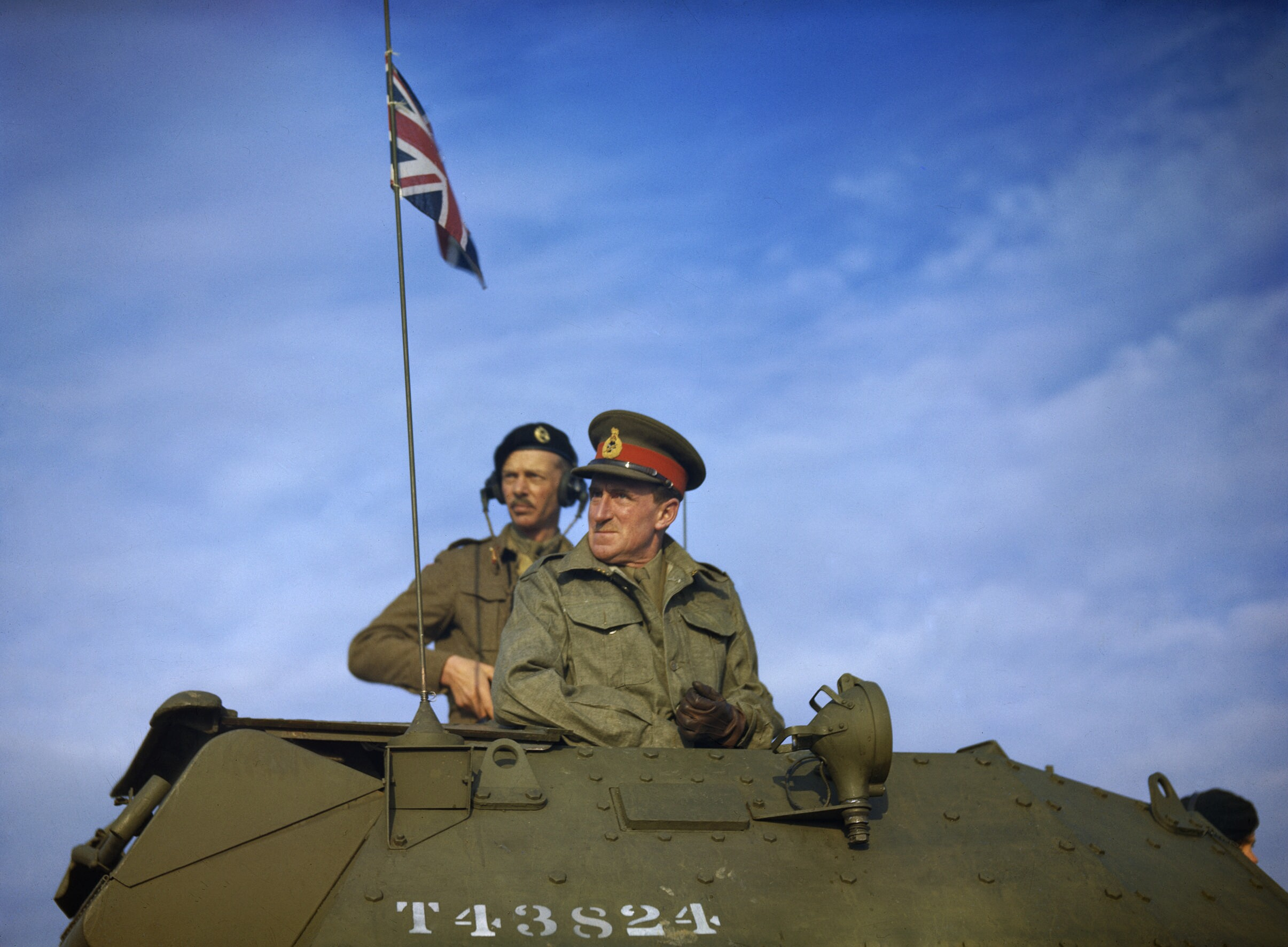
General Sir Bernard Paget inspecting a large-scale armoured exercise in Yorkshire, 1942.

The post of Commander-in-Chief, Home Forces was resurrected for Sir Walter Kirke on 3 September 1939. Kirke, whose main responsibility was to reinforce the BEF in France, had very limited resources available, with six poorly trained and equipped Territorial Army divisions in England, two in Scotland and three more in reserve. With France still a powerful ally, Kirke believed that the eastern coasts of England and Scotland were the most vulnerable, with ports and airfields given priority.

After the fall of Poland, the British War Cabinet became concerned about exaggerated intelligence reports, aided by German disinformation, of large airborne forces which could be launched against Britain. At the insistence of Winston Churchill, then the First Lord of the Admiralty, a request was made that the General Kirke should prepare a plan to repel a large-scale invasion. Kirke presented his plan on 15 November 1939, known as "Plan Julius Caesar" or "Plan J-C" because of the code word "Julius" which would be used for a likely invasion and "Caesar" for an imminent invasion. Julius was the codeword to bring troops to a state of readiness within eight hours. "Julius Caesar"'s [basis] was the dual assumption that the landing of seaborne troops in any number presupposed the early capture of a port, and that parachutists or other airborne forces would play a vital part in any attempt that the enemy might make." General Kirke's planning thus emphasized "prompt annihilation or capture of parachutists and other airborne troops as they descended or were assembling on the ground." The codeword Caesar meant an invasion was imminent, and units were to be readied for immediate action. Kirke's plan assumed the Germans would use 4,000 paratroopers, followed by 15,000 troops landed via civilian aircraft once airfields had been secured (Germany only actually had 6,000 such troops), and at least one division of 15,000 troops to be used in an amphibious assault.

Kirke's successor, Sir Edmund Ironside was replaced by Sir Alan Brooke in July 1940. The headquarters was established at Kneller Hall in late 1939 but moved out to St Paul's School, London in July 1940.

In mid-1940, the GHQ Reserve consisted of IV Corps (2nd Armoured Div, 1st Armoured Reconnaissance Brigade, and 43rd) and VII Corps (the undersized 2nd NZ Expeditionary Force (UK); 1st Armoured Division, and 1st Canadian Division).

=== Commanders-in-Chief, Home Forces, 1939 to 1945 ===
- General Sir Walter Kirke – September 1939 to May 1940
- General Sir Edmund Ironside – May to July 1940
- General Sir Alan Brooke – July 1940 to December 1941
- General Sir Bernard Paget – December 1941 to January 1944
- General Sir Harold Franklyn – January 1944 to 1945

== See also ==
- British anti-invasion preparations of the Second World War
- Operation Sea Lion

== Sources ==
- Barclay, Gordon (2013). If Hitler Comes: Preparing for Invasion: Scotland 1940. Birlinn Ltd. ISBN 978-1-84341-062-1.
- Cassar, George H. (1985). The Tragedy of Sir John French. University of Delaware. ISBN 978-0-87413-241-0.
- Grossman, Mark (2006). World Military Leaders: A Biographical Dictionary. Facts on File. ISBN 978-0-8160-4732-1.
- Millman, Brock (2001). Pessimism and British War Policy, 1916-1918. London: Routledge. ISBN 978-0714650791.
- Newbold, David John (1988). British Planning and Preparations to Resist Invasion on Land, September 1939 – September 1940 (pdf). kclpure.kcl.ac.uk (PhD). King's College, University of London. OCLC 940319374.
- Place, Timothy Harrison (2000). Military Training in the British Army, 1940–1944: From Dunkirk to D-Day. London: Routledge. ISBN 978-0-7146-8091-0.
- Reid, Walter (2009). Architect of Victory: Douglas Haig. Edinburgh: Birlinn Ltd. ISBN 978-1843410454.
- Taylor, A. J. P. (1965). English History 1914–1945. Oxford University Press. p. 47. ISBN 978-0-19-821715-2.
