= Erroll Prior-Palmer =

British Army general (1903-1977)

Major-General Erroll Prior-Palmer CB DSO
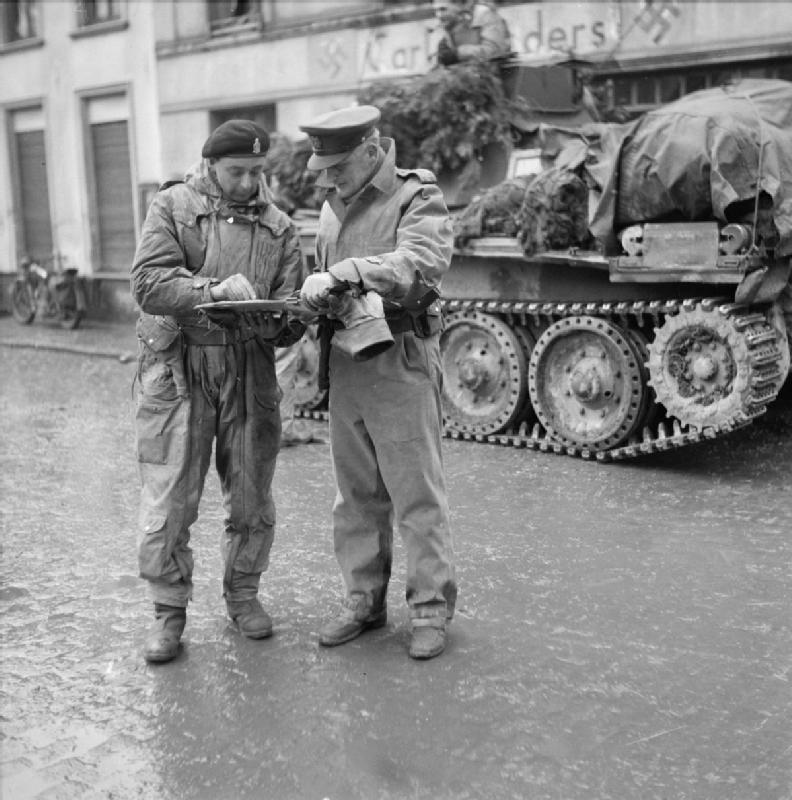
- Prior-Palmer (right), commanding 8th Armoured Brigade, consults a map in Issum, Germany, 6 March 1945
- Born: 20 February 1903
- Died: 18 August 1977 (aged 74)
- Relatives: Lucinda Green (daughter); Otho Prior-Palmer (brother)
- Military career
- Allegiance: United Kingdom
- Branch: British Army
- Service years: 1923–1958
- Rank: Major-General
- Service number: 27516
- Unit: 9th Queen's Royal Lancers
- Commands: British Army Staff Washington (1953–1956); 6th Armoured Division (1951–1953); 8th Armoured Brigade (1944–1945); 27th Armoured Brigade (1943–1944)
- Conflicts: Second World War
- Awards: Companion of the Order of the Bath; Distinguished Service Order; Mentioned in Despatches; Legion of Honour (France); Croix de Guerre (Belgium)

Major-General George Erroll Prior-Palmer, CB, DSO (20 February 1903 – 18 August 1977) was a senior British Army officer and businessman of Anglo-Irish origins. He saw service in the Second World War and later was military attaché at the British Embassy in Washington, D.C., and General Officer Commanding the 6th Armoured Division. In civilian life he entered the world of commercial shipping and was successively a director of the Union-Castle Line, manager of Cayzer Irvine, and managing director of Overseas Containers Limited, before retiring in 1969.

== Early life ==
The son of Prior Spunner Prior-Palmer, of County Sligo and 32 Merrion Square, Dublin, and Anne Leslie Gason, of Kilteelagh, County Tipperary, Prior-Palmer was educated in England at Wellington College and at the Royal Military College, Sandhurst.

== Military career ==
From Sandhurst, Prior-Palmer was in August 1923 commissioned as a second lieutenant into the 9th Lancers, in which his elder brother Otho Prior-Palmer was already serving. He was promoted captain in 1930, and in November 1933 was seconded as adjutant in the Territorial Army. After the outbreak of war, in 1940 he saw active service in North West Europe, where he was mentioned in despatches, and in 1944 took part in the Normandy landings as commander of the 27th Armoured Brigade, serving on the continent until 1945. He was promoted to lieutenant colonel in 1941, colonel in 1946, and brigadier in 1948. In 1946 he went to Washington, D.C., as military attaché at the British Embassy, a two-year posting. In 1951 he was promoted major general and given command of the newly reformed 6th Armoured Division. In 1953 he returned to Washington, D.C., as Commander, British Army Staff, and Military Member, British Joint Services Mission, this time remaining for three years. He was President of the Regular Commissions Board from 1956 to 1957 and retired from the service in 1958.

Prior-Palmer was awarded the Distinguished Service Order, French Legion of Honour and Belgian Croix de Guerre in 1945, and appointed a Companion of the Order of the Bath in 1952.

== Business career ==
In 1958 Prior-Palmer joined the British & Commonwealth Shipping Company. From 1959 to 1964 he was the Southampton area director of the Union-Castle Line, manager of Cayzer Irvine and special adviser to the British and Commonwealth Group from 1964 to 1965, and from 1965 to 1969 managing director of Overseas Containers Ltd. He retired in 1969, but from 1973 until his death was a director of J. A. Peden Ltd.

== Other appointments ==
- President, Wessex Rehabilitation Association, 1962–1977
- Patron, League of Venturers, 1972–1977

== Private life ==
In 1935, Prior-Palmer married Katherine Edith, daughter of Frank Bibby, and with her had one daughter, Anne. In 1948, he married Lady Doreen Hersey Winifred Hope, the younger daughter of Victor Hope, 2nd Marquess of Linlithgow, and they had one son, Simon Erroll, and one daughter, Lucinda Jane.

Prior-Palmer was a member of the Cavalry and Guards Club and the Royal Ocean Racing Club and in retirement lived at Appleshaw House, Andover, Hampshire. He died on 18 August 1977.

== Biography ==
In 2026, a biography of Prior-Palmer, Erroll: The Extraordinary Life of Erroll Prior-Palmer, written by his son Simon Prior-Palmer, was published by Chiselbury Publishing. The book examines his military career during the Second World War and his subsequent career in international shipping.

Military offices
New command	GOC 6th Armoured Division; 1951–1953	Succeeded by Francis Mitchell
