= HMS Defender (D114) =

Destroyer of the Royal Navy

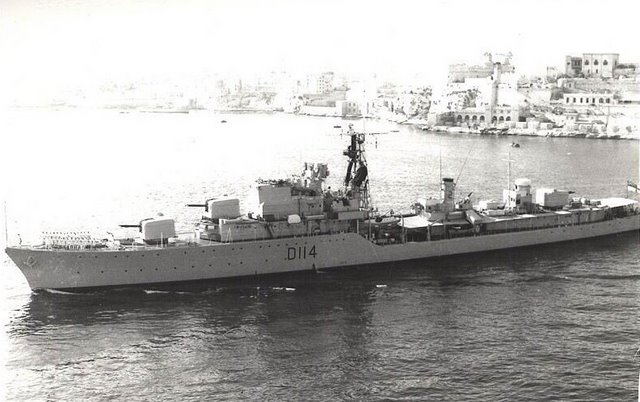
- HMS Defender leaving Malta

History

United Kingdom
- Name: HMS Defender
- Ordered: 16 February 1945
- Builder: Alexander Stephen and Sons
- Laid down: 22 March 1949
- Launched: 27 July 1950
- Commissioned: 5 December 1952
- Identification: Pennant number: D114
- Motto: Fendendo vince; ("By defence I conquer")
- Fate: Listed for disposal 1969; Used for target practice and sold to James A White & Co, Inverkeithing 10 May 1972 for breaking up.
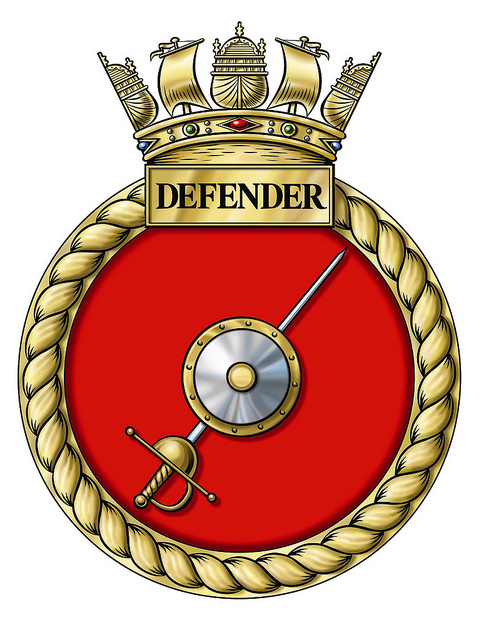
- Badge: On a Field Red, a fencing buckler and rapier Silver and Gold

General characteristics
- Class & type: Daring-class destroyer
- Displacement: Standard: 2,830 tons, Full load: 3,820 tons
- Length: 390 ft (120 m)
- Beam: 43 ft (13 m)
- Draught: 13.6 ft (4.1 m)
- Propulsion: 2 Foster Wheeler boilers (650 psi, 850 °F), Parsons steam turbines, 2 shafts, 54,000 shp (40 MW)
- Speed: 30 knots (56 km/h)
- Range: 4,400 nmi (8,100 km) at 20 kn (37 km/h)
- Complement: Approximately 300
- Sensors & processing systems: Radar Type 293Q target indication; Radar Type 291 air warning; Radar Type 274 navigation; Radar Type 275 fire control on director Mk.VI; Radar Type 262 fire control on director CRBF and STAAG Mk.II
- Armament: 6 QF 4.5 in /45 (114 mm) Mark V in 3 twin mountings UD Mark VI; 4 40 mm /60 Bofors A/A in 2 twin mounts STAAG Mk.II; 2 40 mm /60 Bofors A/A in 1 twin mount Mk.V; 2 pentad tubes for 21 inch (533 mm) torpedoes Mk.IX; 1 Squid anti submarine mortar

HMS Defender was a Daring-class destroyer of the Royal Navy.

Built as yard number 609 at Alexander Stephen and Sons, and originally intended to be named Dogstar, she was launched on 27 July 1950. After a career which saw her involved in the Korean War and conflicts in Malaya, Cyprus, Suez and Aden, she was listed for disposal in 1969, and was used for target practice in the Forth. She was sold to James A White & Co Ltd, Inverkeithing, Fife for breaking in 1972.

== Career ==
In 1953 Defender took part in the Fleet Review to celebrate the Coronation of Queen Elizabeth II. She had commissioned for the Far East during 1953 and 1954 and operated with US Navy in Japanese waters during October 1953, taking part in the Korean War.

In 1954 she located the wreck of the battleship Prince of Wales in position 3°33.6′N 104°28.7′E. Taking part in the Malay Emergency, Defender carried out a coastal bombardment on the Johor coast, following which she steamed up the Johor River for 9 miles (14 km) reminding any hostile watchers of the Royal Navy presence. At some time between 1955 and 1958 she took part in operations against the terrorist organisation EOKA in Cyprus.

On 19 July 1956 she brought Faisal II of Iraq across the Channel to Dover for a three-day state visit to the United Kingdom. Later the same year she served as escort to the Royal Yacht at Stockholm and Copenhagen and around the Baltic Sea. The ship was diverted to the Mediterranean and proceeded to Suez, where she took part in the hostilities. In 1958 she conducted her first refit, losing her after torpedo tubes in the process and by July 1959 she was back in the Mediterranean – Able Seaman James Simpson of Defender is buried at Kalkara Naval Cemetery in Malta.

From 1963 to 1965 Defender was refitted for the second and last time, losing the forward torpedo tubes and gaining the Type 903 fire-control radar. HMS Defender was alongside in Barbados 30 November 1966 for the Independence ceremony.The Duke & Duchess of Kent represented the Queen. The day before Christmas Eve in 1966, the ship sailed from Bermuda she was deployed to St Vincent in the Caribbean as a precaution during a period of anticipated political unrest. The next year she was east of Suez again, providing anti-submarine cover for the task force withdrawal from Aden, and then remaining in the Far East until 1969.

== Decommissioning and disposal ==
In 1969 Defender was decommissioned and listed for disposal. She spent her last days in the Firth of Forth as a target ship before being sold for breaking.

== Commanding officers ==
From	To	Captain
1953	1953	Captain R F T Stannard OBE DSC RN
1954	1955	Captain Joseph Charles Cameron Henley RN (later Rear Admiral Sir Joseph Henley KCVO CB)
1956	1958	Captain P G Sharp RN
1958	1958	Lieutenant Commander C L Jordan RN
1959	1960	Captain Geoffrey Harry Carew-Hunt RN (later Rear Admiral Carew-Hunt CB)
1965	1966	Commander J R S Gerard-Pearse RN
1966	1967	Commander JD Straker RN
1967	1970	Commander G M F Vallings RN (later Vice Admiral Sir George Vallings KCB)

== Appearance in the Media ==
Defender appeared in the 1961 Rank Organisation Look at Life film "Pipeline". She is seen conducting a replenishment at sea with an unidentified Royal Fleet Auxiliary tanker, most likely to have been a Sprite class tanker. She appeared alongside HMS Saintes.
