= Robert Stannard (Royal Navy officer) =

Captain Robert Stannard CBE DSC
- Born: 20 February 1910
- Died: 10 January 1969 (aged 58); Southwark, London
- Military career
- Allegiance: United Kingdom
- Branch: Royal Navy
- Rank: Captain
- Commands: HMS Defender
- Conflicts: Second World War
- Awards: Commander of the Order of the British Empire; Distinguished Service Cross

Robert Frederick Thomas Stannard (20 February 1910 – 10 January 1969) was a Royal Navy officer who served as director of the London Communications Security Agency in the late 1950s and throughout the 1960s.

== Naval career ==
Stannard served in Second World War as signal communications officer to Flag Officer Fleet Train (a fleet of tankers, supply ships and repair ships) in the British Pacific Fleet and saw action in that capacity during the Battle of Okinawa in Spring 1945. He went on to become executive officer in the battleship HMS Vanguard after the war and commanding officer of the destroyer HMS Defender in 1953 before retiring from the Royal Navy in 1955.

In retirement Stannard became deputy director of the London Communications Security Agency in 1955 and director of the agency in 1957: he remained in post as the agency evolved into CESG and finally stood down when it formally merged with GCHQ in 1969. He was appointed a Commander of the Order of the British Empire on 8 June 1963.

== Sources ==
- Kent, Barrie (2004). Signal!: A History of Signalling in the Royal Navy. Permanent Publications. ISBN 978-1856230254.

Government offices
Preceded by Ronald Penney	Director of the London Communications Security Agency; 1957–1969	Succeeded by Post disbanded
