= John Gerard-Pearse =

Royal Navy Rear Admiral (1924 - 2017)

Rear-Admiral John Gerard-Pearse CB
- Born: 10 May 1924
- Died: 22 May 2017 (aged 93)
- Military career
- Allegiance: United Kingdom
- Branch: Royal Navy
- Service years: 1943–1979
- Rank: Rear-Admiral
- Commands: HMS Tumult; HMS Grafton; HMS Defender; HMS Fearless; HMS Ark Royal
- Conflicts: Second World War
- Awards: Companion of the Order of the Bath

Rear-Admiral John Roger Southey Gerard-Pearse CB (10 May 1924 – 22 May 2017) was a Royal Navy officer who served as Flag Officer Sea Training.

== Naval career ==
Educated at Clifton College, Gerard-Pearse joined the Royal Navy in 1943 during the Second World War. He was given command of the destroyer HMS Tumult, the frigate HMS Grafton and then the destroyer HMS Defender in the early 1960s. He went on to be Captain of the Fishery Protection Squadron in June 1966, before becoming commanding officer of the landing platform dock HMS Fearless in April 1969 and then of the aircraft carrier HMS Ark Royal in November 1973. After that he became Flag Officer Sea Training in April 1975 and Assistant Chief of the Naval Staff (Operations) in February 1977 before retiring in 1979.

Gerard-Pearse was appointed a Companion of the Order of the Bath in the 1979 New Year Honours. He died on 22 May 2017.

Military offices
Preceded by James Eberle	Flag Officer Sea Training; 1975–1976	Succeeded by Gwynedd Pritchard
