= 1st Armoured Reconnaissance Brigade =

- Active: 1940 – 26 November 1940
- Country: United Kingdom
- Allegiance: United Kingdom
- Branch: British Army
- Type: Armoured
- Size: Brigade
- Part of: RAC
- Engagements: Battle of France

Commanders
- Notable commanders: Brigadier C.W. Norman

The 1st Armoured Reconnaissance Brigade was a regular British Army unit during the Second World War.

== History ==
Formed in France in 1940 from the RAC Regiments from the regular divisions. The brigade saw action during the Battle of France. On 26 November 1940 it was converted into the 27th Armoured Brigade.

== Order of Battle ==
The Order of battle of the brigade during the war was: (day/month/year), units in order of precedence.

- 4th/7th Royal Dragoon Guards 18/6/40–25/11/40
- 13th/18th Royal Hussars 18/6/40–25/11/40
- The Fifeshire and Forfarshire Yeomanry (Dragoons) 7/4/40–17/6/40
- East Riding of Yorkshire Yeomanry (Lancers) 30/4/40–25/11/40

== See also ==
- British Armoured formations of World War II
- List of British brigades of the Second World War
