= Edmund Charles Beard =

British Army officer

Major-General Edmund Charles Beard CB CBE MC
- Beard in 1953
- Born: 21 April 1894; Terenure, Dublin, Ireland
- Died: 20 January 1974 (aged 79)
- Military career
- Allegiance: United Kingdom
- Branch: British Army
- Service years: 1914–1946
- Rank: Major-General
- Nickname: "Paddy"
- Service number: 9698
- Units: Royal Irish Regiment; South Lancashire Regiment; Duke of Wellington's Regiment
- Commands: Poona Area (1943–1946); 133rd Infantry Brigade (1940–1942); 1st Battalion, Duke of Wellington's Regiment (1939)
- Conflicts: First World War; Second World War
- Awards: Companion of the Order of the Bath; Commander of the Order of the British Empire; Military Cross; Mentioned in Despatches

Major-General Edmund Charles Beard, CB, CBE, MC (21 April 1894 – 20 January 1974) was a British Army officer during the First and Second World Wars and in 1946 was aide-de-camp to the king, George VI.

== Military career ==
Educated at Marlborough and Oxford University, Beard was commissioned in the Royal Irish Regiment in 1914. He served in the First World War at Gallipoli and in Salonika, Palestine and in France. He was Mentioned in Despatches, wounded, and in April 1918 was awarded the Military Cross in 1917.

Beard transferred to the Prince of Wales's Volunteers in 1922. He was a staff captain in India for the next four years and returned to the United Kingdom to attended the Staff College, Camberley, which he did from 1927 to 1928. He served on the staff of Southern Command and then became brigade major with the 9th Infantry Brigade in 1930 and then from 1933 served on the staff at the War Office. He transferred to the Duke of Wellington's Regiment (DWR) in 1937 and succeeded William Ozanne in command of the 1st Battalion, DWR in 1939.

Beard became assistant adjutant and quartermaster general with the 44th (Home Counties) Division in France with the British Expeditionary Force. He became commander of the 133rd Infantry Brigade in England in 1940 and, promoted on 1 October 1940, with seniority backdated to 1 July 1938, to colonel, became Brigadier General Staff Home Forces in 1942. Promoted to major general in 1942, he held an area command in India until 1946 when he retired from the army.

Beard was Colonel of the South Lancashire Regiment from 1948 to 1957 and his eldest son was killed in action in Nalaya in 1952.

Beard's portrait as a major general is in the National Portrait Gallery in London

== Bibliography ==
- Smart, Nick (2005). Biographical Dictionary of British Generals of the Second World War. Barnsley, South Yorkshire: Pen and Sword Books. ISBN 1844150496.

Honorary titles
Preceded by Sir Douglas Baird	Colonel of the South Lancashire Regiment; 1948–1957	Succeeded by Joseph Henry Whalley-Kelly
