= Christopher Woolner =

British Army officer

Major-General Christopher Woolner CB MC & Two Bars
- Born: 18 October 1893; Kensington, London, England
- Died: 10 January 1984 (aged 90); Ashford, Kent, England
- Military career
- Allegiance: United Kingdom
- Branch: British Army
- Service years: 1912–1947
- Rank: Major-General
- Nickname: "Kit"
- Service number: 5491
- Unit: Royal Engineers
- Commands: 53rd (Welsh) Infantry Division; 81st (West Africa) Division; 8th Infantry Brigade; 64th Field Company, Royal Engineers
- Conflicts: First World War; Second World War
- Awards: Companion of the Order of the Bath; Military Cross & Two Bars; Mentioned in despatches (5)

Major-General Christopher Geoffrey Woolner, CB, MC & Two Bars (18 October 1893 – 10 January 1984) was a senior British Army officer who served in the First World War and Second World War.

== Military service ==
Born on 18 October 1893 in Kensington, London, England, Christopher Woolner was educated at Marlborough College and the Royal Military Academy, Woolwich. He was commissioned as a second lieutenant into the Royal Engineers on 21 December 1912. Among his fellow graduates were Ivor Thomas, William Morgan, Douglas McConnel and William Mirrlees, all future generals.

He first saw active service in the First World War, which began in August 1914, on the Western Front. Over the course of the war he was mentioned in despatches twice, wounded once and received the Military Cross and two Bars for gallantry and leadership. The citation for his MC reads:

For conspicuous gallantry and resource on the afternoon of 26th September, 1915. Some new troops holding a corner of "Fosse 8" were shaken by heavy shell fire, and, believing that the enemy were holding the Slag Heap in their rear, were on the point of retiring, when Lieutenant Woolner rallied them, and, collecting two sections of his own company, charged to the top of the Slag Heap and restored' confidence. A retirement at this point would have been very serious.

From October 1917 to July 1918 Woolner, promoted on 4 December 1914 to lieutenant, was commanding officer (CO) of the 64th Field Company, Royal Engineers.

Between the wars, Woolner served with the Royal Engineers in Gold Coast, Woolwich, India and Chatham. He attended the Staff College, Camberley from 1927 to 1928.

In 1939 he was Deputy Inspector and deputy commandant of the Royal School of Military Engineering and during the Second World War Woolner served as a staff officer with the British Expeditionary Force (BEF) during the Battle of France before becoming commander of the 8th Infantry Brigade. For his services in France and Belgium he was twice mentioned in despatches. He was promoted to the acting rank of major general on 30 November 1940. His major general's rank was made permanent on 1 October 1941. From 1941 to 1943, he was general officer commanding (GOC) Sierra Leone & Gambia and in June 1942 was made a Companion of the Order of the Bath in 1942. Between March and August 1943 he served as GOC of the 81st (West Africa) Division. He then served as commander of the West Midlands District in the United Kingdom until the end of the war.

In 1947, Woolner was GOC 53rd (Welsh) Infantry Division until his retirement in November 1947 with the rank of major general.

== Bibliography ==
- Smart, Nick (2005). Biographical Dictionary of British Generals of the Second World War. Barnesley: Pen & Sword. ISBN 1844150496.

Military offices
New command	GOC 81st (West Africa) Division; 1943–1944	Succeeded by Frederick Loftus-Tottenham
Preceded by Philip Balfour	GOC 53rd (Welsh) Infantry Division; January–August 1947	Succeeded by George Wood
