= Stanley Kirby =

British Army officer

Major-General Stanley Kirby CB CMG CIE OBE MC*
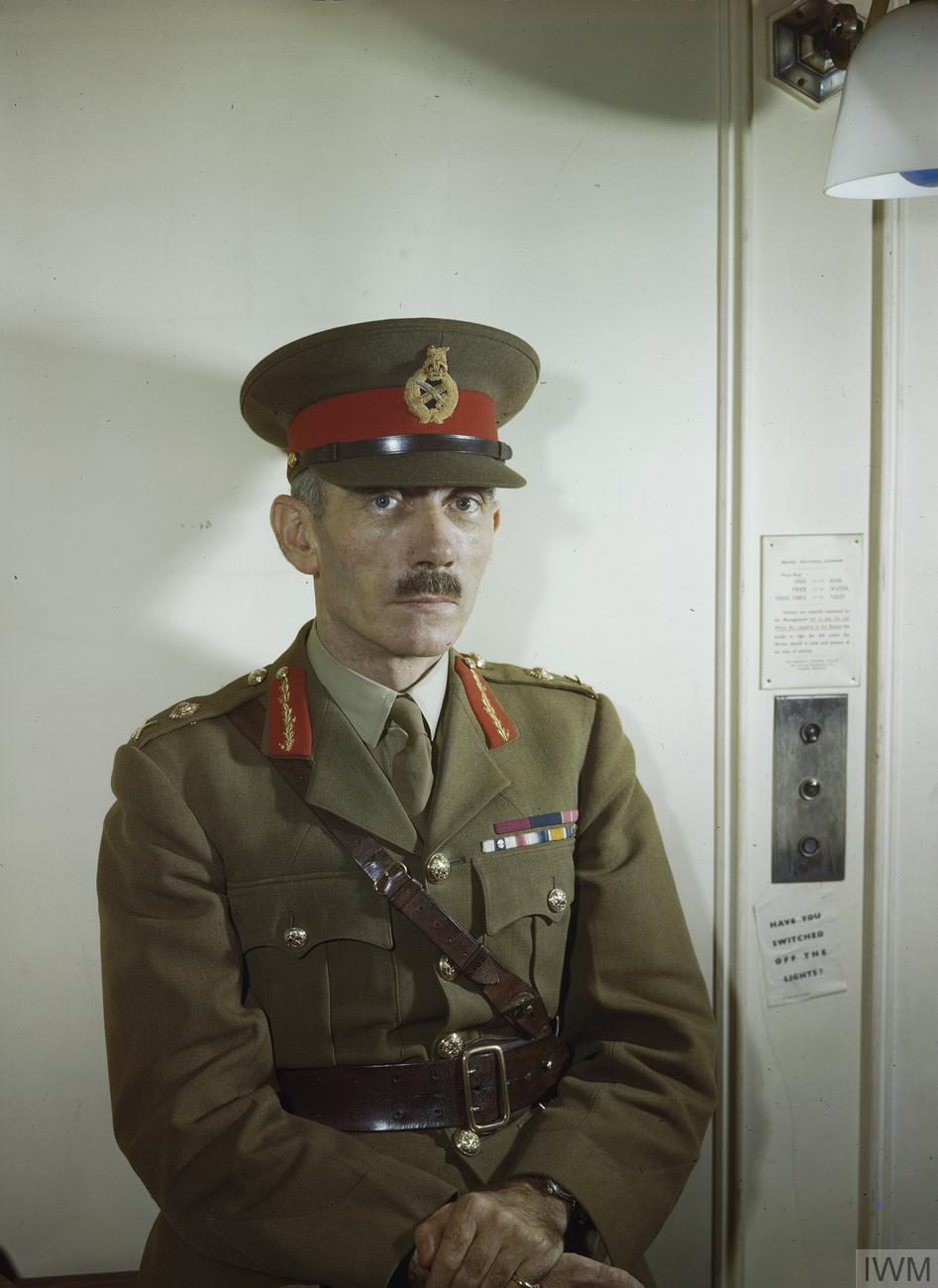
- Born: 13 February 1895; Hendon, Middlesex, England
- Died: 19 July 1968 (aged 73); Minchinhampton, Gloucestershire, England
- Military career
- Allegiance: United Kingdom
- Branch: British Army
- Service years: 1914–1945
- Rank: Major-General
- Service number: 8398
- Unit: Royal Engineers
- Conflicts: First World War; Second World War
- Awards: Companion of the Order of the Bath; Companion of the Order of St Michael and St George; Companion of the Order of the Indian Empire; Officer of the Order of the British Empire; Military Cross & Bar; Mentioned in Despatches; Grand Officer of the Order of Orange-Nassau (Netherlands); Commander of the Legion of Merit (United States); Commander of the Order of the Crown (Belgium)

Major-General Stanley Woodburn Kirby, CB, CMG, CIE, OBE, MC & Bar (13 February 1895 − 19 July 1968) was a British Army officer who served in both World Wars.

== Personal ==
Stanley Kirby was the son of Sir Woodburn Kirby, born in the Hendon district of London. He was educated at Charterhouse School. Kirby was married twice; first in 1924 to Rosabel Gell who died in 1954 – the couple had one son. His second marriage was in 1955 to Mrs Joan Catherine.

== Military career ==
Kirby was commissioned into the Royal Engineers on 17 July 1914 and served during the First World War in Egypt (1915), France (21 February to 21 October 1915) and Macedonia (1 December 1915 to 7 September 1917). He was mentioned in despatches and awarded the Military Cross and Bar and finished the war as a captain. He was Assistant Instructor in Survey, School of Military Engineering from 24 May 1920 until 15 July 1923 and served in Singapore between 1923 and 1926. He studied at the Staff College, Camberley from 1927 to 1928. From 9 February 1931 until 18 February 1935, he served as a General Staff Officer at the Directorate of Military Operations and Intelligence, War Office, starting as a General Staff Officer, 3rd grade (GSO3) and then as 2nd grade (GSO2), an appointment he relinquished in January 1935.

Kirby studied at the Imperial Defence College in 1936. From October 1937 until 1943, Kirby served at General Headquarters, India, first as Assistant Master-General of Ordnance, then as Deputy Master-General of Ordnance (from 13 March 1940). He was promoted while there to colonel on 1 July 1938, with seniority backdated to 10 October 1937 and was director of staff duties from 1 October 1941 and became deputy chief of the general staff, India, in 1942. Kirby returned to Britain and he was appointed as director of civil affairs, at the War Office in June 1943, until April 1944. In 1945, he was deputy chief of staff (organisation), British Element, Control Commission for Germany. Working as a historian from 1950, he was a joint author of The War Against Japan, the volumes in the official history series History of the Second World War on the war in the Far East.

== Honours ==
Kirby was appointed an Officer of the Order of the British Empire (OBE) in the 1927 Birthday Honours, a Companion of the Order of the Indian Empire (CIE) in 1940, a Companion of the Order of the Bath (CB) in the 1943 Birthday Honours, and a Companion of the Order of St Michael and St George (CMG) in the 1947 New Year Honours. In 1948 he was appointed a Commander of the US Legion of Merit.

== Bibliography ==
- Smart, Nick (2005). Biographical Dictionary of British Generals of the Second World War. Barnsley: Pen & Sword. ISBN 978-1-84-415049-6.
