= John Archibald Mulhall =

British colonial administrator (1899-1971)

John Archibald Mulhall CMG OBE
- Born: 19 July 1899
- Died: 16 April 1971 (aged 71)
- Education: University College, London
- Occupation: Colonial civil servant

John Archibald Mulhall CMG OBE (19 July 1899 – 16 April 1971) was a British colonial civil servant in British Ceylon and the Gold Coast.

== Early life and education ==
Mulhall was born on 19 July 1899, the son of Robert Mulhall of Southampton. He was educated at University College, London (BSc). He served in the First World War, from 1916 to 1918, in the 8th City of London Regiment.

== Career ==
Mulhall joined the Ceylon Civil Service as a cadet in 1921. He served in various administrative posts in Ceylon including in succession: Assistant in the Kacheries of Kalatara, Puttalam, Badulla, Galle, and Anuradhapura (1921–1927); Assistant Colonial Secretary (1928); Assistant Chief Secretary (1931); Secretary of the Retrenchment Commission (1932); Assistant Chief Secretary (1933); Acting Department Chief Secretary (1943); Secretary to the Commander-in-Chief, Ceylon (1943), and Secretary to the Governor-General of Ceylon (1948).

In 1957, Mulhall served as chairman of the Public Service Commission in the Gold Coast, and the same year, was involved in the establishment of a Public Service Commission in Cyprus. He retired in 1957.

== Publications ==
- The Public Service Commission in Overseas Territories (1962)

== Personal life and death ==
Mulhall married Eleanor Webb in 1936. They had no children.

Mulhall died on 16 April 1971, aged 71.

== Honours ==
Mulhall was appointed Office of the Order of the British Empire (OBE) in 1947, and was appointed Companion of the Order of St Michael and St George (CMG) in the 1953 Coronation Honours.
