= Uganda World War Cemeteries =

CWGC cemeteries in Uganda

The Uganda World War Cemeteries are cemeteries in Uganda housing the remains of the soldiers who died during World War I and World War II. The cemeteries are managed by the Commonwealth War Graves Commission. There are four World War cemeteries in Uganda, located in Tororo, Jinja, Entebbe, and Kampala.

== Kampala World War Cemetery ==
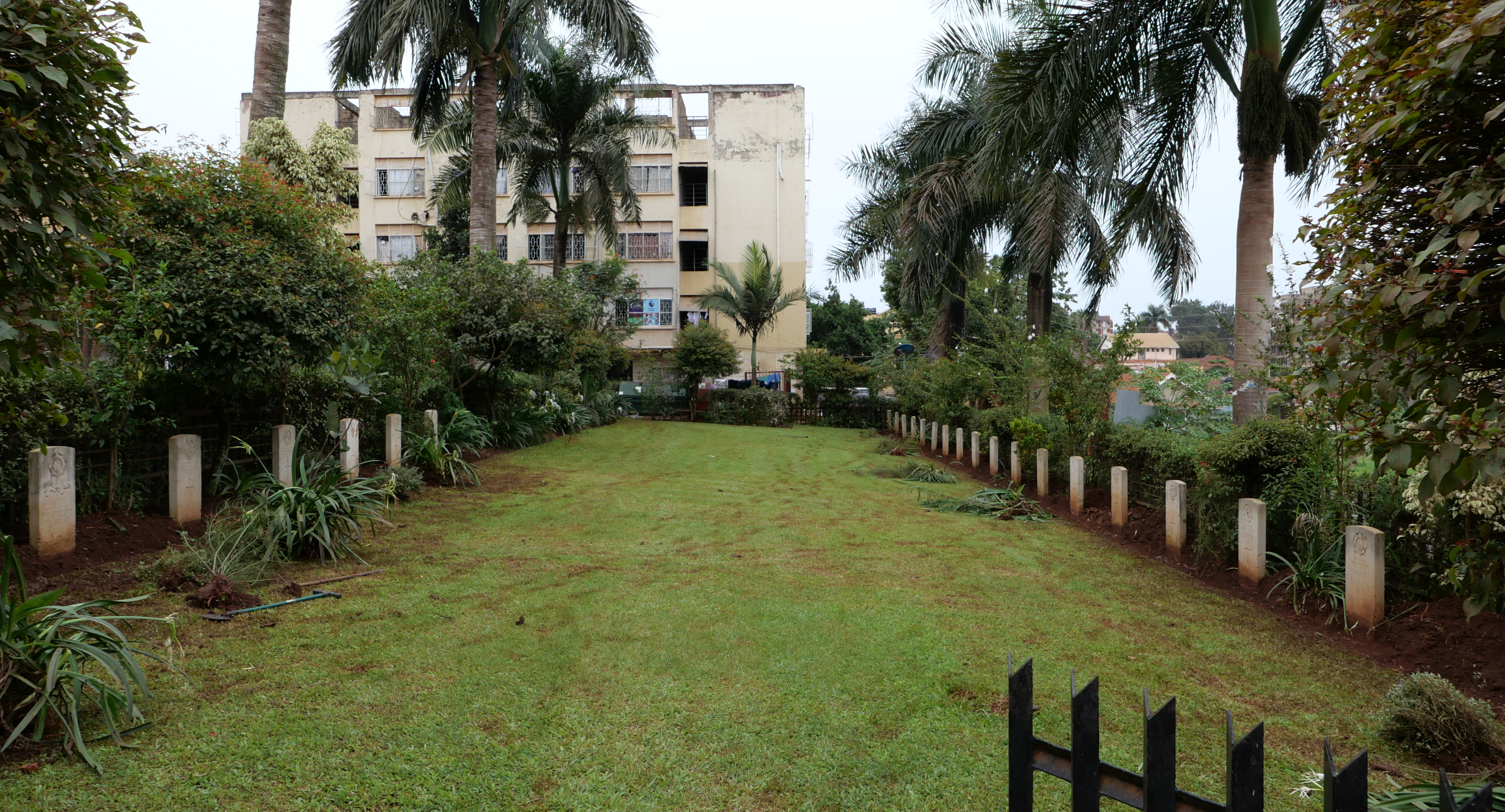
The Nakawa Road Cemetery in 2024.

The Kampala World War Cemetery—better known as the Nakawa Road Cemetery—is one of two Commonwealth World War Graves Commission cemeteries located in Kampala, Uganda.

It has 26 Commonwealth burials from World War II, including 19 soldiers from the East African Forces. Some members of the Uganda Police are also buried there. The Commonwealth War Graves Commission also cares for a war grave of an African soldier who served in the Force Publique of the Belgian Congo and died in 1942.

== Tororo World War Cemetery ==
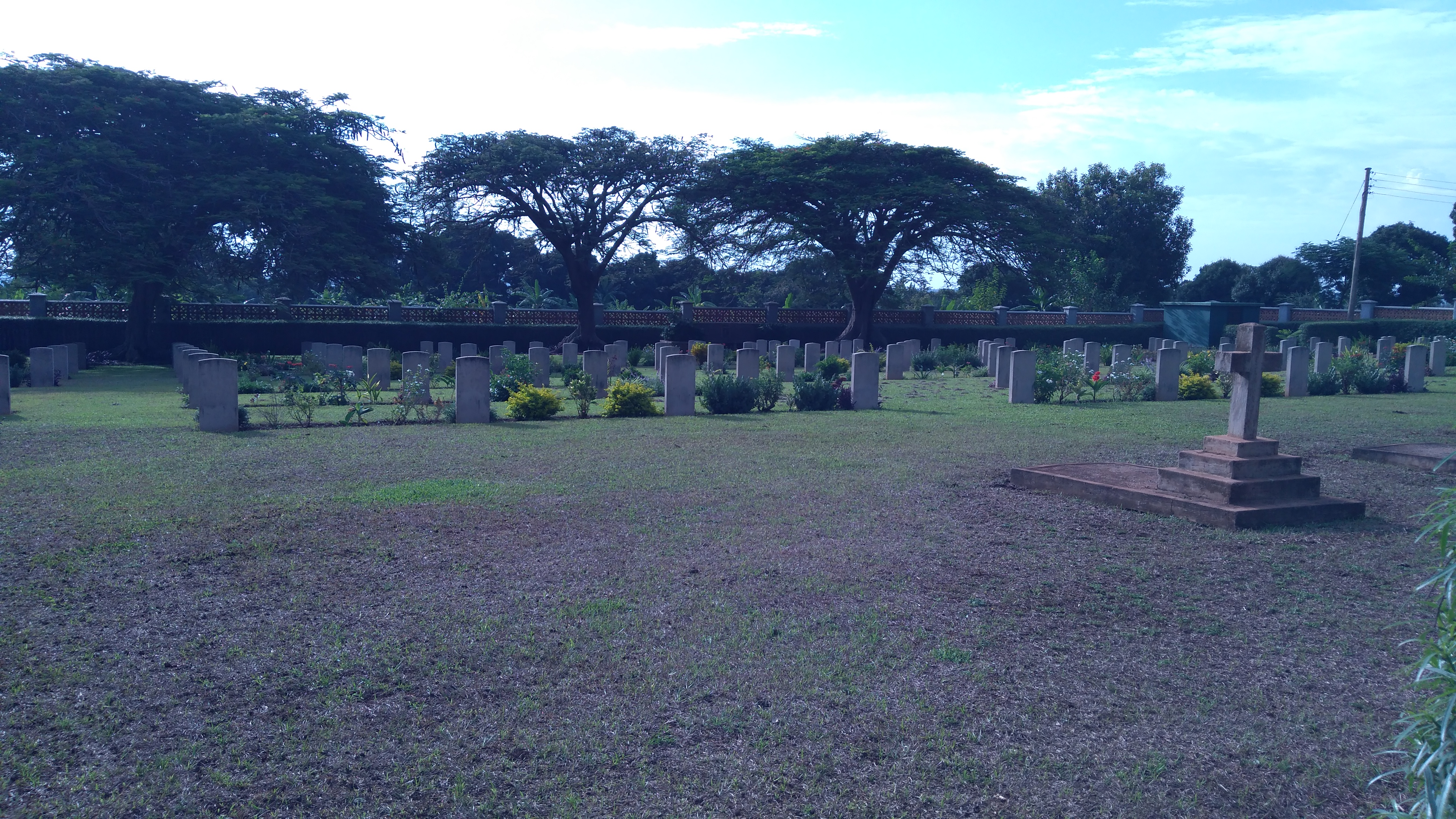
Commonwealth War Graves Tororo Cemetery

The Tororo World War Cemetery is along the Tororo-Bugiri highway, and has an area of 150 square meters. The cemetery has 159 Commonwealth burials of the World War II and one burial from the World War I.

== Entebbe World War Cemetery ==
The Entebbe World War Cemetery is in Entebbe, Uganda. The cemetery has 4 Commonwealth burials.

== Jinja World War Cemetery ==
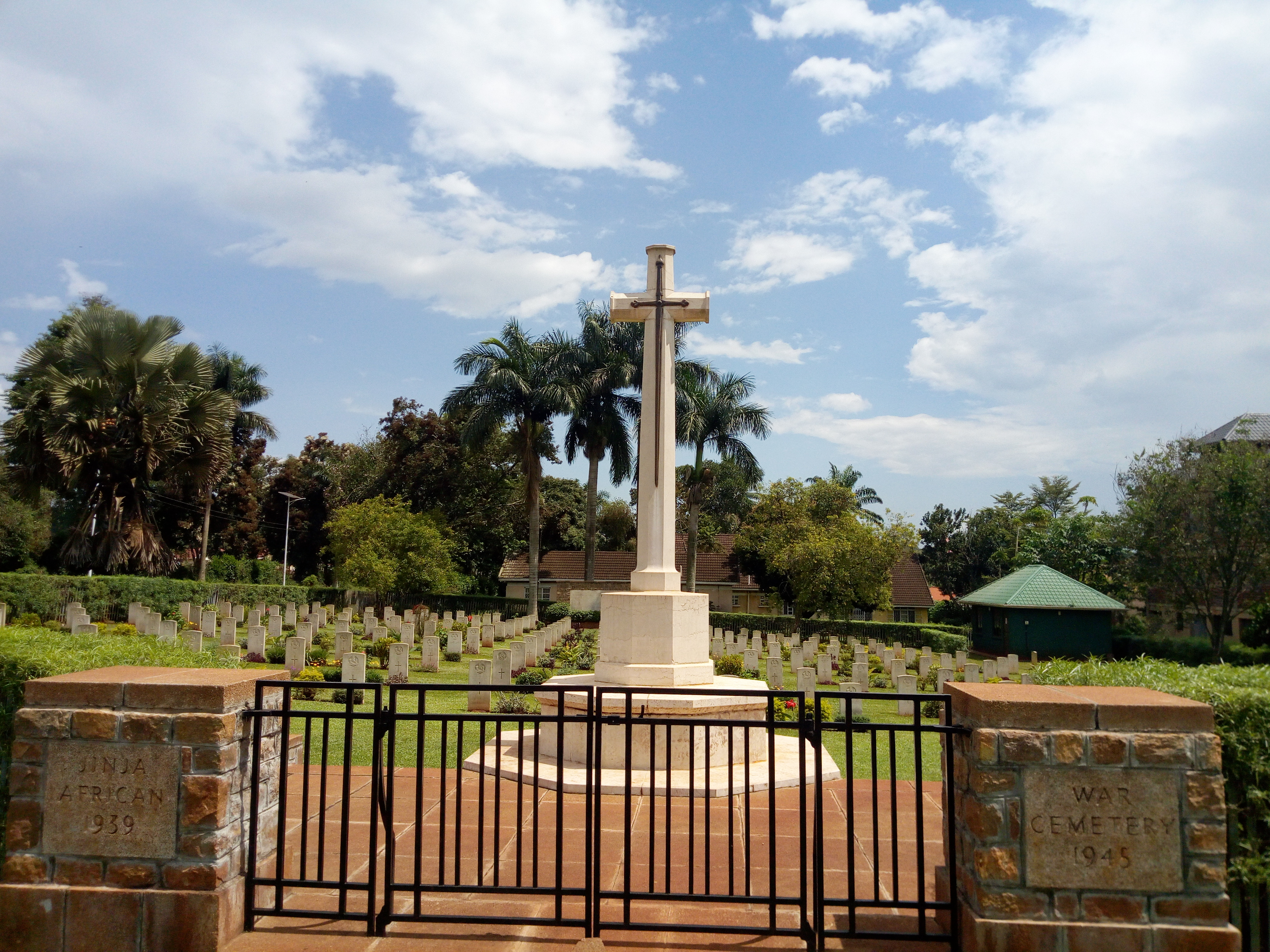
Jinja War Cemetery

The Jinja World War Cemetery is in Jinja, Uganda. It has one burial from the World War I and 179 burials and commemorations from World War II. Two of the burials are unidentified, and one soldier is commemorated by a special memorial. The cemetery also contains four post-war service graves. The cemetery also includes the Jinja Memorial, which commemorates 127 men of the East African Forces who died during the World War II but whose graves were situated such that maintenance for all time could not be assured.
