= Neil Ritchie =

British Army officer (1897–1983)

General Sir Neil Ritchie GBE KCB DSO MC KStJ
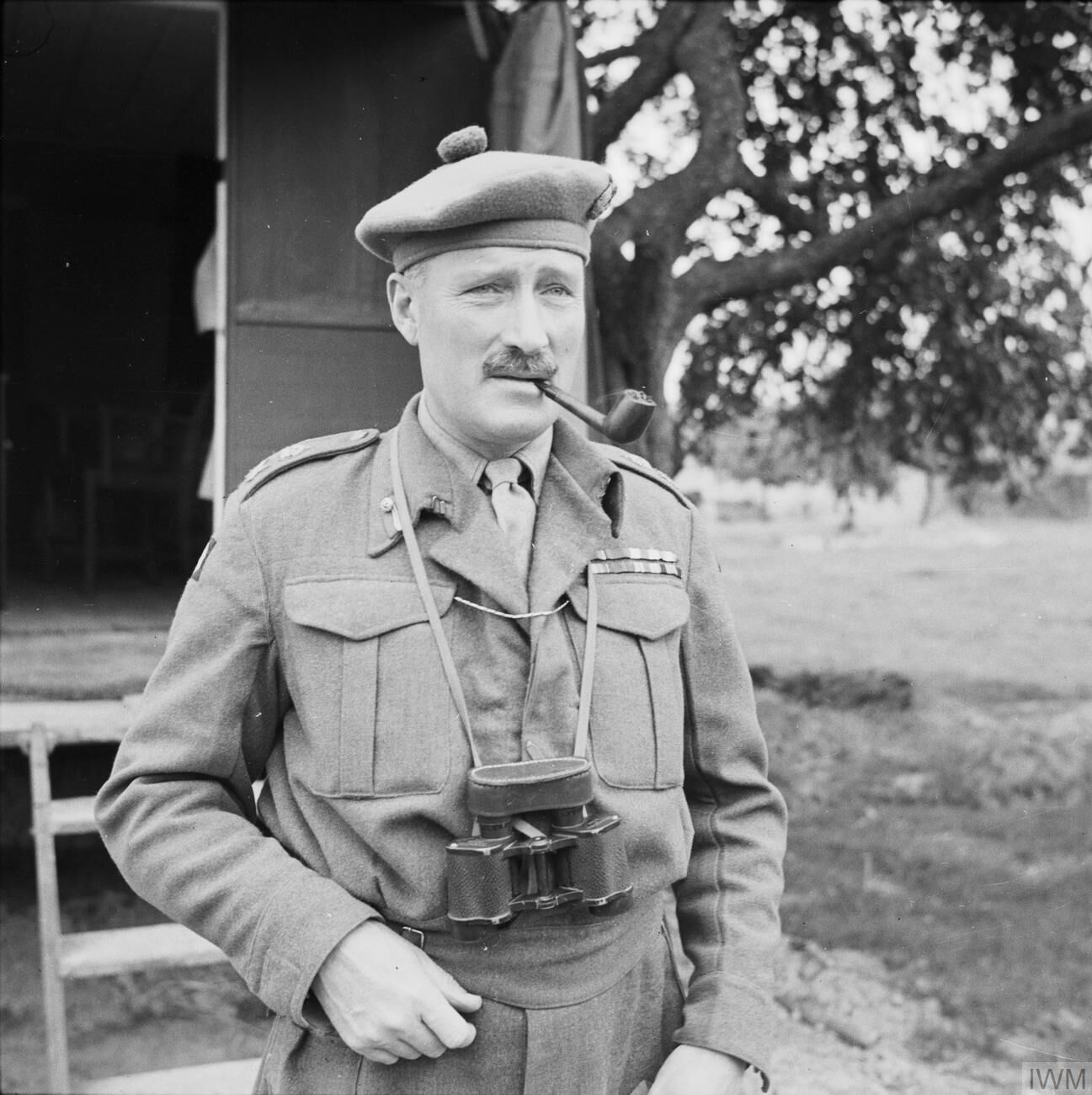
- Ritchie in 1944
- Born: 29 July 1897; British Guiana
- Died: 11 December 1983 (aged 86); Toronto, Ontario, Canada
- Relatives: Brigadier General Alan MacDougall Ritchie (brother)
- Military career
- Allegiance: United Kingdom
- Branch: British Army
- Service years: 1914–1951
- Rank: General
- Service number: 9334
- Units: Black Watch (Royal Highlanders); King's Own Royal Regiment (Lancaster)
- Commands: Far East Land Forces (1947–1948); Scottish Command (1945–1947); XII Corps (1943–1945); 52nd (Lowland) Infantry Division (1942–1943); Eighth Army (1941–1942); 51st (Highland) Infantry Division (1940–1941); 2nd Battalion, King's Own Royal Regiment (Lancaster) (1938–1939)
- Conflicts: First World War; Western Front; Battle of Loos; Mesopotamian campaign; Capture of Baghdad; Battle of Istabulat; Sinai and Palestine campaign; Battle of Sharon; Occupation of the Rhineland; Arab revolt in Palestine; Second World War; Western Desert campaign; Operation Crusader; Battle of Gazala; North West Europe campaign; Battle of Normandy; Operation Plunder; Allied invasion of Germany; Malayan Emergency
- Awards: Knight Grand Cross of the Order of the British Empire; Knight Commander of the Order of the Bath; Companion of the Distinguished Service Order; Military Cross; Mentioned in Despatches (5); Commander of the Legion of Merit (United States); Knight Grand Officer of the Order of Orange-Nassau with Swords (Netherlands); Silver Cross of the Virtuti Militari (Poland); Commander of the Legion of Honour (France); Croix de guerre (France)
- Other work: Chairman of an insurance company; Colonel of the Black Watch (Royal Highland Regiment) (1950–1952)

General Sir Neil Methuen Ritchie, GBE, KCB, DSO, MC, KStJ (29 July 1897 – 11 December 1983) was a British Army officer who served in the First and Second World Wars. During the Second World War he commanded the British Eighth Army in the North African campaign from November 1941 until he was dismissed in June 1942 after a disastrous defeat in the Battle of Gazala.

A 1914 graduate of the Royal Military College, Sandhurst, Ritchie was commissioned into the Black Watch (Royal Highlanders). During the First World War he served on the Western Front, in the Mesopotamian campaign, where he was appointed a Companion of the Distinguished Service Order, and in the Sinai and Palestine campaign, where he was awarded the Military Cross. Between the wars he participated in the Occupation of the Rhineland, attended the Staff College, Camberley, and commanded a battalion in Palestine during the Arab revolt.

During the Second World War he served with the British Expeditionary Force in the Battle of France in 1940 as the Brigadier General Staff of II Corps, commanded by Lieutenant-General Sir Alan Brooke. Although Ritchie's career looked finished after Gazala, he was given command of XII Corps, which he led throughout the campaign in North West Europe, from June 1944 until Victory in Europe Day in May 1945.

After the war he was given the Scottish Command and was Governor of Edinburgh Castle from 1945 to 1947. He commanded Far East Land Forces from 1947 to 1949 and led the Joint Services Mission in Washington, DC, from 1949 until his retirement in 1951. Afterwards he emigrated to Canada, where he pursued a career in business.

== Early life ==
Neil Methuen Ritchie was born in Essequibo, British Guiana, on 29 July 1897, the third child of a Scottish planter, Dugald MacDougall Ritchie, and his wife Anna Catherine Leggatt. He had an older brother and sister, and a younger sister. His brother Alan MacDougall Ritchie became a brigadier in the British Army. His father's sugar cane business was ruined by a crop disease, and the family moved to British Malaya, where he established a rubber plantation. Ritchie was educated at Lancing College, a boarding school, and the Royal Military College, Sandhurst.

== First World War ==
After the outbreak of the First World War in August 1914, Ritchie passed out from Sandhurst on 16 December and was, at the age of 17, commissioned as a second lieutenant in the Black Watch (Royal Highlanders). Among his fellow cadets was another future general, John Grover. As he was too young, Ritchie was not sent overseas until 18 May 1915. He served initially on the Western Front with the 1st Battalion, Black Watch, one of the two Regular Army battalions in the regiment, which was then part of the 1st Brigade of the 1st Division. He was wounded during the Battle of Loos on 26 September, and was promoted to lieutenant on 2 October while he was in hospital.

After recovering from his injuries, Ritchie was promoted to the temporary rank of captain on 2 March 1916, and made an acting captain on 22 April. He joined the 2nd Battalion, the other Regular Army battalion in the regiment, which was part of the 21st (Bareilly) Brigade in the 7th (Meerut) Division, a British Indian Army division, serving in the Middle East in the Mesopotamian campaign. He was designated acting battalion adjutant on 24 April, and he was confirmed in the role on 5 January 1917. The battalion participated in the capture of Baghdad in March, and was one of the first units to enter the city. It then fought in the Battle of Istabulat on 21 April. Ritchie contracted paratyphoid and was evacuated to Bombay. For his services in Mesopotamia, he was mentioned in despatches. He was made a Companion of the Distinguished Service Order on 25 August, and promoted to the substantive rank of captain on 19 November.

Ritchie rejoined the 2nd Battalion in December and resumed his role of adjutant. In late December the 7th (Meerut) Division was sent to Palestine to participate in the Sinai and Palestine campaign. Ritchie was awarded the Military Cross on 15 February 1919 for his actions during the Battle of Sharon on 19 September 1918. His citation read:

During the action against the Turkish Tabsor position on September 19th, 1918, and during the subsequent advance, he was invariably to the fore and set a fine example of coolness, courage and utter disregard of danger. When the regiment occupied the El Medjel position on the evening of September 19th, 1918, Capt. Ritchie carried a Lewis gun up part of the way as its carrier was exhausted, and thereby materially assisted in driving off an enemy picquet which was holding up the attack on top of the hill. His services throughout the two attacks, and the subsequent trying marches, were of inestimable value to the regiment.

== Between the wars ==
Ritchie remained in the army during the interwar period. The 2nd Battalion returned to Scotland in 1919. In 1920, it joined the Occupation of the Rhineland, stationed at Marienburg, a suburb of Cologne. Among the other officers in the 2nd Battalion at this time was Major Archibald Wavell, who commanded one of its companies. Ritchie continued to serve as adjutant until 28 February 1921, when he returned to the regimental depot in Perth, Scotland, in command of a training company. Although he enjoyed the lifestyle of a regular army officer, with plenty of opportunities for shooting, fishing and dancing, he found it hard to make ends meet on a captain's salary, and considered leaving the army; Wavell counselled him to remain. From 18 July 1923 until 5 October 1927, Ritchie served under Wavell as a General Staff Officer Grade 3 (GSO3) at the War Office. Ritchie attended the Staff College, Camberley, as a student from 1929 to 1930.

On completion of the staff college course, Ritchie returned to his regiment, which was now serving at Meerut in British India. He was a General Staff Officer Grade 2 (GSO2) with Northern Command, India, from 2 April 1933 until 2 April 1937. While there he was promoted for the first time in almost sixteen years, to brevet major on 1 July 1933, followed by substantive major on 2 June 1934, and brevet lieutenant colonel on 1 January 1936. He encountered Brigadier Claude Auchinleck, who commanded the Peshawar Brigade in the region. On 4 December 1937, Ritchie married Catherine Taylor of Kingston, Ontario, Canada, the daughter of James Arnott Minnes, a partner in a warehousing firm, in Chelsea, London. They had a son and a daughter.

On 3 January 1938 Ritchie transferred from the Black Watch, which by now he had been with for just over twenty-three years, to the King's Own Royal Regiment (Lancaster), and was promoted to lieutenant colonel. He became commanding officer of the 2nd Battalion, King's Own, on the same date. In September the battalion was sent to Palestine to perform internal security duties during the Arab revolt. He commanded the battalion until August 1939, shortly before the Second World War began in September. For his services in Palestine Ritchie was mentioned in despatches. Ritchie returned to England, where he was promoted to colonel on 26 August 1939 (with seniority backdated to 1 January) and became a General Staff Officer Grade 1 (GSO1) at the Senior Officers' School at Sheerness, Kent.

== Second World War ==
=== France and Belgium ===
After being promoted to the acting rank of brigadier on 22 December 1939, Ritchie became the Brigadier General Staff (BGS) of II Corps, commanded by Lieutenant-General Sir Alan Brooke, which was serving in France as part of the British Expeditionary Force (BEF). Ritchie seems to have impressed Brooke, as on 3 January 1940 the latter wrote in his diary that "Ritchie, my new BGS, seems to be turning out well and should, I think, be good". When the so-called "Phoney War" came to an end in May with the German invasion of western Europe, Ritchie further impressed Brooke by controlling the corps headquarters in a calm and confident manner, thus enabling Brooke to concentrate on running the battle on his corps' front.

After being evacuated to England Ritchie was requested by Brooke when the latter was appointed to command a new "Second BEF". Accompanying Brooke to France, Ritchie was sent back to England again after Brooke realised that further efforts to fight the Germans were pointless and, in his words, "I sent Neil Ritchie off home this evening [16 June] as I did not feel that any useful purpose could be served by retaining him any longer". For his services in France and Belgium, Ritchie was made a Commander of the Order of the British Empire in the 1940 Birthday Honours on 11 July, and was mentioned in despatches on 26 July.

=== Service in the United Kingdom ===
Ritchie served under Brooke as BGS of Southern Command until Brooke was appointed Commander-in-Chief, Home Forces, in July 1940. He then served Brooke's successor, Lieutenant-General Claude Auchinleck. At the relatively young age of forty-three, Ritchie received a promotion to the acting rank of major-general on 28 October 1940, with service number 9334, and became General Officer Commanding (GOC) of the 51st (Highland) Infantry Division. Most of the division had been destroyed in France but the decision was taken to reform it by absorbing the 9th (Highland) Infantry Division, the 51st (Highland) Infantry Division's second Line Territorial Army duplicate. Although not a Scot, Ritchie was a good choice for the role, as he had spent much of his career with the Black Watch, which contributed three of the division's nine infantry battalions, and had experience training troops. Brooke was impressed when he visited the division in May 1941.

=== North Africa and the Middle East ===
Ritchie remained with the 51st (Highland) Infantry Division until June 1941, when he was sent to the Middle East, where he served as Deputy Chief of the General Staff (DCGS) to Wavell, the Commander-in-Chief of Middle East Command. Ritchie's acting rank of major-general was made temporary on 28 October. Auchinleck succeeded Wavell as C-in-C Middle East, and gave Ritchie his highest field command, the British Eighth Army, in November, following the dismissal of Lieutenant-General Alan Cunningham during Operation Crusader. Although Ritchie had never commanded a division or corps in battle, he was available, whereas the Eighth Army's corps commanders, Lieutenant Generals Willoughby Norrie and Reade Godwin-Austen were fighting a battle, and other prospects were outside the theatre and unfamiliar with the situation. He was promoted to the acting rank of lieutenant general on 27 November. For his period of service in the Middle East from July to October 1941, he was mentioned in despatches.

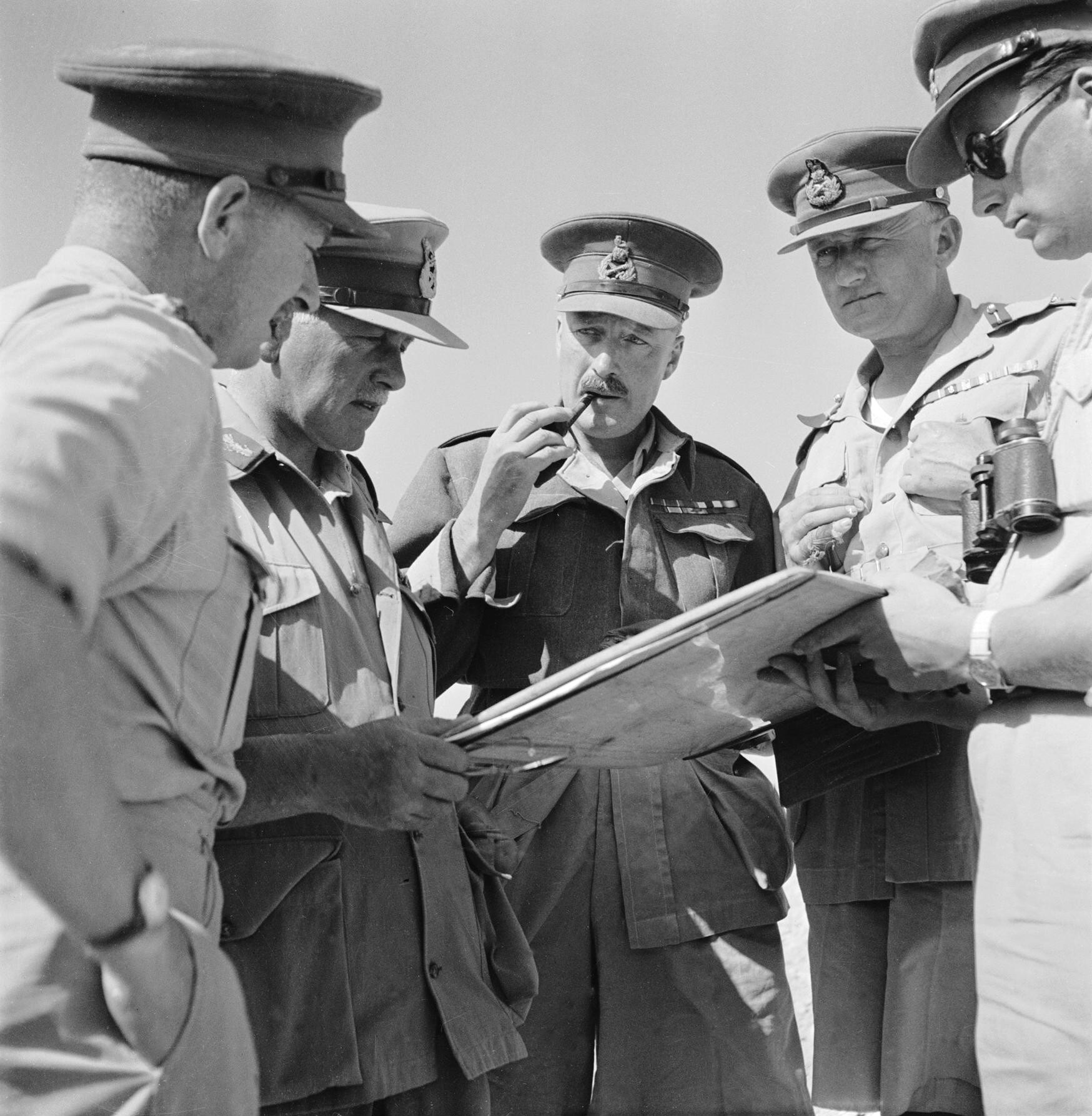
Ritchie (centre, with pipe) addresses other officers in North Africa on 31 May 1942. Also pictured are Willoughby Norrie, William Gott and, with his back facing the camera, George Erskine.

Auchinleck was himself present at Eighth Army headquarters from 1 to 10 December, when the battle was won. The Siege of Tobruk and the German and Italian forces under Generaloberst Erwin Rommel were forced to retreat from Cyrenaica. Auchinleck later wrote that:

Ritchie was perforce pitch-forked into a command at a desperate moment [really desperate], knowing little or nothing of his subordinate commanders or troops and told to retrieve an apparently lost battle. I, therefore, thought it only right to "hold his hand" and make myself very readily available for consultation at short notice.

Ritchie's appointment was originally intended as a temporary one until a suitable commander could be found, but he ended up commanding the Eighth Army for nearly seven months. Auchinleck was satisfied with his performance in Operation Crusader, and thought that it would affect morale to remove another commander, and a victorious one at that, so he retained Ritchie in the post. He was awarded the Polish Silver Cross of the Virtuti Militari for his part in Operation Crusader.

In his book The Desert Generals, Corelli Barnett, a British military historian, wrote that:

[Ritchie] was vigorous and thorough. His personality and appearance made him the image of a British general. Ritchie was very tall and very big. He was handsome and authoritative; goodhumoured in a slightly heavy manner. There was a bovine strength about him. Yet his brain was good. He was liked and trusted. His immediate superior in Cairo, [Lieutenant-]General Sir Arthur Smith, said of him later: "He was straight-forward and absolutely honest. If one could criticise him, he was a little slow — but caution is often better than being too slick."

Victory soon turned to defeat. Rommel struck back on 21 January 1942. At one point Ritchie bypassed Godwin-Austen and countermanded the latter's orders to Major-General Francis Tuker, the commander of the 4th Indian Division. Feeling that Ritchie had by this action displayed a lack of confidence in him, Godwin-Austen tendered his resignation to Auchinleck, which was reluctantly accepted.

Ritchie was in command of the Eighth Army at the Battle of Gazala in May–June 1942, when he failed to exercise strong command over the Army. He lacked experience in handling large formations, particularly armoured ones. His more experienced subordinates, Norrie and William Gott saw him as little more than a mouthpiece for Auchinleck and often ignored or undermined him. Even his division commanders were more experienced. Auchinleck kept him on a short leash, paying frequent visits, sending lengthy instructions and positioning his DCGS, Brigadier Eric Dorman-Smith at Eighth Army headquarters. The British and Commonwealth forces were soundly defeated, resulting in the Axis capture of Tobruk. On 25 June, Ritchie was sacked by Auchinleck, who assumed personal command of the Eighth Army.

Michael Carver, who later served under Ritchie in North-West Europe, and became a field marshal and a military historian, wrote:

He was a good, professional, straightforward soldier. If he had not been, Alanbrooke would not have thought highly of him as his Brigadier General Staff. There is no doubt in my mind that he never recovered from starting off on the wrong foot with Auchinleck - as a chargé d'affaires, not a plenipotentiary. His opportunity to remedy that state of affairs came after the clash with Godwin-Austen in the Msus Stakes of February 1942. It is now clear that it was Auchinleck's intervention that caused the counter-order which led to disorder. Ritchie should then have demanded either that he should be allowed the freedom to command his army in his own way, or be replaced. But he was too decent, loyal and traditional a soldier to put his superior, whom he liked and admired, in such a difficult position. He was to suffer for it. High command in war requires tougher and more ruthless qualities.

=== Return to the United Kingdom ===
After being replaced as the Eighth Army commander Ritchie returned to the United Kingdom. He met with Brooke, who was now the Chief of the Imperial General Staff, at the War Office on 15 July 1942, and Brooke decided to give him a second chance. Brooke later wrote:

Neil Ritchie had done so wonderfully well in France during the fighting leading to Dunkirk, and I had grown so fond of him, that I hated seeing him subjected to this serious reverse. I told him that I considered that he had been pushed on much too fast by Auchinleck, to be put in command of 8th Army in the field when he had never even commanded a division in action. I told him he must regain confidence in himself. To do this he must go back to what he had done so efficiently before, namely the command of a division at home. I told him that when he had regained confidence in himself I would give him a corps.

Ritchie was appointed to command the 52nd (Lowland) Infantry Division on 11 September 1942. The division was a first line Territorial Army formation made up of infantry battalions from all five Scottish Lowland regiments, and at the time was being trained in mountain warfare, in the United Kingdom in preparation for possible operations in Norway. The training took place in the Grampian Mountains and culminated in Exercise Goliath II in October 1943. Judged fit to command a corps, Ritchie relinquished command to Major-General Edmund Hakewill-Smith on 11 November. He was selected to command XII Corps in place of Lieutenant-General Montagu Stopford, who was sent to India. In the 1944 New Year Honours, Ritchie was made a Companion of the Order of the Bath. He became a temporary lieutenant-general and war substantive major-general on 3 April 1944, and a substantive major-general on 19 May, with seniority backdated to 25 December 1943.

=== Northwest Europe ===
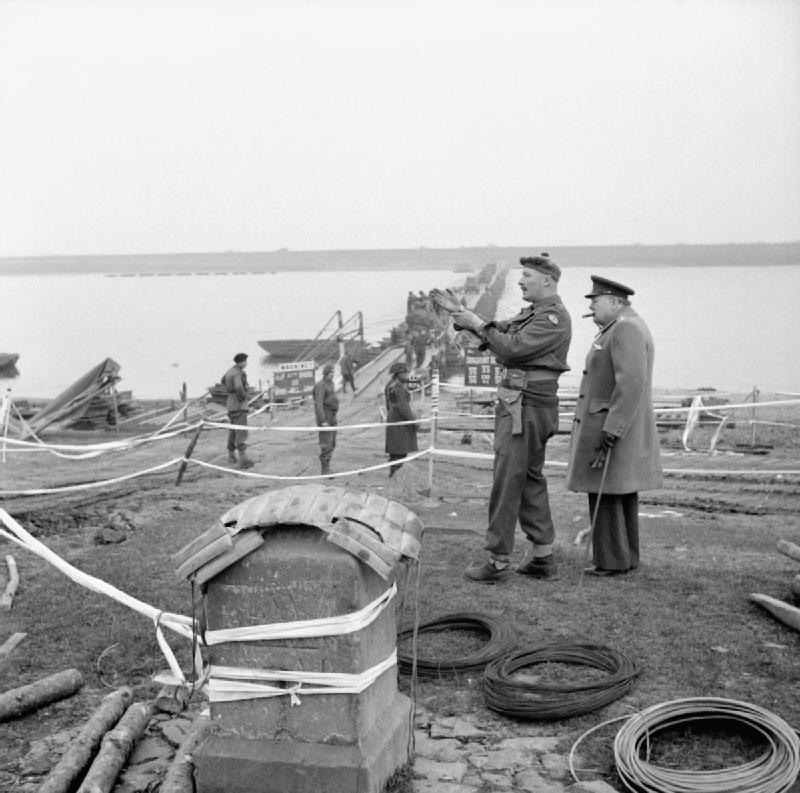
Winston Churchill and Ritchie watch traffic moving across the Rhine on 26 March 1945.

Unlike his Eighth Army predecessor Cunningham, who never regained an active command following his dismissal, Ritchie's XII Corps was chosen to participate in the invasion of Normandy as part of Lieutenant-General Miles Dempsey's British Second Army, which in turn was part of General Sir Bernard Montgomery's 21st Army Group. Although Ritchie was not one of Montgomery's protégés, the latter never considered removing him before or during the campaign. When Ritchie asked for another division and more artillery after the breakout from Normandy, Montgomery provided it.

James Cassels served as Ritchie's GSO1 in the 52nd (Lowland) Infantry Division and then, after a brief period as commanding officer of the Tyneside Scottish in the 49th (West Riding) Infantry Division, became Ritchie's BGS at XII Corps headquarters in January 1944. After Cassels was appointed commander of the 152nd Infantry Brigade on 27 June 1944, Ritchie was not satisfied with his replacement, and asked Montgomery for Brigadier Gilbert Minto (Jim) Elliot, the Commander, Royal Artillery, of the 51st (Highland) Infantry Division, who had been a fellow student at the Staff College, Camberley. Montgomery granted this request, and Elliot served as Ritchie's BGS in the Battle of Normandy and the subsequent campaign in North Western Europe, ending in May 1945 with the end of the war in Europe.

In the advance across France, Ritchie demonstrated a mastery of high-tempo operations and the employment of armour. He had the 15th (Scottish) Infantry Division seize a bridgehead over the Seine at Muids on 27 August. His 7th Armoured Division crossed the river on 1 September and reached its objective, Ghent, four days later. The following year, during Operation Plunder, the crossing of the Rhine, Ritchie demonstrated technical acumen, sound planning, and the coordination of the forces under his command.

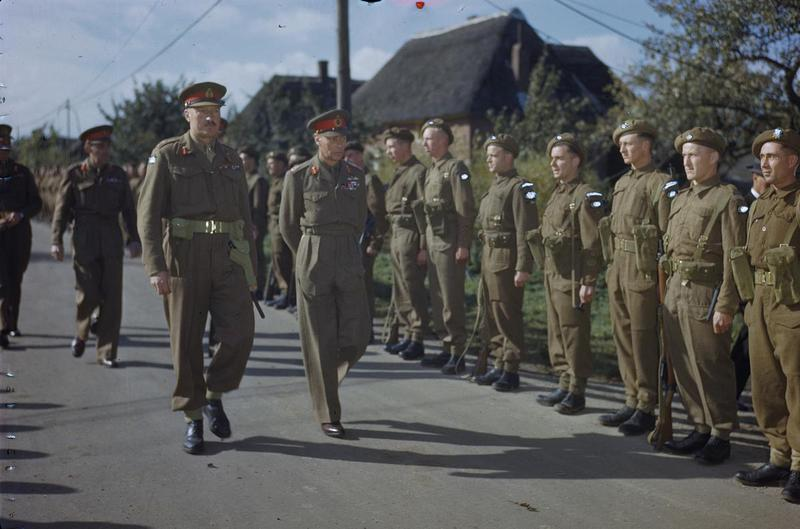
King George VI (right) and Ritchie (left) inspect men of XII Corps near Nijmegen on 13 October 1944.

Ritchie could be tough and occasionally ruthless with his subordinates. One of his first actions as commander of XII Corps was to relieve Major-General William Bradshaw from command of the 59th (Shropshire) Infantry Division because Ritchie felt he was not up to the task of handling a division in operations. During the advance into Germany, Ritchie was concerned at the slow advance of the 52nd (Lowland) Infantry Division and went to see Hakewill-Smith for an explanation. When Hakewill-Smith seemed unsure of what troops were deployed to lead the advance, Ritchie said: "I'll tell you, I've just come down from there, you've got three squadrons of your Recce Regiment deployed, and there's not another bloody thing in your whole division deployed, and yet you say you're held up." Ritchie then drew a line on the headquarters map with a grease pencil and told Hakewill-Smith that he would be going home if his units were not on that position by the next day. They were.

For his service in North West Europe, Ritchie was knighted, being appointed a Knight Commander of the Order of the British Empire on 5 July 1945, and he was mentioned in despatches for "gallant and distinguished services", on 22 March and 9 August 1945. He also received several foreign awards, including being made a Commander of the Legion of Merit by the United States, a Knight Grand Officer of the Order of Orange-Nassau with Swords by the Netherlands, and a Commander of the Legion of Honour by France, which also awarded him the Croix de guerre. He became a substantive lieutenant-general on 30 October 1945, with seniority backdated to 21 December 1944.

The historian Richard Mead had kind words for Ritchie:

It is a pity that history will remember Ritchie primarily as the loser of the Battle of Gazala, as his overall achievements were not inconsiderable. He was a victim of promotion beyond his capabilities, where the fault lay substantially with his superior officer, Auchinleck. The continuing support of Brooke was the key factor in his recovery, whilst Montgomery, for whom sacking by Auchinleck was no disqualification, allowed him to play to his strengths. He was never heard to complain about his treatment and his willingness to step down and learn how to command smaller formations was truly admirable.

== Post-war ==
After the war Ritchie remained in the British Army, becoming GOC Scottish Command and Governor of Edinburgh Castle in 1945 and GOC Far East Land Forces in 1947. He was promoted to general on 23 April 1947, with seniority backdated to 9 October 1946. His tenure coincided with the first year of the Malayan Emergency. In his report on operations from June 1948 to June 1949, he described the communists as "terrorists and thugs" who "showed no more courage than any others of that ilk."

In July 1949, Ritchie became the commander of the British Army Staff in Washington and Military member of the Joint Staff Mission there, and he served in this position until his retirement from the army. He became a Knight Commander of the Order of the Bath in the 1947 Birthday Honours, and was advanced to a Knight Grand Cross of the Order of the British Empire in the 1951 Birthday Honours. From December 1948 until his retirement, Ritchie also held the ceremonial appointment of aide-de-camp general to the King, and from September 1950 he was colonel-in-chief of the Black Watch (Royal Highland Regiment), his old regiment. He retired from the Army on 29 August 1951.

Following his retirement Ritchie emigrated to Canada, where he became a director of the Canadian subsidiary of Tanqueray Gordon & Co. and chairman of the Mercantile & General Reinsurance Co. of Canada, Macdonald-Buchanan Properties Ltd and the Board of Governors of the Canadian Corps of Commissionaires. He was appointed a Commander of the Order of St John on 2 August 1960, and advanced to a Knight of the Order of St John on 2 July 1963.

He died at his home in Toronto on 11 December 1983 at the age of 86. His remains were cremated and the ashes scattered on his son Dugald's property near Claremont, Ontario.

== Dates of rank ==
Second lieutenant	Lieutenant	Captain	Major	Lieutenant-Colonel
16 December 1914	2 October 1915	2 March 1916 (temporary); 22 April 1916 (acting); 19 November 1917	1 July 1933 (brevet); 2 June 1934	1 January 1936 (brevet); 3 January 1938

Colonel	Brigadier	Major-general	Lieutenant-general	General
26 August 1939 (seniority 1 January 1939)	22 December 1939 (acting); 22 June 1940 (temporary)	28 October 1940 (acting); 28 October 1941 (temporary); 3 April 1944 (war substantive); 18 May 1944 (seniority 25 December 1943)	27 November 1941 (acting); 3 April 1944 (temporary); 30 October 1945 (seniority 21 December 1944)	23 April 1947 (seniority 9 October 1946)

== Notes ==
Military offices
Preceded by Alan Cunningham	GOC 51st (Highland) Infantry Division; 1940–1941	Succeeded by Douglas Wimberley
Preceded by Sir Alan Cunningham	GOC Eighth Army; 1941–1942	Succeeded by Sir Claude Auchinleck
Preceded by Sir John Laurie	GOC 52nd (Lowland) Infantry Division; 1942–1943	Succeeded by Edmund Hakewill-Smith
Preceded by Montagu Stopford	GOC XII Corps; 1943–1945	Post disbanded
Preceded by Sir Andrew Thorne	GOC-in-C Scottish Command; 1945–1947	Succeeded by Sir Philip Christison
New title	C-in-C Far East Land Forces; 1947–1948	Succeeded by Sir John Harding
Honorary titles
Preceded by Archibald Wavell, 1st Earl Wavell	Colonel of the Black Watch (Royal Highland Regiment); 1950–1952	Succeeded by Neil McMicking
