= Richard Goodwin (British Army officer) =

Lieutenant-General Sir Richard Goodwin KCB CBE DSO
- Born: 17 August 1908; Woolwich, London
- Died: 28 October 1986 (aged 78); Bury St Edmunds, Suffolk, England
- Military career
- Allegiance: United Kingdom
- Branch: British Army
- Service years: 1928–1969
- Rank: Lieutenant-General
- Nickname: "Dick"
- Service number: 40616
- Unit: Suffolk Regiment
- Commands: I Corps (1963–1966); East Africa Command (1960–1963); 49th (North Midlands and West Riding) Division (1957–1960); 6th Infantry Brigade (1957); 214th Infantry Brigade (1945); 1st Battalion, Suffolk Regiment (1943–1945)
- Conflicts: Second World War
- Awards: Knight Commander of the Order of the Bath; Commander of the Order of the British Empire; Distinguished Service Order

Lieutenant-General Sir Richard Elton Goodwin, KCB, CBE, DSO (17 August 1908 – 28 October 1986) was a senior British Army officer. He served in the Second World War as commanding officer of the 1st Battalion, Suffolk Regiment during the campaign in Northwest Europe from June 1944 until May 1945, and later reached high office in the 1960s.

== Military career ==
Goodwin joined the British Army was commissioned as a second lieutenant into the Suffolk Regiment in 1928. He was promoted to lieutenant on 30 August 1931. He served in India and became aide-de-camp to the Governor of Madras in 1935.

Goodwin served in the Second World War. He was second-in-command of the 9th Battalion, Royal Warwickshire Regiment from 1942, and then commanding officer of the 1st Battalion, Suffolk Regiment from 1943.

After the war, Goodwin commanded the 214th Infantry Brigade in 1945 and then went to the Staff College, Camberley in 1946. He became a college commander at the Royal Military Academy Sandhurst in 1947 and a colonel on the General Staff at General Headquarters Far East Land Forces in 1949.

Goodwin was appointed commandant at the School of Infantry in 1951 and commander of 6th Infantry Brigade within the British Army of the Rhine in 1954. He went on to be general officer commanding (GOC) 49th (North Midlands and West Riding) Division and North Midland District of the Territorial Army in 1957 and GOC East Africa Command in 1960. In this capacity he accelerated the commissioning of African officers. He was appointed GOC 1st (British) Corps within the British Army of the Rhine in 1963 and military secretary in 1966; he retired in 1969.

Military offices
Preceded by Cecil Firbank	Commandant of the School of Infantry; 1951–1954	Succeeded by Cosmo Nevill
Preceded by Ralph Younger	GOC 49th (North Midlands and West Riding) Division; 1957–1960	Succeeded by Theodore Birkbeck
Preceded by Sir Nigel Tapp	GOC East Africa Command; 1960–1963	Succeeded by Sir Ian Freeland
Preceded by Sir Kenneth Darling	GOC 1st (British) Corps; 1963–1966	Succeeded by Sir John Mogg
Preceded by Sir John Anderson	Military Secretary; 1966–1969	Succeeded by Sir Thomas Pearson
Honorary titles
Preceded by Sir Reginald Denning	Colonel of the Royal Anglian Regiment; 1966−1971	Succeeded by Sir Ian Freeland
