= Douglas Dickinson =

British Army general (1886–1949)

Lieutenant-General Douglas Dickinson CB DSO OBE MC
- Born: 6 November 1886
- Died: 8 January 1949 (aged 62)
- Military career
- Allegiance: United Kingdom
- Branch: British Army
- Service years: 1906–1944
- Rank: Lieutenant-General
- Service number: 21854
- Unit: Welch Regiment
- Commands: East Africa Force (1939–1940); Nigeria Regiment (1936–1939); 1st Battalion, Welch Regiment (1934–1936)
- Conflicts: First World War; Second World War
- Awards: Companion of the Order of the Bath; Distinguished Service Order; Officer of the Order of the British Empire; Military Cross; Mentioned in Despatches (6)

Lieutenant-General Douglas Povah Dickinson, CB, DSO, OBE, MC (6 November 1886 – 8 January 1949) was a senior British Army officer who commanded the East Africa Force at the start of the Second World War.

== Military career ==
After attending the Royal Military College at Sandhurst, Dickinson was commissioned into the Welch Regiment on 6 October 1906. He served in France and Belgium during the First World War. After attending the Staff College, Camberley, from 1919 to 1920, he was appointed Deputy Assistant Quartermaster-General there in 1925, Inspector of the Iraq Army in Kurdistan in 1930 and Inspector with British Military Mission attached to the Iraq Army in 1932. He went on to be commanding officer of the 1st Battalion of The Welch Regiment in 1934, commandant of the Nigeria Regiment in 1936 and Inspector-General of the African Colonial Forces early in 1939. Dickinson served in the Second World War as General Officer Commanding the East Africa Force from September 1939 and as chief of staff of Western Command from January 1941. He retired in 1944.

== Family ==
In 1924 Dickinson married Frances Mildred Wilson; they had two daughters.

== Bibliography ==
- Smart, Nick (2005). Biographical Dictionary of British Generals of the Second World War. Barnsley: Pen & Sword. ISBN 1-84415-049-6.

Military offices
New command	GOC East Africa Force; 1939–1940	Succeeded by Sir Alan Cunningham
