= Nigel Tapp =

British Army general

Major-General Sir Nigel Tapp KBE CB DSO
- Born: 1904
- Died: 1991 (aged 86–87)
- Military career
- Allegiance: United Kingdom
- Branch: British Army
- Service years: 1924–1961
- Rank: Major-General
- Service number: 30558
- Unit: Royal Artillery
- Commands: 7th Field Regiment, Royal Artillery; Commander, Royal Artillery 25th Indian Infantry Division; 2nd Anti Aircraft Group; East Africa Command
- Conflicts: World War II
- Awards: Knight Commander of the Order of the British Empire; Companion of the Order of the Bath; Distinguished Service Order

Major-General Sir Nigel Prior Hanson Tapp KBE CB DSO (1904–1991) was general officer commanding East Africa Command of the British Army.

== Military career ==
He was the son of Lieutenant-colonel James William Hanson Tapp of the Royal Artillery and his wife Winefred Grace Molesworth, daughter of Anthony Oliver Molesworth of the Royal Artillery. Educated at Bedford School, Nigel Tapp was commissioned into the Royal Artillery in 1924. He served in the Sudan Defence Force from 1932 to 1938.

He also served in World War II initially as a general staff officer with the British Expeditionary Force and then as a general staff officer at the War Office. He was appointed commanding officer of 7th Field Regiment Royal Artillery in 1942 and was still commanding it during Operation Overlord in June 1944. He then became Commander Royal Artillery for 25th Division in 1945.

After the war he became district commander for Eritrea in 1946 and then deputy director of land/air warfare at the War Office in 1948. He was made deputy director, Royal Artillery in 1949. He became commander, Royal Artillery, for 1st (British) Corps in 1951 and general officer commanding 2nd Anti Aircraft Group in 1954. He was director of military training at the War Office from 1955 to 1957 when he became general officer commanding East Africa Command; he retired in 1961.

Military offices
Preceded by Sir Gerald Lathbury	GOC East Africa Command; 1957–1960	Succeeded by Sir Richard Goodwin
