= Harry Wetherall =

British Army general (1889–1979)

Lieutenant-General Sir Harry Wetherall KBE CB DSO MC
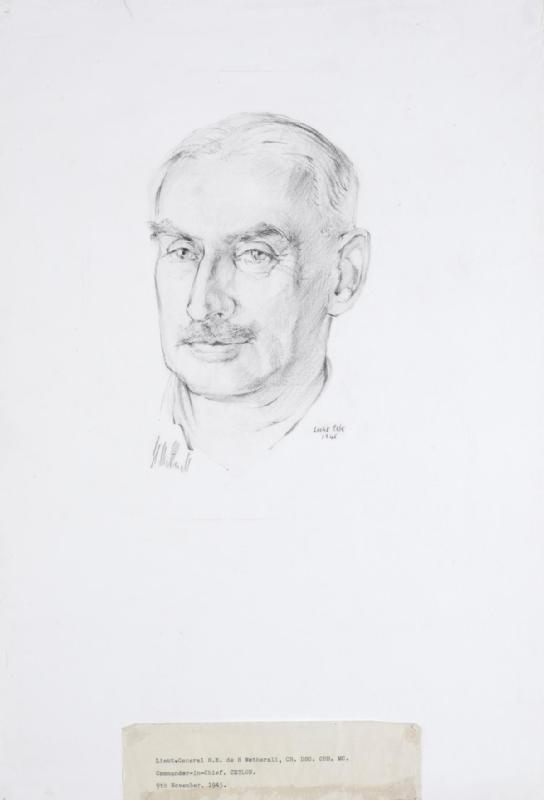
- Born: 22 February 1889; Belgrave Square, Belgravia, London, England
- Died: 18 November 1979 (aged 90); Somerset, England
- Military career
- Allegiance: United Kingdom
- Branch: British Army
- Service years: 1908−1946
- Rank: Lieutenant-General
- Service number: 4407
- Units: Gloucestershire Regiment; York and Lancaster Regiment
- Commands: Commander-in-Chief, Ceylon (1945–1946); East Africa Force (1941); 11th African Division (1940–1941); 19th Brigade (1938–1940); 1st Battalion, York and Lancaster Regiment (1936–1938); 2/4th Battalion Oxfordshire and Buckinghamshire Light Infantry (1917–1918)
- Conflicts: First World War; Arab revolt in Palestine; Second World War
- Awards: Knight Commander of the Order of the British Empire; Companion of the Order of the Bath; Distinguished Service Order; Military Cross; Mentioned in dispatches

Lieutenant-General Sir Harry Edward de Robillard Wetherall, KBE, CB, DSO, MC (22 February 1889 – 18 November 1979) was an officer in the British Army during the First and Second World Wars.

== Military career ==
Wetherall was commissioned into the Gloucestershire Regiment in 1909.

He served in the First World War in France and Belgium, becoming commanding officer of 2/4th Battalion Oxfordshire and Buckinghamshire Light Infantry in 1917. In March 1918 he was seriously wounded by a piece of shell in his neck.

After the war he became a lieutenant colonel in the Machine Gun Corps and then a general staff officer for Weapon Training in Scottish Command in 1930. He then served in Palestine where he was appointed Commanding Officer of 1st Battalion, York and Lancaster Regiment in 1936 and then Commander of 19th Brigade in 1938.

He served in the Second World War as general officer commanding 11th African Division in Abyssinia in 1941: he was part of the "Southern Front" for this campaign and commanded the Division during the advance from Kenya, through Italian Somaliland, and into Ethiopia. In late 1941, with the campaign all but over, the 11th African Division was disbanded and he became General Officer Commanding the East Africa Force. He was then appointed Commander-in-Chief, Ceylon in 1943.

After the war he became Commander-in-Chief, Ceylon at a time when the Sri Lankan independence struggle was ongoing; he retired in 1946.

== Bibliography ==
- Smart, Nick (2005). Biographical Dictionary of British Generals of the Second World War. Barnesley: Pen & Sword. ISBN 1844150496.

Military offices
Preceded by Sir Alan Cunningham	GOC East Africa Force; August–December 1941	Succeeded by Sir William Platt
Honorary titles
Preceded by Alexander Pagan	Colonel of the Gloucestershire Regiment; 1947–1954	Succeeded by Charles Firth
