= Arthur Dowler =

British Army general (1895–1963)

Lieutenant-General Sir Arthur Dowler KCB KBE DL
- Born: 16 July 1895; New York City, New York, United States
- Died: 14 November 1963 (aged 68); Bletchingley, Surrey, England
- Military career
- Allegiance: United Kingdom
- Branch: British Army
- Service years: 1914–1954
- Rank: Lieutenant-General
- Service number: 8634
- Unit: East Surrey Regiment
- Commands: East Africa Command (1948–1951); 2nd Base Area (1943); 38th (Welsh) Infantry Division (1941–1942); 2nd Infantry Brigade (1941); 1st Battalion, East Surrey Regiment (1939)
- Conflicts: First World War; Second World War
- Awards: Knight Commander of the Order of the Bath; Knight Commander of the Order of the British Empire; Mentioned in Despatches; Croix de Guerre (France)

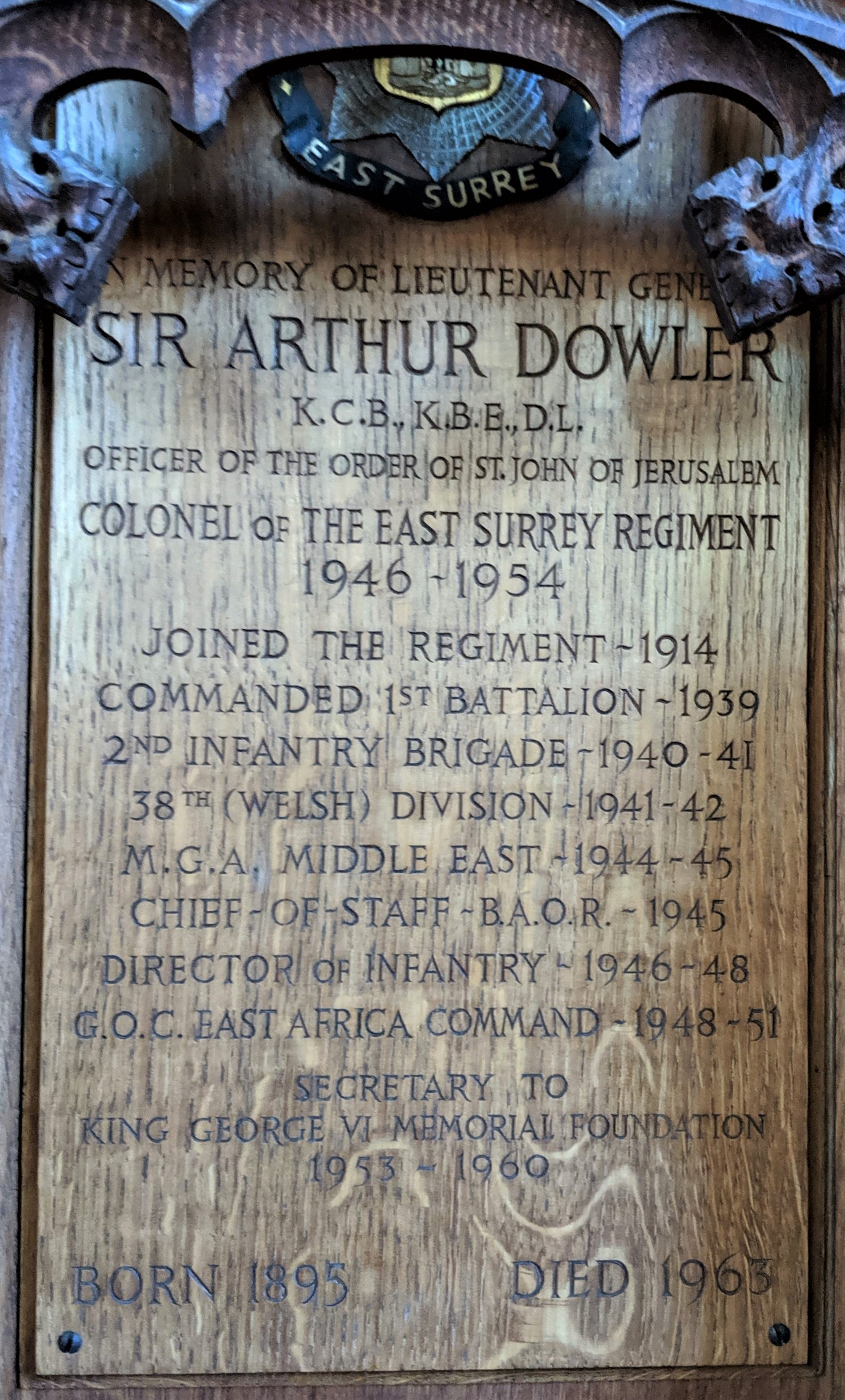
Plaque to Dowler in All Saints Church, Kingston upon Thames

Lieutenant-General Sir Arthur Arnhold Bullick Dowler, KCB, KBE, DL (16 July 1895 – 14 November 1963) was a senior British Army officer who served as General Officer Commanding East Africa Command from 1948 to 1951.

== Military career ==
Educated at Tonbridge School and the Royal Military College, Sandhurst, Dowler was, after graduating from the Royal Military College, Sandhurst in July 1914, commissioned as a second lieutenant into the East Surrey Regiment. He served in the First World War with the 2nd Battalion, East Surreys in France and Belgium.

He attended the Staff College, Camberley from 1931 to 1932, alongside Brian Horrocks, Sidney Kirkman, Cameron Nicholson and Thomas Rees, and later returned there as an instructor from 1937 until 1939.

Dowler also saw active service in the Second World War, initially in 1939 as commanding officer of the 1st Battalion, East Surrey Regiment and then as a General Staff Officer with the 49th (West Riding) Infantry Division. In 1940 he was promoted to brigadier and served on the General Staff of V Corps and, promoted on 1 October 1940 to colonel, subsequently commanded the 2nd Infantry Brigade. He was involved in the Narvik expedition in 1940, part of the Norwegian Campaign. In 1942 he was made General Officer Commanding (GOC) of the 38th (Welsh) Infantry Division and then Major-General in charge of Administration of Southern Command. He was put in charge of Administration for the Mediterranean Expeditionary Force in 1944. In July 1944 he was made a substantive major general.

After the war Dowler was appointed chief of staff of the British Army of the Rhine, before becoming director of infantry at the War Office in 1947. He was promoted to substantive lieutenant general in July 1948, with seniority dated back to December 1944, and made GOC East Africa Command from 1948 to 1951 and subsequently colonel of the East Surrey Regiment from July 1946, when he succeeded General Sir Richard Foster, until his resignation from that role in 1954. He retired from the army in December 1951. In May 1958 he became deputy lieutenant of Surrey.

== Bibliography ==
- Smart, Nick (2005). Biographical Dictionary of British Generals of the Second World War. Barnesley: Pen & Sword. ISBN 1844150496.

Military offices
Preceded by Noel Irwin	GOC 38th (Welsh) Infantry Division; 1941–1942	Succeeded by Donald Butterworth
Honorary titles
Preceded by Sir Richard Foster	Colonel of the East Surrey Regiment; 1946–1954	Succeeded by George Roupell
Military offices
Preceded by William Dimoline	GOC East Africa Command; 1948–1951	Succeeded by Sir Alexander Cameron
