= George Lindsay (British Army officer) =

British Army general

Major-General George Lindsay CB CMG CBE DSO
- Born: 3 July 1880
- Died: 28 November 1956 (aged 76)
- Relatives: Morgan Lindsay (brother)
- Military career
- Allegiance: United Kingdom
- Branch: British Army
- Service years: 1900–1939; 1939–1946
- Rank: Major-General
- Service number: 22253
- Commands: 9th (Highland) Infantry Division; Presidency and Assam District in India; 7th (Mechanised Experimental) Infantry Brigade; 41st Battalion, Machine Gun Corps
- Conflicts: Second Boer War; First World War; Second World War
- Awards: Companion of the Order of the Bath; Companion of the Order of St Michael and St George; Commander of the Order of the British Empire; Distinguished Service Order; Mentioned in Despatches

Major-General George Mackintosh Lindsay, CB, CMG, CBE, DSO (3 July 1880 – 28 November 1956) was a British Army officer who played a prominent role in the development of mechanised forces during the 1920s and 1930s. Lindsay had spent much of the First World War developing doctrine for the use of machine-guns and training specialist units to operate them. After the war, commanding an armoured-car unit in Iraq, he became intrigued by the potential of mechanised warfare techniques. He was an influential figure in the debate around armoured forces during the 1920s and 1930s, working with J.F.C. Fuller on the Experimental Mechanized Force, and commanded the first experimental armoured division in 1934. Retiring just before the Second World War, Lindsay was called out of retirement to command the 9th (Highland) Infantry Division in the first months of the war, following which he worked as a civil defence commissioner and as a representative of the Red Cross during the liberation of Europe.

== Early life and career ==
Lindsay was born in 1880, the sixth son of Lieutenant-Colonel Henry Gore Lindsay, the Chief Constable of Glamorganshire, and Ellen Sarah Lindsay. His paternal grandmother was the sister of the Earl of Arran, and his maternal grandfather was Charles Morgan, 1st Baron Tredegar. His siblings included Henry (known as "Morgan") (b. 1857), later Colonel of the Royal Monmouthshire Royal Engineers; Lionel (b. 1861), who later succeeded his father as Chief Constable; and Walter (b. 1866), who became the High Sheriff of County Kilkenny.

Lindsay was educated at Sandroyd School and Radley College, and in 1898 was commissioned into the Royal Monmouthshire Royal Engineers, a militia unit, in which his brother Henry was already an officer. In January 1900 he was commissioned as a second lieutenant into the Rifle Brigade, a regular infantry regiment, and two months later left Southampton on the SS Umbria to serve with them in South Africa in the Second Boer War. During the war he took part in operations in the Natal, including the action at Laing's Nek, operations in Transvaal July to November 1900, then served with the 13th Battalion Mounted Infantry in the Orange River Colony. He was promoted to lieutenant on 22 February 1901, and mentioned in despatches (including 25 April 1902 "for able and fearless leading in Ermelo district on 26th January 1902"). Following the end of the war in June 1902, Lindsay left Cape Town with other men of 1st the battalion Rifle Brigade on the SS Orissa, which arrived at Southampton in late October 1902, when the battalion was stationed at Portsmouth. In 1906 he was appointed adjutant of the Customs and Docks Rifle Volunteers (the 15th Middlesex Rifle Volunteers). When the reserve forces were reorganised into the Territorial Force in 1908, he became adjutant of the successor battalion, the 17th London Regiment (Poplar and Stepney Rifles), remaining with the battalion until 1911. During this time, he married Constance Elizabeth Hamilton; their first child died at birth in 1910. In 1909, he also became the Army and Navy middleweight officers' boxing champion. After a short spell with his regiment in 1911–12, he was appointed to the School of Musketry as an instructor, specialising in machine-guns, and was working here at the outbreak of war in 1914.

== First World War ==
On the outbreak of the First World War in August 1914, the British Army expanded rapidly, taking in hundreds of thousands of new recruits. Lindsay remained at the School of Musketry until 1915, when he was sent to France as an instructor in the headquarters machine-gun training school, before returning to England later in the year as a staff officer at the newly established Machine Gun Corps training centre. Lindsay had been a strong advocate of the centralisation of machine-gun units, concentrating them in specialised companies and battalions rather than distributed to individual infantry units, and the Corps had been formed to man them. The training for these units could focus on offensive as well as defensive operations, using heavy machine-guns in an indirect fire role, which provided substantially greater capability and flexibility in combat.

In 1916, Lindsay was given a front-line posting, as the brigade major of the 99th Brigade (United Kingdom), a New Army formation primarily composed of London volunteers from the Royal Fusiliers. He served with the 99th through the Battle of the Somme and Battle of Arras, receiving the Distinguished Service Order. In March 1918 he was promoted to colonel and made a staff officer at the First Army headquarters, responsible for the Army's machine-gun units. Following the Armistice, he commanded the 41st Battalion, Machine Gun Corps, in the Army of Occupation in Germany.

== Inter-war years ==
Following the reduction in forces after the end of the war, the Machine Gun Corps units were disbanded and Lindsay attended the Staff College, Camberley in 1920. After leaving Camberley, he was appointed to command an armoured car unit in Iraq. The British forces in Iraq were combined into RAF Iraq Command in 1922, a joint services command aiming to use airpower as the core method of securing the country. Over the following year, manoeuvres and security operations gave Lindsay an early opportunity to experiment with armoured forces working in close co-operation with aircraft for support and resupply. He became a strong proponent of the new ideas of mechanised warfare, seeing it as a new and dominant paradigm in military strategy.

In the summer of 1923, Lindsay was promoted to lieutenant-colonel in the Royal Tank Corps and made chief instructor of the Corps central school, where he became a leader in the nascent armoured-warfare movement within the Army. In 1926 he was appointed to the War Office as Inspector of the Royal Tank Corps and a member of the Mechanical Warfare Board, and from this position was able to work with J. F. C. Fuller to press the General Staff for the creation of the brigade-sized Experimental Mechanized Force in 1927. This held large-scale exercises in 1927 and 1928, demonstrating the practical utility of armoured units. Through the remainder of his time at the War Office and during his next posting, on the staff in Egypt, Lindsay continued to study the lessons of these exercises and influence the General Staff's position on armoured warfare.

Returning from Egypt in 1932, Lindsay was given command of the 7th Infantry Brigade at Tidworth Camp, a motorised unit which had previously been the core of the Experimental Force. The culmination of his work with combined-arms forces was the end of the 1934 Army exercises, in which the 7th was used as part of an improvised armoured division led by Lindsay. However, the results were of limited success, partly due to personal disputes with Percy Hobart, who commanded the tank brigade and with whom Lindsay had had an acrimonious dispute. The immediate result of the failed experiment was to cut Lindsay off from the debate around the future of armoured warfare; he had recently been promoted to Major-General on 18 July 1934, and he would continue to rise in the Army, but he would no longer be involved with developing modern fighting doctrine.

== Senior command and the Second World War ==
In 1935, Lindsay was posted to Calcutta to command the Presidency and Assam District in eastern India; he held the post until 1939, when he retired from the Army. In retirement, he worked as Director of the British National Cadet Association and as colonel commandant of the Royal Tank Corps, a ceremonial post he took over from Major General Sir Ernest Swinton in October 1938.

However, the Second World War broke out a few months after he had retired. He was recalled to duty and given command of the newly formed 9th (Highland) Infantry Division, a hastily mobilised second-line Territorial unit. He relinquished command in March 1940, and was appointed as a deputy regional civil defence commissioner for the South-West of England. In this post, he helped coordinate civil defence and recovery during air-raids, and in a brief interlude in 1942 delivered the Lees Knowles Lecture at Cambridge on "War on the civil and military fronts". In 1944, he became Commissioner of the British Red Cross and the Order of St. John for North-West Europe, overseeing relief work during the liberation of France and the Low Countries.

Lindsay stepped down as Commissioner in 1946, and relinquished his ceremonial colonelcy of the Royal Tank Regiment in 1947. Finally retired, he served on a number of committees and councils, as diverse as the Army Boxing Association, the Anglo-Danish Society and the Educational Interchange Council, and in 1952 published a short pamphlet on "The Soviet-Communist Menace". He died in Epsom in 1956, survived by his wife and his surviving daughter, and leaving an estate of thirteen thousand pounds. His papers are held by the Liddell Hart Centre for Military Archives, and by the Tank Museum at Bovington.

== Bibliography ==
- Smart, Nick (2005). Biographical Dictionary of British Generals of the Second World War. Barnesley: Pen & Sword. ISBN 1844150496.

Military offices
New command	GOC 9th (Highland) Infantry Division; 1939–1940	Succeeded by Edward Beck
