= Alan Cunningham =

British Army general (1887–1983)

General Sir Alan Cunningham GCMG KCB DSO MC
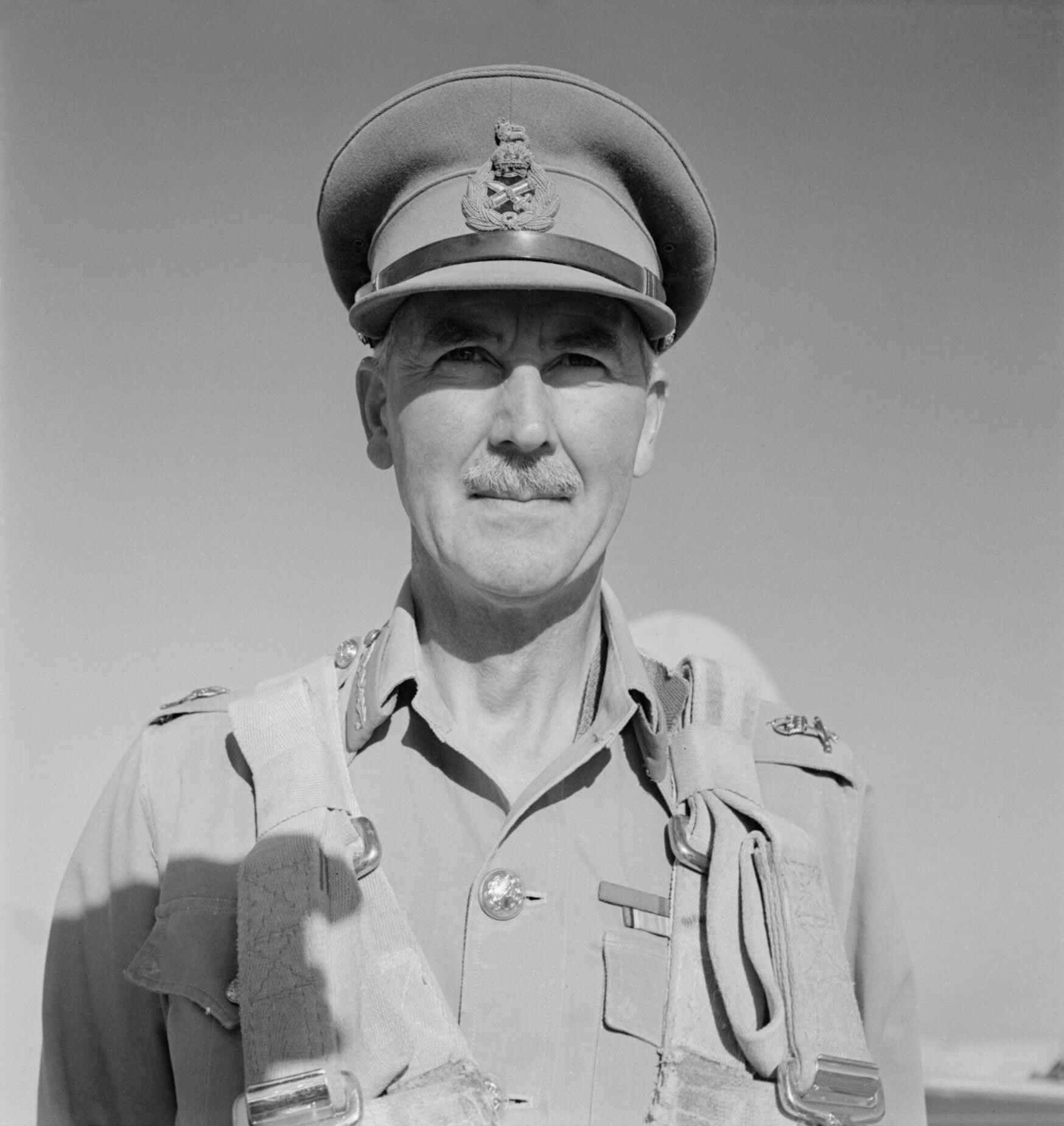
- Born: Alan Gordon Cunningham; 1 May 1887; Dublin, Ireland
- Died: 30 January 1983 (aged 95); Tunbridge Wells, Kent, England
- Burial place: Dean Cemetery, Edinburgh, Scotland
- Relatives: Andrew Cunningham, 1st Viscount Cunningham of Hyndhope (brother)
- Military career
- Allegiance: United Kingdom
- Branch: British Army
- Service years: 1906–1948
- Rank: General
- Service number: 74
- Unit: Royal Artillery
- Commands: Eastern Command; Northern Ireland; Staff College, Camberley; Eighth Army; East Africa Force; 51st (Highland) Infantry Division; 9th (Highland) Infantry Division; 66th Infantry Division; 5th Anti-Aircraft Division
- Conflicts: First World War; Second World War; Palestine Emergency
- Awards: Knight Grand Cross of the Order of St Michael and St George; Knight Commander of the Order of the Bath; Distinguished Service Order; Military Cross; Mentioned in despatches (4)
- Other work: High Commissioner of Palestine (1945–48); Colonel Commandant of the Royal Artillery

Sir Alan Gordon Cunningham, GCMG, KCB, DSO, MC (1 May 1887 – 30 January 1983), was a senior officer of the British Army noted for his victories over Italian forces in the East African Campaign during the Second World War. He then commanded Eighth Army in the desert campaign, but was relieved of command during the Crusader battle against Erwin Rommel. Later he served as the seventh and last High Commissioner of Palestine. He was the younger brother of Admiral of the Fleet Lord Cunningham of Hyndhope.

== Early life and military career ==
Cunningham was born on 1 May 1887 in Dublin, Ireland, the third son of Scottish Professor Daniel John Cunningham and his wife Elizabeth Cumming Browne. He was educated at Cheltenham College and the Royal Military Academy, Woolwich before taking a commission in the Royal Artillery in 1906. In 1909, his father died unexpectedly and Cunningham applied to join the British Indian Army as he could no longer afford the life style of an officer in Britain. At the out break of the First World War, he was deployed to France with the Indian Expeditionary Force. However, in 1915 he was transferred back to the Royal Artillery, due to a shortage in trained officers. He was awarded a Military Cross in 1915 and the Distinguished Service Order in 1918, he was also awarded three Mention in dispatches during the War. He had served as a Howitzer Battery Commander and was the Artillery brigade major for 20th (Light) Division in June 1917. For two years after the war, he served as a staff officer in the Straits Settlements. He went on to have a number of regimental duty posts, including a tour in Egypt in 1925. He was promoted to Brevet Lieutenant Colonel whilst conducting the post of Chief Instructor at the Anti-Aircraft Wing at the Small Arms School in Netheravon, and was appointed Commanding Officer of 1st Medium Brigade Royal Artillery in Portsmouth in 1935.

After graduating from the Royal Naval College, Greenwich in 1925, followed by the Imperial Defence College in 1937, Cunningham was appointed as the Commander, Royal Artillery of the 1st Infantry Division. However, he never took up this post as he was promoted in 1938 to major-general and given the task of forming and commanding the 5th Anti-Aircraft Division. Cunningham's headquarters was in Reading and the division covered Bristol, Portsmouth and Southampton. This area of operation in South-West England was aligned with the RAF 10 Group.

== Second World War ==
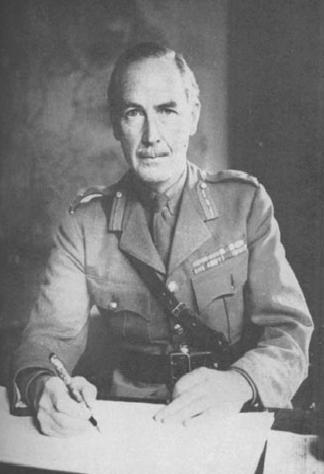
General Sir Alan Cunningham.

After Dunkirk, Cunningham was moved from 5th Anti-Aircraft initially to reform the 4th (Infantry) Division, but this was quickly changed and he was ordered to form and train the 66th Infantry Division, in Manchester. He was the moved to Scotland to command the 9th (Highland) Infantry Division, and renamed it 51st (Highland) Infantry Division, when the majority of that Division was lost in the withdrawal from France. At 3 days notice he was informed that he was to take command of the East Africa Force in Kenya and was promoted to acting lieutenant general.

During the East African Campaign General Sir Archibald Wavell, the Commander-in-Chief of the British Middle East Command, directed Cunningham to retake British Somaliland and free Addis Ababa, Ethiopia from the Italians whilst forces under the command of Lieutenant-General Sir William Platt would attack from Sudan in the north through Eritrea. Cunningham commanded three divisions in East Africa Force, the 1st (South African) Division commanded by Major General George Brink, the 11th (African) Division commanded by Major General Harry Edward de Robillard Wetherall and the 12th (African) Division commanded by Major General Reade Godwin-Austen . Cunningham's offensive started with the Battle of the Juba prior to which he issued his famous order of the day 'Hit them. Hit them hard and hit them again'. The Indian Ocean port of Kismayu (Italian: Chisimaio) was quickly captured and Cunningham realized that the Italians had no depth to their defence. He therefore ordered a rapid advance to Mogadishu (Italian: Mogadiscio) by the 23rd Nigerian Brigade who covered 275 miles in only three days. When General Wavell asked Cunningham when he might capture Mogadishu, he simply replied 'got it'. The Italians were then pursued and fought a number of covering actions at the Marda Pass and the River Awash. On 6 April 1941, Cunningham's forces entered Addis Ababa having advanced 1,687 miles at an average rate of 75 miles a day. On the 5 May 1941, Cunningham believed that it was safe for Emperor Haile Selassie to return to Addis Ababa, five years after he was forced to flee from the Italian forces. On 11 May, the northernmost units of Cunningham's forces, under South African Brigadier Dan Pienaar linked with Platt's forces under Major-General Mosley Mayne to besiege Amba Alagi. On 20 May, Mayne took the surrender of the Duke of Aosta, at Amba Alagi. Cunningham continued to lead his forces in mopping-up operations against the 40,000 Italian troops in the Galla-Sidamo region. He was appointed a Knight Commander of the Order of the Bath and awarded another Mention in Dispatches for his actions in East Africa. For this campaign he was also awarded Order of the Brilliant Star of Zanzibar, 1st class and Order of Menelik II, 1st class by Emperor Haile Selassie and the Order of the Crown, 1st class by the King of Belgium.

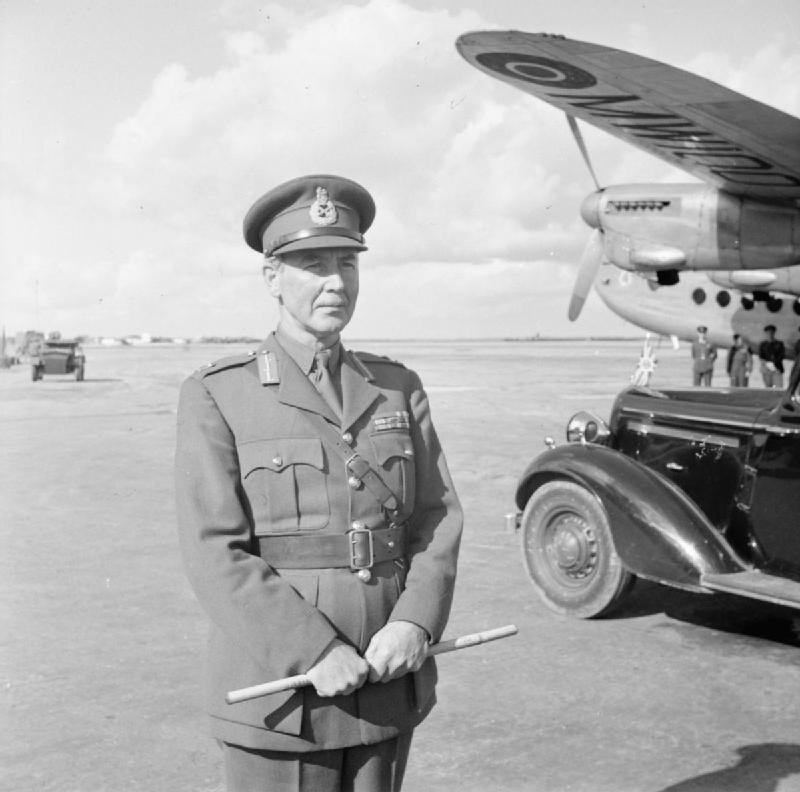
Lieutenant-General Sir Alan Cunningham, pictured at Lydda Airport in November 1945 on arriving to replace Field Marshal Lord Gort as High Commissioner of Palestine.

His success in East Africa led to Cunningham's appointment to form, train, and command the new Eighth Army in North Africa in August 1941. The Eighth Army was to consist of two Corps, XIII Corps (United Kingdom) was mainly infantry and was to be commanded by Lieutenant General Godwin-Austen, whom Cunningham had commanded in East Africa. XXX Corps was to be armoured and commanded by Lieutenant General Vyvyan Pope, the British armoured expert. However, Pope was killed with his staff in a plane crash on 6 October 1941 and he was replaced by the inexperienced cavalry officer Major General Charles Willoughby-Norrie. Cunningham had to form and train the Eighth Army in time to lead General Sir Claude Auchinleck's Libyan Desert offensive which under pressure from Churchill was due to begin in early November, but actually began on 18 November. It was called Operation Crusader.

Cunningham's offensive achieved complete surprise and the Axis were slow to react. This resulted in Willoughby-Norrie convincing Cunningham to amend the plan and allow him to strike for Tobruk. This resulted in the destruction of the British armour as it engaged the Afrika Korps as brigades, rather than Cunningham's plan for a concentrated Eighth Army fighting what Pope had termed 'the Big Tank Battle'. due to the heavy losses, there was a chance that Rommel could break through to Egypt, and Cunningham sought strategic advice from Auchinleck to either continue the offensive or to defend and rebuild the tank formations. Auchinleck, who had access to secret Ultra intelligence, ordered Cunningham to continue and Cunningham issued orders that XIII Corps was to take up the offensive and relieve the Siege of Tobruk.

On 25 November, the Axis counterattack into Egypt during Crusader had been repulsed, Cunningham was dismissed by Auchinleck. His replacement was Auchinleck's deputy chief of the general staff, Major-General Neil Ritchie, who was chosen due to his familiarity with the Operation Crusader plan. The day after Ritchie took over, XIII Corps relieved Tobruk as planned by Cunningham. Auchinleck had been content when he left Cunningham and it is likely that he was convinced by Air Marshal Arthur Tedder to replace him during the flight back to Cairo. Auchinleck asked Cunningham to go into No. 64 Field Hospital for security reasons, asking him "to agree to being placed on the sick list and to go into hospital for a period. I know that this will be against all your instincts, and that you will hate doing it" and Cunningham agreed. However, he had no health issues apart from being tired after fighting for 9 days as he pointed out "like all the troops fighting in Libya". Once Cunningham was in hospital, Auchinleck wrote again to offer his "forgiveness in having inflicted this indignity on you … [I] know very well how you disliked having to pretend that you are sick, when you are not." Cunningham was then examined by a consultant Colonel Smallwood on the 29 November who wrote that he was "tired and showed signs of strain’ due to his ‘long and heavy responsibilities" which "had culminated in a period of about a week with practically no sleep", he concluded that,"since admission to hospital he has slept soundly each night… He is composed, and very alert and mentally active. There is no evidence of any “nervous breakdown."" However, whilst Cunningham was in isolated in hospital, the narrative of a nervous breakdown was spread and became the accepted story.

When he return to Britain in December 1941, Churchill refused to give him a role, stating that he was either sick or incompetent, but General Alan Brooke contended that he was neither. However, when Jan Smuts came to Britain the October 1942 he convinced Churchill that Cunningham should be given a role. Cunningham, who was now a Major General again, was appointed as the Commandant of the Staff College, Camberley (1942). In 1943 he was appointed as General Officer C-in-C in Northern Ireland and promoted back to Lieutenant General. In this role he was heavily involved in preparing US troops for D Day and was awarded the Legion of Merit Medal by the US Government for this work. Finally, in 1944 he was appointed as the General Officer C-in-C Eastern Command with the tasks of both training replacements for Europe and disbanding the Home Guard. During these later posts, Cunningham gave a number of important speeches about military leadership, and the eminent academic, Professor John Adair (author), has said of Cunningham words that it "puts him up with Montgomery and Slim as a thinker about leadership in the military context. He was unique, however, in lecturing on the subject actually during the Second World War, whereas they saved their thoughts until the post war years."

== Post-war ==
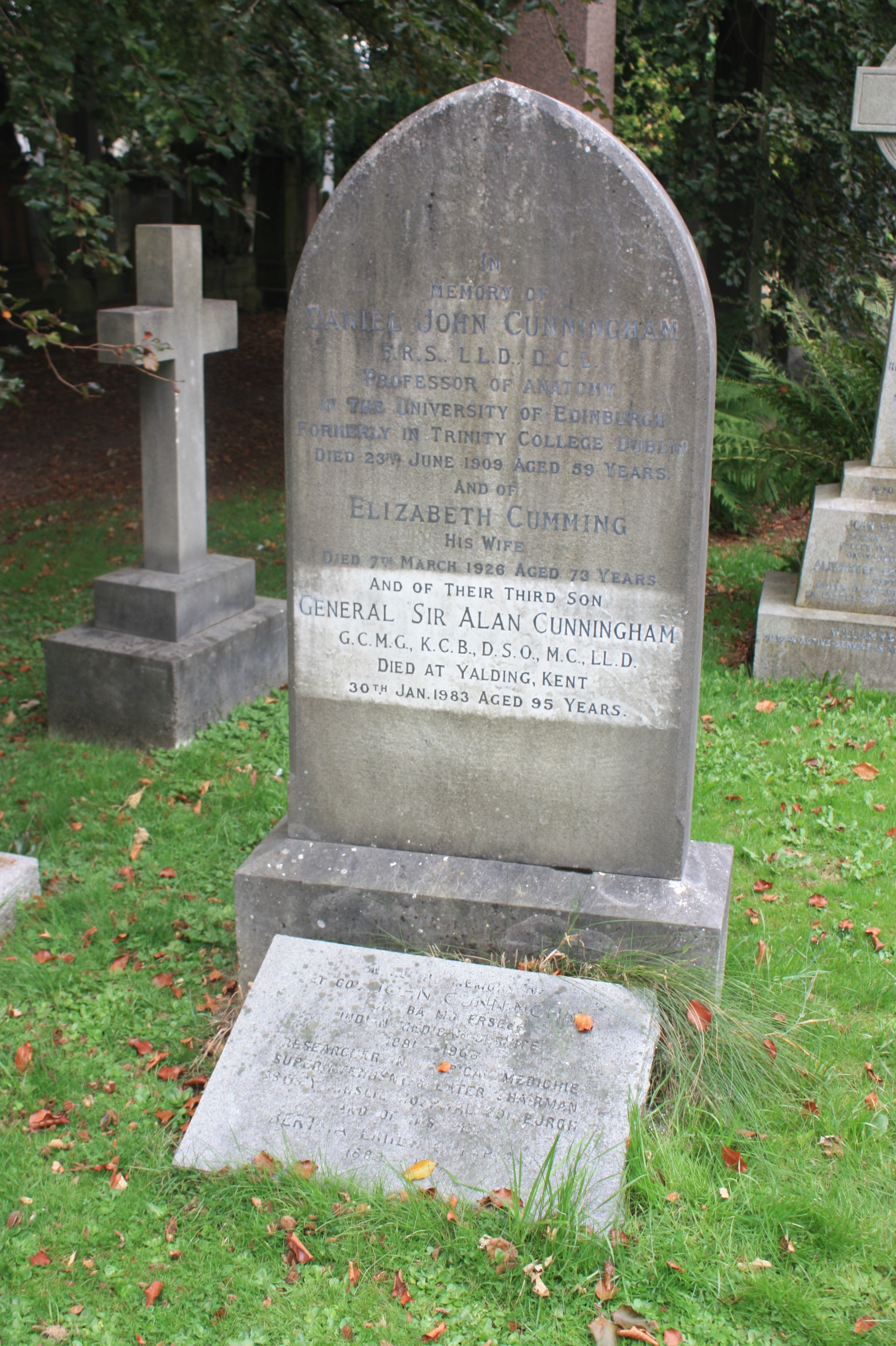
General Sir Alan Cunningham's grave, Dean Cemetery.

After the war, Cunningham, who was promoted to general on 30 October 1945, returned to the Middle East as High Commissioner of Palestine; he served in the position from 1945 to 1948. He was in charge of operations against the Hagana, a Zionist militia, Etzel and Lehi terrorists who in this period fought against the Mandate authorities and the Palestinian Arab population, as well as Palestinian Arab militias, with Arab state armies poised to invade as soon as the British withdrew. Cunningham had retired from the army in October 1946 when he relinquished the role of Commander-in-Chief Palestine but retained the job of High Commissioner until 1948. He was awarded a second knighthood for his duties and became a Knight Grand Cross of the Order of St Michael and St George.

On return to Britain, Cunningham was offered the post of Black Rod at the Palace of Westminster, but declined it and retired from public life. He continued to serve, however, as the Colonel Commandant of the Royal Artillery until 1954, as a Deputy Lord Lieutenant of Hampshire from 1950, as the President of the Council of Governors at Cheltenham College from 1951 until 1963. Also, in 1954, he was asked to play a major role in the visit to Britain of Emperor Haile Selassie. On 5 April 1951, at the age of 61, he married Margery Snagge.

Cunningham died at the age of 95 in Royal Tunbridge Wells, Kent, England on 30 January 1983. He is buried with his father and mother under a simple monument near the Dean Gallery entrance to Dean Cemetery in Edinburgh.

== Orders and decorations ==
- Knight Grand Cross of the Order of St Michael and St George (1948)
- Knight Commander of the Order of the Bath (30 May 1941; Companion 1941)
- Distinguished Service Order (1918)
- Military Cross (1915)
- 1914 Star with Clasp
- Mentioned in Despatches (1 January 1916, 18 May 1917 and 20 May 1918; 6 January 1944)
- British War Medal
- Victory Medal
- Order of the Brilliant Star of Zanzibar, 1st class (28 October 1941)
- Commander of the Legion of Merit (United States, 1945)
- Order of the Crown, 1st class (Belgium, 1950)
- Order of Menelik II, 1st class (Ethiopia, 1954)

== Bibliography ==
- Playfair, I. S. O.; Flynn, F. C.; Molony, C. J. C.; Gleave, T. P. (2004) [1960]. Butler, J. R. M. (ed.). The Mediterranean and Middle East: British Fortunes Reach their Lowest Ebb (September 1941 to September 1942). History of the Second World War United Kingdom Military Series. Vol. III. London: Naval & Military Press. ISBN 978-1-84574-067-2.
- Smart, Nick (2005). Biographical Dictionary of British Generals of the Second World War. Barnesley: Pen & Sword. ISBN 1844150496.
- Warner, Philip (2006) [1981]. Auchinleck: The Lonely Soldier. Barnsley: Pen & Sword Military. ISBN 978-1-844-15384-8.
- Dennis, Vincent (2024). The Forgotten General: Sir Alan Cunningham GCMG, KCB, DSO, MC. Amberley Publishing. ISBN 978-1398113992.
- Dennis Vincent (2025). Chapter 2: Cunningham's Team on Operation Canvas: Superiors, Subordinates and Peers in The Second World War in East Africa, 1940-1941. Brill. ISBN 978-90-04-71025-2

Military offices
Preceded by New post	GOC 5th Anti-Aircraft Division; 1938–1940	Succeeded by Robert Allen
Preceded by Arthur Purser	GOC 66th Infantry Division; January–June 1940	Post disbanded
Preceded by Edward Beck	GOC 9th (Highland) Infantry Division; June–August 1940	Post redesignated 51st (Highland) Infantry Division
Preceded by New post	GOC 51st (Highland) Infantry Division; August–October 1940	Succeeded by Neil Ritchie
Preceded by Douglas Dickinson	GOC East Africa Force; 1940–1941	Succeeded by Harry Wetherall
Preceded by New post	GOC Eighth Army; September–November 1941	Succeeded by Neil Ritchie
Preceded by Montagu Stopford	Commandant of the Staff College, Camberley; 1942–1943	Succeeded by Douglas Wimberley
Preceded by Vivian Majendie	GOC British Army in Northern Ireland; 1943–1944	Succeeded by Gerard Bucknall
Preceded by Sir Kenneth Anderson	GOC-in-C Eastern Command; 1944–1945	Succeeded by Sir Oliver Leese
Government offices
Preceded by John Vereker, 6th Viscount Gort	High Commissioner of Palestine; High Commissioner for Trans-Jordan; 21 November 1945 – 14 May 1948	Succeeded by Chaim Weizmann (As President of Israel)
Preceded by John Vereker, 6th Viscount Gort	High Commissioner of Palestine; High Commissioner for Trans-Jordan; 21 November 1945 – 14 May 1948	Succeeded by David Ben-Gurion (As Prime Minister of Israel)
Diplomatic posts
Preceded by John Vereker, 6th Viscount Gort	High Commissioner of Palestine; High Commissioner for Trans-Jordan; 21 November 1945 – 14 May 1948	Succeeded by Knox Helm (As British Ambassador to Israel)
