= Ian Freeland =

British Army general (1912–1979)

Lieutenant-General Sir Ian Freeland GBE KCB DSO DL
- Born: 14 September 1912; Milton, Hampshire, England
- Died: 2 July 1979 (aged 66); Cambridge, England
- Military career
- Allegiance: United Kingdom
- Branch: British Army
- Service years: 1932–1971
- Rank: Lieutenant-General
- Service number: 53691
- Units: Norfolk Regiment; Royal Inniskilling Fusiliers
- Commands: 7th Battalion, Royal Norfolk Regiment; 1/5th Battalion Queen's Royal Regiment (West Surrey); 2nd Battalion, Royal Inniskilling Fusiliers; 12th Infantry Brigade; 54th (East Anglian) Division/District; East Africa Command; British Land Forces Kenya Army; Northern Ireland Command
- Conflicts: World War II; Zanzibar Revolution; Cyprus Emergency; Northern Ireland
- Awards: Knight Grand Cross of the Order of the British Empire; Knight Commander of the Order of the Bath; Chevalier of the Order of the Crown with Palm (Belgium); Croix de Guerre 1940 with Palm (Belgium)

Lieutenant-General Sir Ian Henry Freeland (14 September 1912 – 2 July 1979) was a senior British Army officer, who served with distinction during World War II. He was General Officer Commanding (GOC) and Director of Operations in security matters in Northern Ireland in the aftermath of rioting in 1969 and the beginning of the Troubles.

== Early military career and Second World War ==
Born in Milton, Hampshire, England on 14 September 1912, the son of Major-General Sir Francis Edward Freeland, a British Army officer, Ian Henry Freeland was initially educated at Wellington College, Berkshire. Then, after attending the Royal Military College, Sandhurst, Freeland was commissioned as a second lieutenant in the Norfolk Regiment (Royal Norfolk Regiment from 3 June 1935) on 1 September 1932, and, after being posted to India to join the regiment's 1st Battalion, was promoted to lieutenant on 1 September 1935.

Shortly after the outbreak of World War II in September 1939, Freeland was, on 17 January 1940, promoted to the acting rank of captain and made adjutant to his battalion, which in July 1940 returned to England, then under threat of a German invasion. His rank of captain was made permanent on 1 September 1940. In 1942, he then served as brigade major for the 7th Infantry Brigade, part of the 3rd Infantry Division under Major General Eric Hayes, and General Staff Officer Grade 2 (GSO2) at the War Office in 1943 and gained a variety of wartime promotions, culminating on 22 April 1944 in temporary promotion to lieutenant colonel and he became Commanding Officer (CO) of the 7th Battalion, Royal Norfolks, a second-line Territorial Army (TA) unit. The battalion formed part of the 176th Infantry Brigade of the 59th (Staffordshire) Infantry Division, commanded by Major General Lewis Lyne, and, in late June, was sent overseas to Normandy, France, a few weeks after the D-Day landings. The battalion was involved in the Battle of Normandy, including the capture of Caen during Operation Charnwood, where the battalion suffered over 150 casualties, which was followed by the Second Battle of the Odon, and for his leadership Freeland was appointed a Companion of the Distinguished Service Order (DSO) on 21 December 1944.

The citation for this award describes how his battalion was the forward unit of a bridgehead over the River Orne near Grimbosq and over the forty-eight hours of 7 and 8 August 1944 repelled nine German counterattacks (by elements of the 271st Volksgrenadier Division and 12th SS Panzer Division Hitlerjugend). Despite heavy German fire, Freeland constantly moved around the battlefield to encourage his forward companies, and find the moment to launch his own offensive. Around the same time Captain David Jamieson of Freeland's battalion was awarded the Victoria Cross (VC). Just a few days later, however, the battalion, along with the rest of the 59th Division, was, due to a critical manpower shortage in the British Army at this stage of the war, broken up and the remaining men were sent to other British infantry units to bring them to strength.

After his battalion's disbandment, Freeland was posted to command the 1/5th Battalion of the Queen's Royal Regiment (West Surrey), part of the 131st Infantry Brigade of Major General Gerald Lloyd-Verney's 7th Armoured Division, through Belgium, and was awarded the Belgian decorations of Chevalier of the Order of the Crown with Palm and the Croix de Guerre 1940 with Palm. The citation for these awards emphasised his command of the battalion during the liberation of Ghent, when the battalion was the leading element of the 7th Armoured Division. Freeland continued to lead the 1/5th Queens throughout the rest of the Northwestern Europe Campaign, until the end of World War II in Europe in May 1945, which saw the battalion in Hamburg, Germany.

== Postwar ==
Freeland held the temporary rank of colonel and served on the staff of HQ VIII Corps District, under Lieutenant General Sir Evelyn Barker, from 1945 to 1946, before becoming second-in-command of the 4th Armoured Brigade and further staff duties followed at HQ British Army of the Rhine (BAOR) in 1946–1947. This was followed by duty as commandant, All Arms Training Centre from 1948 to 1949; staff duty at the War Office from 1949 to 1950; and instructing at the Staff College, Camberley from 1951 to 1953.

While, at the end of the war, he held war temporary rank as a lieutenant-colonel, he was still only a substantive captain and was promoted to substantive major on 1 July 1946, and granted a brevet promotion to lieutenant-colonel on 1 July 1951. On 15 February 1954, he was promoted substantive lieutenant-colonel, and given command of 2nd Battalion, Royal Inniskilling Fusiliers. The battalion served in Cyprus in 1954.

Freeland was promoted to substantive colonel on 2 April 1956 (with seniority from 10 June 1954), and brigadier on 1 January 1960. He served as brigade commander of the 12th Infantry Brigade from 1956 to 1957, at the Imperial Defence College in 1958, and then returned to the War Office. He was promoted major-general on 18 March 1961 (with seniority from 10 February 1961), and appointed General Officer Commanding (GOC) 54th (East Anglian) Division/District of the Territorial Army, holding that post until 17 July 1963. He was then GOC, East Africa Command from 1 November 1963, then Commander, Kenya Army, until 28 November 1964, by which time the appointment had been renamed GOC, British Land Forces Kenya. This period saw British involvement in the Zanzibar Revolution. He was appointed Companion of the Order of the Bath (CB) in the 1964 New Year Honours. He then served as Vice-Adjutant-General at the Ministry of Defence from 3 December 1964 until 1 February 1968. He was then appointed Deputy Chief of the Imperial General Staff on 1 April 1968 and promoted to lieutenant-general the same day (with seniority from 20 October 1968). He was promoted to Knight Commander of the Order of the British Empire (KCB) in the 1968 Queen's Birthday Honours. He stepped down as deputy chief of staff on 31 December 1968, as the position was abolished, along with its equivalents in the Royal Navy, and Royal Air Force.

Freeland held the honorary appointment of Deputy Colonel of the Royal Anglian Regiment (successor to the Royal Norfolk Regiment) with specific responsibility for the Norfolk, Suffolk and Cambridgeshire components of the regiment from 1968, and was appointed colonel of the regiment on 4 October 1971, relinquishing the appointment on 1 October 1976.

== Northern Ireland ==
In the middle of August 1969, the decision was made to reinforce the Royal Ulster Constabulary in Northern Ireland with army personnel. Freeland had been appointed general officer commanding on 9 July 1969, during a relatively peaceful time in the early Troubles, when just 1,000 British troops were stationed there, and was subsequently made director of operations in security matters on 28 August. By mid-August, there had been major rioting. Troop levels had reached about 6,000, and Freeland was warning that there was a danger that soldiers would become targets.

Freeland argued strongly for the abolition of the B Specials. Support from the Irish Nationalist population also waned after the shooting of Daniel O'Hagan on 31 July 1970. He received criticism for a television interview he gave, in which he said, "that the Army's patience was not inexhaustible, and that force might have to be met by force". He fully expected to be dismissed from his post, but he was supported by the Prime Minister, Harold Wilson, and the Home Secretary, James Callaghan. By June 1970, troop numbers reached 7,000, largely to meet expected trouble arising from the climax of the "marching season", and the release of Bernadette Devlin from jail.

In the event, no major trouble materialised, perhaps thanks to the precautions put in effect. By September 1970, it was reported that Freeland was to step down at his own request, due to extreme stress. He was succeeded by Vernon Erskine-Crum on 4 February 1971. This proved to be a short-lived appointment as Erskine-Crum suffered a heart attack soon afterwards and was replaced, in turn, by Lieutenant-General Harry Tuzo on 2 March. Freeland was appointed Knight Grand Cross of the Order of the British Empire (GBE) in the 1971 Queen's Birthday Honours, and retired from the army on 21 June 1971.

He correctly predicted a "honeymoon period" after British soldiers were placed on patrol on the streets, though he incorrectly predicted that the peace lines in Belfast were to be temporary.

The peace line will be a very, very temporary affair. We will not have a Berlin Wall or anything like that in this city.

— Lieutenant-General Sir Ian Freeland, 1969

== Retirement ==
After his retirement from the army in 1971, Freeland lived in Dereham, Norfolk. He was appointed a Deputy Lieutenant of Norfolk in 1972, and Vice Lieutenant in 1978.

== Personal life ==
In the late 1930s, while stationed in India, Freeland met Mary Armitage, daughter of General Sir Charles Armitage. During the early stages of World War II, he returned to England with her and, on 2 January 1940, they were married at St. Andrews Church, Kilverstone; they had three children, Charles, born in 1941, Sue, born in 1943, and Henry, born in 1948.

== Bibliography ==
- Bew, Paul; Gillespie, Gordon (1993). Northern Ireland: A Chronology of the Troubles, 1968–1993. Gill & Macmillan. ISBN 0-7171-2081-3.

Military offices
Preceded by Dennis Talbot	GOC 54th (East Anglian) Division/District; 1961–1963	Succeeded by Richard Fyffe
Preceded by Sir Richard Goodwin	GOC East Africa Command; 1963–1964	Succeeded by Post redesignated British Land Forces Kenya and Kenya Army
Preceded by Sir Charles Harington	Deputy Chief of the Imperial General Staff; April – December 1968	Succeeded by Post disbanded
Preceded by Ian Harris	GOC Northern Ireland Command; 1969–1971	Succeeded by Vernon Erskine-Crum
Honorary titles
Preceded by Sir Richard Goodwin	Colonel of the Royal Anglian Regiment; 1971–1976	Succeeded by Jack Dye
