= Alexander Cameron (British Army officer, born 1898) =

British Army general

Lieutenant-General Sir Alexander Cameron KBE CB MC
- Cameron in 1944
- Born: 30 May 1898; Devon, England
- Died: 25 December 1986 (aged 88)
- Military career
- Allegiance: United Kingdom
- Branch: British Army
- Service years: 1916–1954
- Rank: Lieutenant-General
- Service number: 9292
- Unit: Royal Engineers
- Commands: East Africa Command
- Conflicts: First World War; Second World War; Mau Mau Uprising
- Awards: Knight Commander of the Order of the British Empire; Companion of the Order of the Bath; Military Cross

Lieutenant-General Sir Alexander Maurice Cameron KBE CB MC (30 May 1898 – 25 December 1986) was a senior British Army officer who served as General Officer Commanding (GOC) East Africa Command.

== Military career ==
After attending the Royal Military Academy, Woolwich, Cameron was commissioned into the Royal Engineers in February 1916. He served in World War I in France and Belgium taking part in the Battle of Passchendaele for which he received the Military Cross (MC). The citation for his MC reads:

For conspicuous gallantry and devotion to duty in taping out a strong point, during which he was wounded in nine places. He set out through heavy shell fire to meet his working party in order to prevent them coming forward until the fire had slackened. He missed them in the darkness and owing to weakness from loss of blood had to rest in a trench, sending his N.C.O. with instructions to the party. Later, he again tried to reach his men, but could not do so owing to his serious condition. He refused to go to the aid post until he had ascertained at dawn what had happened to his men. His pluck and devotion to duty are worthy of the highest praise.

After the War he attended the Staff College, Camberley from 1928 to 1929, alongside fellow students such as John Harding, Gerald Templer, Richard McCreery, Gordon MacMillan, Gerard Bucknall and Alexander Galloway, Cameron was deployed to South Persia and then took part in operations in Kurdistan. He became a brigade major in India in 1934 and then a General Staff Officer in the Anti-Aircraft Corps in 1936.

He served in World War II initially as a General Staff Officer with Anti-Aircraft Command and then as Commander of an anti-aircraft brigade from 1942. He was on the staff of Supreme Headquarters, Allied Expeditionary Force from 1944 to 1945. At this time he started constructing an Allied version of the V-2 rocket.

After the War he became Commander of the Special Projectile Operations Group (SPOG) at Cuxhaven which took control of the German guided missile installations. He then became Deputy Quartermaster General for the Royal Engineers in 1945 and Major-General in charge of Administration for Middle East Land Forces in Egypt in 1948.

He was appointed General Officer Commanding East Africa Command in 1951 and, following the Mau Mau Uprising in 1952, was replaced by General Sir George Erskine, becoming Erskine's Second in Command in 1953; he retired in 1954.

He was Director of Civil Defence for South East Region in the UK from 1955 to 1960.

== Bibliography ==
- Smart, Nick (2005). Biographical Dictionary of British Generals of the Second World War. Barnesley: Pen & Sword. ISBN 1844150496.

Military offices
Preceded by Sir Arthur Dowler	GOC East Africa Command; 1951−1953	Succeeded by Sir George Erskine
