= Alan MacDougall Ritchie =

British Army general (1893–1964)

Brigadier Alan MacDougall Ritchie DSO OBE
- Born: 25 June 1893
- Died: 30 April 1964 (aged 70)
- Military career
- Allegiance: United Kingdom
- Branch: British Army
- Rank: Brigadier
- Unit: Argyll and Sutherland Highlanders
- Commands: 21st (East Africa) Infantry Brigade (1941–43); 26th (East Africa) Infantry Brigade (1941); 1st Battalion, Argyll and Sutherland Highlanders (1937–1939); 1st Battalion, Royal Scots (1918–1919)
- Conflicts: First World War; Arab revolt in Palestine; Second World War
- Awards: Distinguished Service Order; Officer of the Order of the British Empire; Mentioned in Despatches; Order of the Redeemer (Greece)

Brigadier Alan MacDougall Ritchie, DSO, OBE (25 June 1893 – 30 April 1964) was an officer in the British Army during the First and the Second World Wars.

== Military career ==
Ritchie was educated at Highgate School and attended the Royal Military College, Sandhurst, from where he graduated in September 1912.

During the First World War he was a captain in the Argyll and Sutherland Highlanders, was mentioned in despatches and awarded the Greek Order of the Redeemer.

Ritchie was appointed commanding officer of the 1st Battalion, Royal Scots from 1918 to 1919 and of the 1st Battalion, Argyll and Sutherland Highlanders in 1937. He was awarded a Distinguished Service Order for service in Palestine in 1939, and became commander of the 26th (East Africa) Infantry Brigade and the 21st (East Africa) Infantry Brigade in the King's African Rifles during the East African Campaign. As commander of the 21st (East Africa) Brigade (11th African Division), Ritchie was detached to 1st South African Division from 27 February until 6 April and, thereafter, to the 12th African Division.

His younger brother, Neil, also served in the Army and rose to command Eighth Army in the North African Campaign.

== Later life ==
Ritchie was Assistant Commissioner in Chief of the St John Ambulance Brigade from 1950 to 1957 and was appointed an Officer of the Order of the British Empire in the 1958 Birthday Honours.
