= East Africa Command =

- Formation Sign
- Active: 1940–1963
- Country: United Kingdom
- Branch: British Army
- Type: Command
- Part of: Middle East Land Forces (1947–1963)
- Garrison/HQ: Nairobi

East Africa Command was a Command of the British Army. Until 1947 it was under the direct control of the Army Council and thereafter it became the responsibility of Middle East Command. It was disbanded on 11 December 1963, the day before Kenya became independent, and replaced by British Land Forces Kenya, tasked with withdrawing all remaining British troops. All remaining troops left by December 1964 and British Land Forces Kenya was disestablished.

== 1930s ==
In the late 1930s the British King's African Rifles (KAR) in East Africa were expanded. Beyond the existing infantry units, a large number of ancillary units and subunits were established in 1939.

== Second World War ==
Playfair et al write that on the outbreak of war with Italy (10 June 1940) Major-General Douglas Dickinson, Inspector-General of the African Colonial Forces, was appointed General Officer Commanding East Africa Force. It comprised "..two East African brigades [former Northern and Southern Brigades, mostly made up of the KAR], an East African reconnaissance regiment, a light battery and the 22nd Mountain Battery R.A. from India. The task given to him by General Wavell, the Commander-in-Chief, Middle East, was to "defend Kenya and without compromising that defence to contain as many Italians as possible on his front". Skirmishes with the Italians began on the northern border of Kenya Colony at Moyale by June 1940; the East African Campaign (World War II) was underway.

Dickinson's force drew troops from Kenya, Tanganyika, Nyasaland (British Central Africa), Northern Rhodesia, and Southern Rhodesia, and reinforcements began to arrive from South Africa and the Royal West African Frontier Force in West Africa. With some of the West African reinforcements, two weak divisions were created on 19 July. The 1st (African) Division, with the Nigerian and 1st East African Brigade Groups [Kenya/Uganda KAR], took over the coastal and Tana sector of the defences. The 2nd (African) Division made up of the Gold Coast and 2nd East African [Tanganyika KAR] Brigade Groups, became responsible for the northern border of Kenya Colony facing Ethiopia.

East African Force was upgraded in status to a Command in September 1941 commanded by General Sir William Platt, covering North East Africa, East Africa and British Central Africa (Nyasaland). Until 1944 it directed the British Military Mission to Ethiopia.

123rd Heavy Anti-Aircraft Regiment, Royal Artillery (TA) was formed at Kings Park in February 1941. The Regiment served in Anti-Aircraft Command until moving to East Africa in November 1942. It was re-designated as 16 (East Africa) Heavy Anti-Aircraft Regiment, East African Artillery, in June 1943. The Regimental Headquarters was disbanded in September 1944.

== Post war ==
Between 1947 and 1950 Mackinnon Road was the site of a large British engineering and Ordnance Depot designed to hold 200,000 tons of military stores. The British had anticipated the loss of military bases in Egypt due to a rise in nationalism there and needed somewhere for the stores from the Suez Canal Zone. The plan was abandoned and the base became a detention camp for Mau Mau suspects until 1955.

A team from 68 Supply Depot, East Africa Army Service Corps, Mombasa, won the Middle East Land Forces East Africa Command and Mombasa Area Challenge Shields Messing and Cookery Competition in 1949.

Soon after the arrival of the Lancashire Fusiliers (and Sir Evelyn Baring), the command was reorganized, losing responsibility for some units. The new Central African Federation was assuming responsibility for KAR units in Northern Rhodesian and Nyasaland.

The command established its own intelligence network during the Mau Mau Uprising in 1952. During the repression of the Mau Mau the command controlled the 39th Infantry Brigade, 49th Infantry Brigade and the 70th (East African) Infantry Brigade. In February 1953, 39 Brigade was warned to be ready to go to Kenya. At a strength of two battalions, 1st Buffs being joined by 1st Battalion, The Devonshire Regiment, it arrived in April 1953 and was soon deployed in the Rift Valley, commanded by Brigadier J.W. Tweedie. After over a year of operations, the Buffs and Devons were withdrawn and relieved in December 1954 and January 1955, respectively. Reliefs were 1st Battalion King's Own Yorkshire Light Infantry and 1st Battalion The Rifle Brigade. 39th Infantry Brigade left Kenya in 1956 for Northern Ireland. On arrival in Kenya 49 Brigade took under command the White-raised territorial Kenya Regiment.

Units in Kenya from 1952-56 included the Battle School, Tracker School, Kenya Regiment Training Centre and Heavy Battery. Police organisations listed included the Kenya Police, Kenya Police Reserve, Kenya Police Reserve Air Wing, Auxiliary Forces, Dobie Force (disbanded) and General Service Units. KAR battalions listed included 3 KAR (Kenya), 4 KAR (Uganda), 5 KAR (Kenya), 6 and 26 KAR (Tanganiyka, though later 26 KAR was only two companies strong), and 7 & 23 KARs (Kenya). Significant brutality and torture were used by the security forces.

There were a total of eleven British infantry battalions (including the 1st Battalion, the Lancashire Fusiliers and 1 RHR), 39 Corps Engineer Regiment RE, 73 Indian Field Engineer Squadron RE, Road building Section RE, Royal Army Veterinary Corps Tracker Dogs, RAMC Unit Hospital Nairobi, Nyeri, Nanyuki, together with No. 1340 Flight RAF (North American Harvards).

The 24th Infantry Brigade maintained a common intelligence system across East Africa until October 1964 when it was withdrawn and moved to Aden.

=== British Land Forces Kenya ===
East Africa Command was disbanded, seemingly on 11 December 1963, the day before Kenyan independence, and replaced by British Land Forces Kenya the next day. Keesing's Contemporary Archives wrote that continued unrest in the north-east region of Kenya in late 1963 prompted President Kenyatta to

..call an urgent Cabinet meeting, also attended by Major-General Ian Freeland (G.O.C., British Land Forces, Kenya) and Mr. Richard Catling (Inspector-General of Police), at Gatundu on Dec. 25, 1963. After the meeting the Government proclaimed a state of emergency throughout the Region and set up a five-mile-deep prohibited zone along the Kenya-Somalia border, excluding the settlements of Mandera and El Wak.

The 70th (East African) Brigade became the basis for the independent Kenya Army. Three King's African Rifles battalions, three attached training companies, a brigade headquarters, 1 Signal Squadron, 91 General Transport Company, workshops, and a variety of other Combat service support units were handed over to the new Kenya Army during the process of independence for Kenya in December 1963 and January 1964.

24th Infantry Brigade was involved in the British response to indigenous army mutinies which sprang up in Zanzibar, Tanzania, in the Uganda Army and Kenya itself from January 1964. The Zanzibar Revolution broke out on 12 January 1964. A week later, two battalions of the Tanganyika Rifles mutinied on 19-20 January 1964. When the Tanganyikan soldiers rose, 2nd Battalion Scots Guards, part of 24th Infantry Brigade, was in Aden for training. Back in Kenya three units of 24th Infantry Brigade were on varying degrees of alert: 1st Battalion, the Staffordshire Regiment at Kahawa with a company afloat aboard the frigate HMS Rhyl standing by near Zanzibar; 3rd Regiment Royal Horse Artillery at Alanbrooke Barracks at Gilgil and 1st Battalion Gordon Highlanders, though the Gordons' advance party had already returned to Edinburgh. 2nd Scots Guards was quickly returned to Kahawa. After the Uganda Army mutiny on 23 January 1964, 1st Battalion, Staffordshire Regiment, with an attached company of the Scots Guards, was quickly dispatched to Jinja.

Timothy Parsons wrote,

...military authorities in Kenya took [the 1964 mutinies in Tanganyika and Uganda] very seriously and quickly developed plans to deal with a similar incident. .. As a result, [Major General Ian Freeland] had considerably more resources at his disposal to prevent and contain potential problems in the Kenyan soldiery. Once Lieutenant Colonel Mans gave [HQ East Africa Command] a careful account of how trouble had broken out in the Tanganyika Rifles, Freeland ordered the Kenyan Special Branch to step up its surveillance of key army units.

This did not prevent trouble breaking out on 24 January 1964 within 11 Kenya Rifles at Lanet Barracks near Nakuru. The uprising was quickly repressed and courts-martial ordered; 11 Kenya Rifles was eventually disbanded.

The Gordon Highlanders appears to have finished their return home to Edinburgh in January 1964. 3 Regiment Royal Horse Artillery left Gilgil in September 1964. Headquarters 24th Infantry Brigade left for Aden in October 1964. The last British unit to depart Kenya was 1st Battalion, Staffordshire Regiment, on 10 December 1964. British Land Forces Kenya ceased to exist on 12 December 1964, and all British Army forces, apart from "a small administrative rear element" left the country. Anti-"Shifta" (anti-pro-independence Northern Frontier District Somali partisans) operations continued, but now under Kenya Army control. In Major General William Dimoline's papers at King's College London there is a typescript report from Brigadier M J D'A. Blackman on the closing down of British Land Forces Kenya, circa May 1965.

== Commanders-in-Chief ==
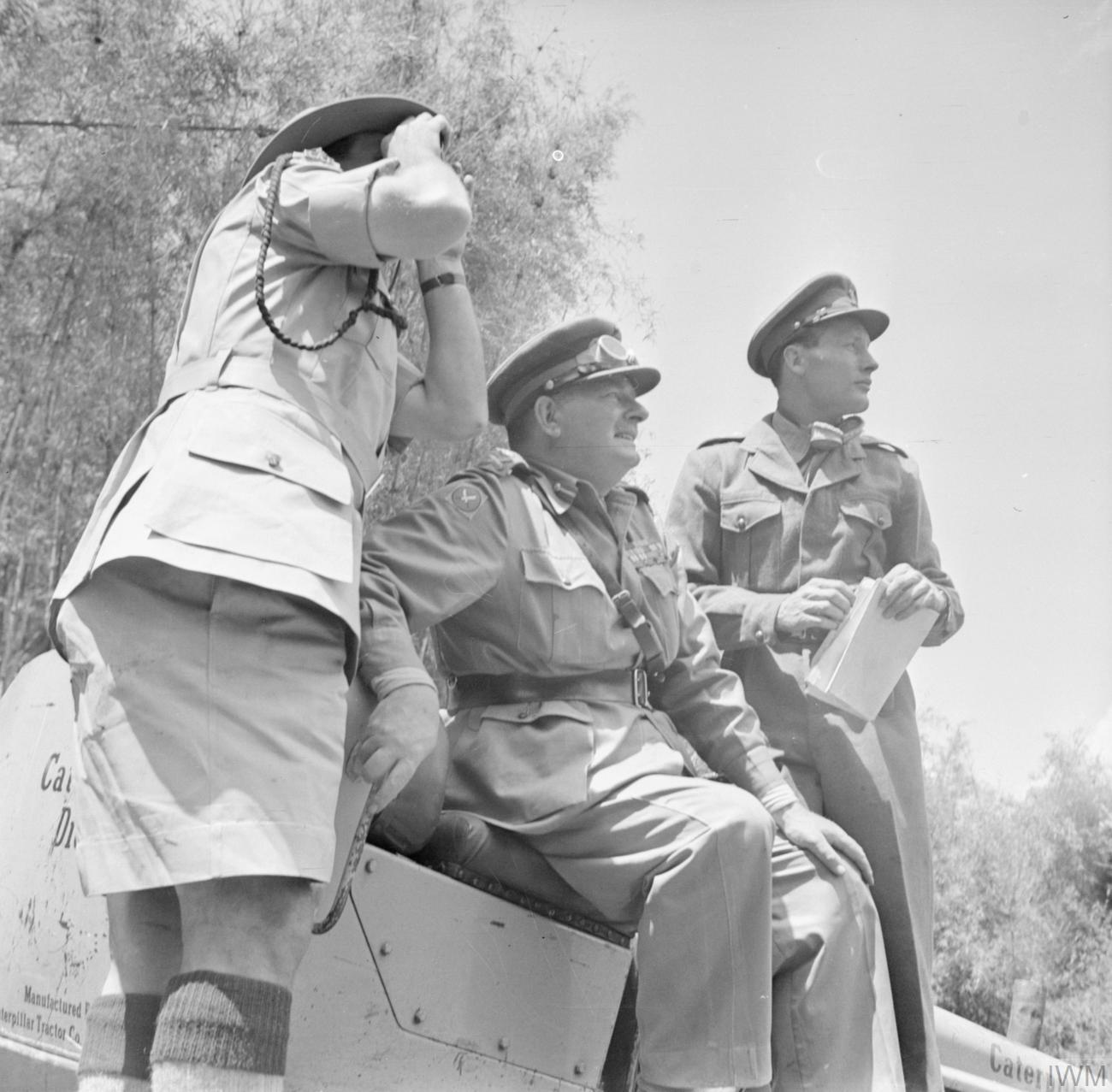
Lieutenant General Sir George Erskine, Commander-in-Chief, East Africa Command (centre), observing operations against the Mau Mau.

Commanders-in-Chief included:
GOC East Africa Force

- c. September 1939–1940 Lieutenant General Douglas Dickinson
- 1940–1941 Lieutenant General Sir Alan Cunningham
- Aug – Dec 1941 Major-General Harry Wetherall

GOC East Africa Command

- 1941–1945 Lieutenant General Sir William Platt
- 1945–1946 Lieutenant General Sir Kenneth Anderson
- 1946–1948 Major General William Dimoline
- 1948–1951 Lieutenant General Sir Arthur Dowler
- 1951–1953 Lieutenant General Sir Alexander Cameron
- 1953–1955 General Sir George Erskine
- 1955–1957 Lieutenant General Sir Gerald Lathbury
- 1957–1960 Major General Sir Nigel Tapp
- 1960–1963 Major-General Sir Richard Elton Goodwin
- 1 November 1963–11 December 1963 Major General Ian Freeland

GOC British Land Forces Kenya

- 12 December 1963 - 28 November 1964 Major General Ian Freeland.
