= Commander-in-Chief, Ceylon =

Commander of all British forces in Ceylon during World War II

The Commander-in-Chief, Ceylon was a military post created during World War II to form a unified command for all British military, naval and air units in Ceylon. The first to be appointed to this post was Admiral Sir Geoffrey Layton, whose powers exceeded that of the governor, in 1942. He was succeeded by Lieutenant General Sir Harry Wetherall in 1945.

No.	Portrait	Rank	Name	Appointment	Left office
1		Admiral	Sir Geoffrey Layton	1942	1945
2		Lieutenant General	Sir Harry Wetherall	1945	1946

== See also ==
- Sri Lanka Army
- Commander of the Army
- General Officer Commanding, Ceylon
