= 9th (Highland) Infantry Division =

9th (Highland) Division
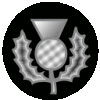
- An example of the divisional insignia. The historian Michael Chappell wrote that the division used "the divisional sign of the Great War 9th (Scottish) Div., a silver thistle on a blue background."
- Active: 27 August 1939 – 7 August 1940
- Country: United Kingdom
- Branch: Territorial Army
- Type: Infantry
- Role: Home defence, training, construction
- Size: 5–10,000 men (June 1940) (Note: The war establishment, the on-paper strength, for an infantry division during 1939 was 13,863 men. For further information on how division sizes changed during the war, see British Army during the Second World War.)

Commanders
- Notable commanders: Alan Cunningham

The 9th (Highland) Infantry Division was an infantry division of the British Army, formed just prior to the start of the Second World War. In March 1939, after the re-emergence of Germany as a significant military power and its occupation of Czechoslovakia, the British Army increased the number of divisions in the Territorial Army (TA) by duplicating existing units. The 9th (Highland) was formed in August 1939, as a second-line duplicate of the 51st (Highland) Infantry Division. The division's battalions were all raised in the Scottish Highlands.

It was intended that the division would remain in the United Kingdom to complete training and preparation, before being deployed to France within twelve months of the war breaking out. Instead, the division was dispersed in order to protect strategically important Royal Navy bases throughout Scotland, including the main base at Scapa Flow. This separation impeded the division's ability to train, leaving the formation ill-trained and ill-prepared by the time the Battle of France begun. As a result of the rapid German victory on mainland Europe in 1940, the division was not deployed overseas.

The fighting in France resulted in the surrender of the majority of the 51st (Highland) Infantry Division, with only elements of one brigade able to escape to Britain. As a morale boost to the 9th Division's troops, and to the public at large who held the 51st in high esteem, it was decided to recreate the 51st Division by renumbering the 9th. On 7 August 1940, the 9th (Highland) Infantry Division was re-designated 51st (Highland) Infantry Division. Two of the 9th Division's brigades were renumbered to match the ones lost in France, while the remaining brigade was merged with 51st Division survivors. The new 51st Division went on to fight in North Africa, Sicily, Italy, and across North-West Europe. The 9th (Highland) Infantry Division was not re-raised during or after the war.

== Background ==
During the 1930s, tensions increased between Germany and the United Kingdom and its allies. In late 1937 and throughout 1938, German demands for the annexation of Sudetenland in Czechoslovakia led to an international crisis. To avoid war, the British Prime Minister Neville Chamberlain met with German Chancellor Adolf Hitler in September and brokered the Munich Agreement. The agreement averted a war and allowed Germany to annexe the Sudetenland. Although Chamberlain had intended the agreement to lead to a peaceful resolution of further issues, relations between both countries soon deteriorated. On 15 March 1939, Germany breached the terms of the agreement by invading and occupying the remnants of the Czech state.

On 29 March, British Secretary of State for War Leslie Hore-Belisha announced plans to increase the size of the Territorial Army (TA), a reserve force of the regular army made up of part-time volunteers, from 130,000 to 340,000 men and double the number of TA divisions. (Note: By 1939, the TA's intended role was to be the sole method of expanding the size of the British Armed Forces. (This was comparable to the creation of Kitchener's Army during the First World War). First-line territorial formations would create a second-line division using a cadre of trained personnel and, if needed, a third division would be created. All TA recruits were required to take the general service obligation: if the British Government decided, territorial soldiers could be deployed overseas for combat. (This avoided the complications of the First World War-era Territorial Force, whose members were not required to leave Britain unless they volunteered for overseas service.)) The plan was for existing TA divisions, referred to as the first-line, to recruit over their establishments, aided by an increase in pay for Territorials, the removal of restrictions on promotion which had hindered recruiting, the construction of better-quality barracks, and an increase in supper rations. The first-line divisions would then form a new division, referred to as the second-line, from cadres. This process was dubbed "duplicating". The 9th (Highland) was a second-line unit, a duplicate of the first-line 51st (Highland) Infantry Division. In April, limited conscription was introduced. This resulted in 34,500 twenty-year-old men being conscripted into the regular army, initially to be trained for six months before deployment to the forming second-line units. It was envisioned that the duplicating process and recruiting the required numbers of men would take no more than six months. Some TA divisions had made little progress by the time the Second World War began; others were able to complete this work within a matter of weeks.

== History ==
=== Formation and home defence ===
The 51st (Highland) Infantry Division created the 26th Infantry Brigade as a second line duplicate of the 152nd Infantry Brigade; the 27th Infantry Brigade as a second line duplicate of the 153rd Infantry Brigade; and the 28th Infantry Brigade as a second line duplicate of the 154th Infantry Brigade. On 25 August, the 26th Brigade became active and was assigned its commanding officer. Two days later, the 9th (Highland) Infantry Division was activated, made up of the 26th Brigade; the 27th and 28th Brigades were assigned as they became active over the following two days. All of the division's troops came from Highland regiments. The 26th Brigade consisted of the 5th and 7th Battalions, Seaforth Highlanders, and the 5th Battalion, Queen's Own Cameron Highlanders. The 27th Brigade included the 5th Battalion, Black Watch, and the 7th and 9th Battalions, Gordon Highlanders. The 28th Brigade was formed with the 7th Battalion, Black Watch, and the 10th and 11th Battalions, Argyll and Sutherland Highlanders. The division's first general officer commanding (GOC) was Major-General George Lindsay, who had been called out of retirement.

At the end of the First World War, Rosyth had been the main base of the Royal Navy (RN). Until 1938, all three services of the British military had agreed that it should remain so in the event of war. In April 1938, the Admiralty recognised that the Firth of Forth was vulnerable against the deployment of enemy naval mines, which would present a danger to ships, and impede the fleet's ability to intercept German ships attempting to steam into the Atlantic, and made the decision to move the main base of the RN's primary fleet (the Home Fleet) to Scapa Flow. Rosyth would remain an important base for the RN, and home to one of four naval shore commands that were established, responsible for control of coastal waters and inspecting intercepted shipping. Likewise, vital RN fleet support installations existed at Invergordon. At the outbreak of the war, the division was assigned to Scottish Command. The division's brigades were not kept intact, and the infantry battalions were dispersed across Scotland to protect these RN assets.

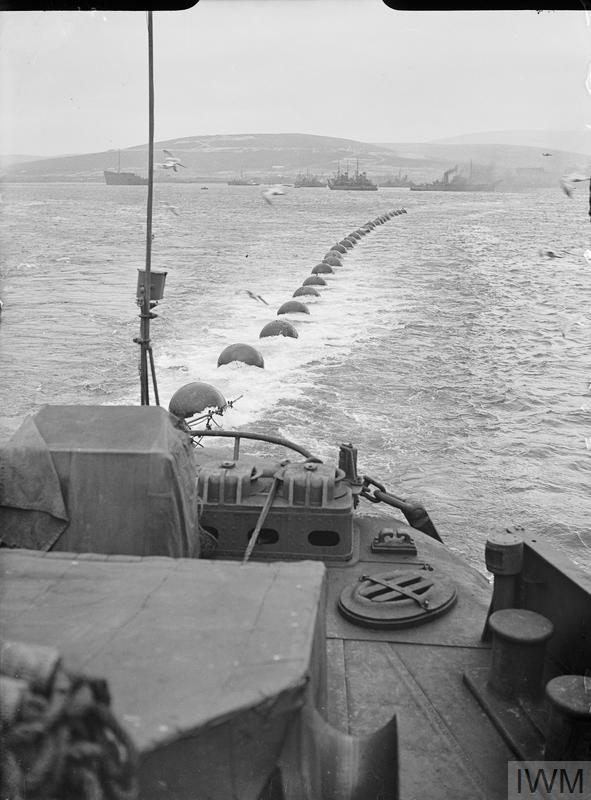
Scapa Flow, the primary base of the Royal Navy, where part of the division was deployed to protect. An example of the anchorage's boom defence can be seen, as well as several ships at anchor.

Two battalions, the 5th Seaforth and the 7th Gordon Highlanders were dispatched to Orkney to protect the base at Scapa Flow. They were charged with the defence of the islands and the fleet, as well as the protection of vulnerable points. The latter included the gun batteries on the island of Flotta, booms around the anchorage, and communication infrastructure across Orkney. Three battalions were based around Fife, to defend Rosyth. They included the 5th Black Watch, based in Alloa, west of Rosyth. A further three battalions were based near Invergordon to protect the naval facilities, including the 5th Queen's Own Cameron Highlanders, based at Tain north of the Invergordon, which was assigned the task of protecting the fleet's oil containers at Invergordon. The remaining battalion, the 7th Black Watch, was dispersed to protect vulnerable points around Fife and Perthshire, including the Forth Bridge. In addition to these duties, the division was also responsible for training; a responsibility that was impeded by the lack of instructors and the required equipment. The division was also used as a source of reinforcements for other units. For example, the 5th Queen's Own Cameron Highlanders released over 200 men to a sister battalion. These losses were made up over several months, by new waves of recruits and conscripts.

In October 1939, Commander-in-Chief, Home Forces Walter Kirke was tasked with drawing up a defensive plan to defend the United Kingdom from a German invasion, which was codenamed Julius Caesar. (Note: 'Julius' was the codeword to bring troops to a state of readiness within eight hours. The codeword 'Caesar' meant an invasion was imminent, and units were to be readied for immediate action. Kirke's plan assumed that the Germans would use 4,000 paratroopers, followed by 15,000 troops landed via civilian aircraft once airfields had been secured (Germany only actually had 6,000 such troops), and at least one division of 15,000 troops to be used in an amphibious assault.) In November 1939, the division was assigned a role in this initial defensive plan, which it retained until 1940. The plan envisioned troops in the affected area immediately locating and defeating German parachutists, or cordoning off and thereby immobilising any German forces until the division could be relieved. On 6 March, Lindsay returned to retirement. He was replaced by Major-General Edward Beck, who had been the Director of Personal Services at the War Office. Following the German invasion of Norway, the Admiralty grew concerned at the capability of German airborne forces and the threat they posed to Scapa Flow, or of a large-scale attack against eastern Scotland. Kirke dismissed the feasibility of such an attack, and believed that East Anglia or the south coast were the areas in imminent danger of invasion as a result of the German operations on mainland Europe. Because of the anticipated threat to the south, the 9th (Highland) was left as the sole division in Scotland. It was envisioned that the TA divisions each be deployed intact to reinforce the regular army formations in France as equipment became available, with all 26 TA divisions deployed by the end of the first year of the war. As a result of the tempo of the Battle of France and the Dunkirk evacuation, the division did not leave Britain. On 26 June 1940, Beck was replaced by Major-General Alan Cunningham who had previously commanded the 5th Anti-Aircraft Division and the short-lived 66th Infantry Division.

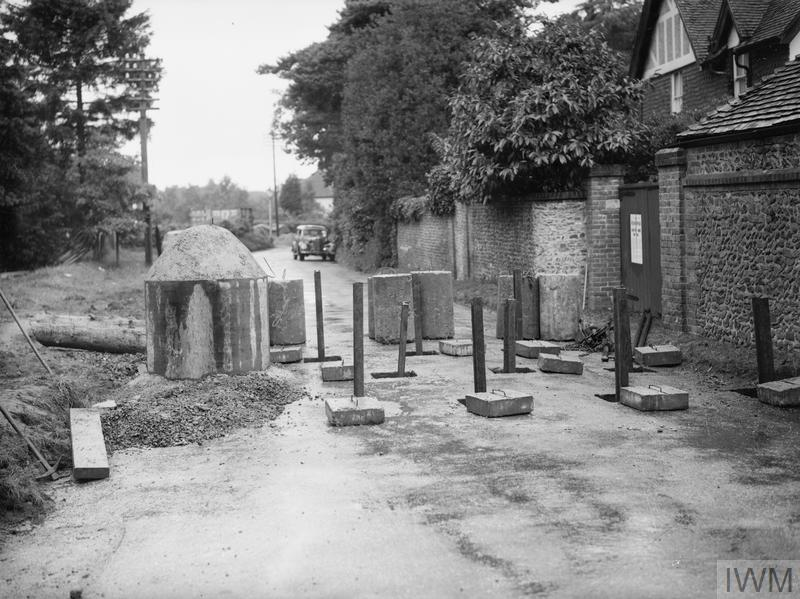
An example of anti-tank obstacles erected during 1940

Following the fall of France, the threat posed to Scotland was re-evaluated. General Edmund Ironside, who had replaced Kirke, decided to bolster the garrison in Scotland. At this point, the division was between 5–10,000 men strong. As of 31 May 1940, ammunition and equipment shortages were common among all divisions based in the UK. Few formations had their full establish of Bren light machine guns, Vickers machine gun, or ML 3-inch mortar. The 9th (Highland) had no anti-tank guns against a nominal establishment of 48, although it did have a full establishment of 307 Boys anti-tank rifles. Ironside relieved the 9th Division of some of its responsibilities by dispatching the 5th Division, and provided both formations with a mobile reserve in the form of the 7th Royal Tank Regiment. Ironside's plan for the defence of the United Kingdom, included the construction of "stoplines". In his words "... strong points prepared for all-round defence at aerodromes ... at the main centres of communication, and distributed in depth over a wide area covering London and the centres of production and supply" with the intent of preventing "the enemy from running riot and tearing the guts out of the country as has happened in France and Belgium." In Scotland, Scottish Command ordered a series of stoplines to be completed. The main line was to run from Dysart, Fife to Loch Tummel, with an additional line built from Cowie, Aberdeenshire inland. These lines were to include wire obstacles, anti-tank barriers, and pillboxes. The 9th (Highland) was to construct the Cowie Line, and aid in the preparation of Scottish Command's other defensive efforts. The division assisted in the construction of beach obstacles, rigged bridges for destruction and established roadblocks. The 274th Field Company, Royal Engineers was vital in the opening stages of the Cowie Line construction. Other changes included the 5th Queen's Own Cameron Highlanders being transferred from Tain to Halkirk. The battalion was assigned to defend RAF Castletown, which provided air cover for Scapa Flow.

=== Disbandment ===
Following the evacuation at Dunkirk, 140,000 British soldiers remained in France. Most were lines-of-communication troops (such as those organised as the Beauman Division), but they included the 51st (Highland) Infantry Division. The latter, on 6 May 1940, had been assigned to the French sector of the front near Saarland, between Colmen and Launstroff, and positioned on the frontline between the border and the Maginot Line. As a result of the German advance during their invasion of France, the division had been cut off from the rest of the BEF. Under French command, the division was withdrawn towards the Somme after initial engagements with German forces on the border. By the time the division had arrived at Bresle, the BEF was already being evacuated via Dunkirk. At this point, the British government was determined to reinforce the French, and prepared to dispatch a new BEF as soon as forces became available. (Note: This would have included the 1st Canadian and the 52nd (Lowland) Infantry Divisions, to supplement the 51st, the Beauman, and the 1st Armoured Divisions still in France. Lieutenant-Genera Alan Brooke was given command. He arrived in Cherbourg on 12 June. The French suggested the formation of a national redoubt in Brittany, using the new BEF and whatever French forces could be mustered. With such a plan impractical, the French Army disintegrating and large numbers of the remaining British forces already evacuated, Brooke fought for an end to further deployments and withdrew what forces he could back to the United Kingdom.) By 9 June, the 51st Division had started to withdraw towards Le Havre, after defending its position at Bresle. The intent was to evacuate the division from there. With this in mind, the 154th Brigade was dispatched to cover the port to facilitate the division's retreat. Within 24 hours, Le Havre and the 154th Brigade had been cut off. The remaining two brigades were ordered towards Saint-Valery. Due to thick fog, which impeded the ability of ships to approach, and German guns that had been positioned to dominate the port, the division was unable to escape and was forced to surrender on 12 June. The 154th Brigade, surrounded at Le Havre, was evacuated on 13 June.

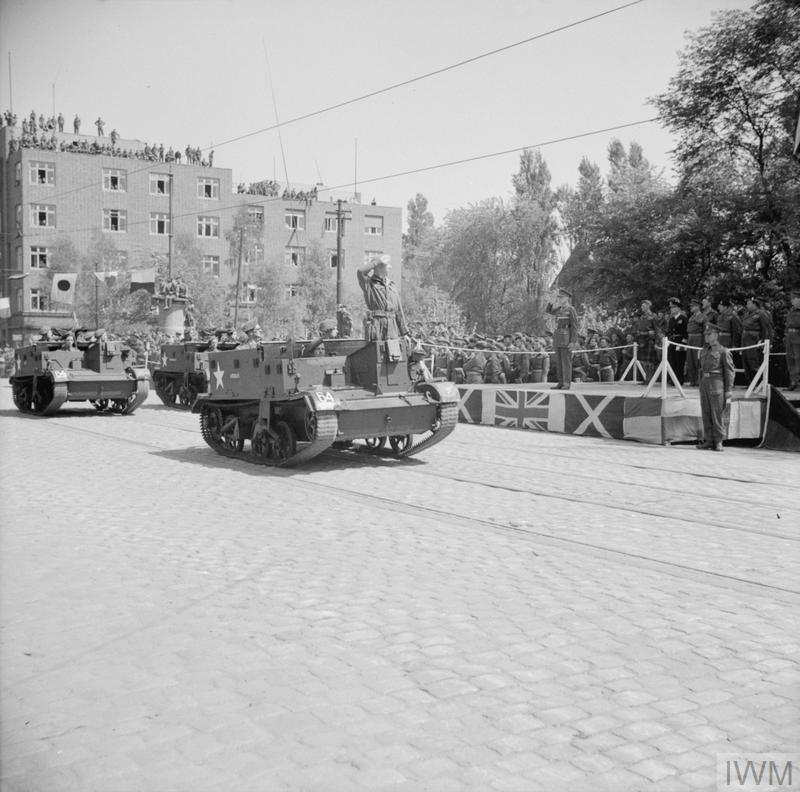
The reconstituted 51st (Highland) Infantry Division, engaging in a victory parade in Germany in 1945.

The historian Craig F. French wrote that the loss of the 51st "came as 'another Flodden' to the Scots nation", gave the men of the 9th (Highland) a desire to avenge their comrades, and resulted in a "profound difference in the attitude of all ranks towards the need for training." Previously, according to the historian David John Newbold, the 9th Division was seen as "a semi-trained, [and] ill-equipped" formation. As a result of the loss, Cunningham agitated for the division to be renamed to re-create the 51st. French wrote

"there was also an important incentive to the War Office to create another Highland Division, since that Division was held in popular esteem in British hearts, and, in view of the reforging of the national army after the battle of France, the Highland Division was to be a vital element in the promotion of a reborn Army."

On 7 August, the 9th (Highland) Infantry Division was re-designated as the 51st (Highland) Infantry Division. As part of this process, the 26th Brigade became the 152nd Brigade, and the 27th Brigade was renumbered the 153rd Brigade. The 154th, which had been under direct War Office control before being assigned to Scottish Command following its escape from France, absorbed the 28th Brigade. The men from the latter were used to bring 154th Brigade's depleted battalions up to full strength.

French wrote, before the renaming of the division, that due to it being "stationed over a wide area, [it] did not have the opportunity to coalesce into a cohesive unit with its feelings of wider divisional loyalties." The renaming of the division "had a significant effect on its troops", which laid the foundations for its future success with the "building of a divisional esprit de corps", and started the process of moulding the division "into a cohesive formation". The new 51st (Highland) Division would go on to fight in the Western Desert campaign, notably at the Second Battle of El Alamein. That was followed by involvement in the Tunisian campaign, the invasion of Sicily, and the opening stages of the Italian campaign. It was then withdrawn to the UK so that it could take part in the Battle of Normandy and the subsequent advance into Germany. The 9th Division was not re-raised during the war, nor when the TA was reformed in 1947. (Note: In 1947, the TA was reformed with the 16th Airborne Division, the 49th (West Riding) and the 56th (London) Armoured Divisions, and the following infantry divisions: 42nd (Lancashire), 43rd (Wessex), 44th (Home Counties), 50th (Northumbrian), 51st/52nd (Scottish), and 53rd (Welsh).)

== General officers commanding ==
Appointed	General officer commanding (GOC)
27 August 1939	Major-General George Lindsay
6 March 1940	Major-General Edward Beck (Note: H.F Joslen states Beck became the divisional commander on 8 March. The London Gazette states he started this post on 6 March.)
26 June 1940	Major-General Alan Cunningham

== Order of battle ==
9th (Highland) Infantry Division

26th Infantry Brigade

- 5th Battalion, Seaforth Highlanders
- 7th Battalion, Seaforth Highlanders
- 5th Battalion, Queen's Own Cameron Highlanders

27th Infantry Brigade

- 5th Battalion, Black Watch
- 7th Battalion, Gordon Highlanders
- 9th Battalion, Gordon Highlanders

28th Infantry Brigade

- 7th Battalion, Black Watch
- 10th Battalion, Argyll and Sutherland Highlanders
- 11th Battalion, Argyll and Sutherland Highlanders

Divisional Troops

- 9th (Highland) Divisional artillery, Royal Artillery
  - 126th (Highland) Field Regiment
  - 127th (Highland) Field Regiment
  - 128th (Highland) Field Regiment
  - 61st (West Highland) Anti-Tank Regiment
- 9th (Highland) Divisional engineers, Royal Engineers
  - 274th Field Company
  - 275th Field Company
  - 276th Field Company
  - 277th Field Park Company
- 9th (Highland) Divisional Signals, Royal Corps of Signals

== See also ==
- List of British divisions in World War II
- British Army Order of Battle (September 1939)
- Independent Company
