= Douglas Graham (British Army officer) =

British Army general (1893–1971)

Major-General Douglas Graham CB CBE DSO* MC DL
- Born: 26 March 1893; Brechin, Angus, Scotland
- Died: 28 September 1971 (aged 78); Brechin, Angus, Scotland
- Burial place: Glasgow Necropolis, Glasgow, Scotland
- Military career
- Allegiance: United Kingdom
- Branch: British Army
- Service years: 1913–1947
- Rank: Major-General
- Service number: 8265
- Units: Royal Field Artillery; Cameronians (Scottish Rifles)
- Commands: British Land Forces Norway (1945); 50th (Northumbrian) Infantry Division (1944–45); 56th (London) Infantry Division (1943); 153rd Infantry Brigade (1940–43); 27th Infantry Brigade (1940); 2nd Battalion, Cameronians (Scottish Rifles) (1937–40)
- Conflicts: First World War; Arab revolt in Palestine; Second World War
- Awards: Companion of the Order of the Bath; Commander of the Order of the British Empire; Distinguished Service Order & Bar; Military Cross; Mentioned in Despatches (4); Commander of the Legion of Merit (United States); Officer of the Legion of Honour (France); Croix de guerre (France); Commander of the Royal Norwegian Order of St. Olav

Major-General Douglas Alexander Henry Graham, CB, CBE, DSO & Bar, MC, DL (26 March 1893 – 28 September 1971) was a senior British Army officer who fought with distinction in both world wars. He is most notable during the Second World War for commanding the 153rd Brigade of the 51st (Highland) Division in North Africa from 1942 to 1943, later being the General Officer Commanding (GOC) of the 56th (London) Infantry Division during the Salerno landings in Italy in September 1943 and the 50th (Northumbrian) Infantry Division during the Normandy landings in France in June 1944.

== Early life and First World War ==
Douglas Graham was born in Brechin, Angus, Scotland, the youngest of three children, on 26 March 1893. He was the son of Mungo MacDougal Graham and Margaret Lyall Murray Graham, and after attending The Glasgow Academy and the University of Glasgow, he was commissioned as a second lieutenant into the 3rd Lowland Brigade, Royal Field Artillery, Territorial Force (TF), on 26 September 1911, but he resigned his commission on 25 September 1912. After attending the Royal Military College, Sandhurst, he was granted a commission in the Regular Army, again with the rank of second lieutenant, on 17 September 1913, into the Cameronians (Scottish Rifles), and was posted to the 1st Battalion of his regiment.

The outbreak of the First World War in August 1914 saw Graham serving as a platoon commander in 'D' Company of the 1st Battalion, Cameronians (Scottish Rifles), commanded by Lieutenant Colonel Philip Robertson, which soon became part of the 19th Brigade, when it was sent to the Western Front as part of the British Expeditionary Force (BEF). Thus Graham's battalion were amongst the first British troops to arrive in France. After participating in the retreat from Mons, on 22 October 1914, during the early stages of the First Battle of Ypres, Graham was involved in an action that would lead to Rifleman Henry May, in Graham's platoon, the award of the Victoria Cross (VC). Whilst in the La Boutillerie area of France, Lieutenant Graham was wounded in the leg. Rifleman May, ignoring orders from Graham to leave him, dragged him, under heavy fire, 300 yards to safety. After May arranged for a rescue party for his platoon commander, and after recovering from his wounds, Graham, promoted on 3 November 1914 to lieutenant, was promoted again to captain on 18 June 1916, returned to France and was appointed as a brigade major with the 182nd Brigade, part of the 61st (2nd South Midland) Division, a Territorial Force (TF) formation, on 30 April 1917, remaining with the brigade during all of its major battles of the war until 7 June 1919. He was awarded the Military Cross (MC) in the 1918 New Year Honours. He finished the war having also been mentioned in despatches and awarded the French Croix de guerre.

== Between the wars ==
The war came to an end on 11 November 1918 where, just under two weeks before, Graham's first son, Mungo Alan Douglas, was born on 29 October. Graham relinquished his appointment as brigade major on 8 June 1919, and returned to regimental duty on 11 January 1920.

From 30 October 1921 he was seconded to the Indian Army as an assistant military secretary with Northern Command, India. He returned to the United Kingdom and attended the Staff College, Camberley from 1924 to 1925 where, among his many fellow students there were Noel Irwin, Daril Watson, Ivor Thomas, Clifford Malden, Cyril Durnford, Michael Creagh, Thomas Riddell-Webster, James Harter, Sydney Rigby Wason, Langley Browning, Frederick Hyland, Otto Lund, Rufus Laurie, Gerald Fitzgerald, Arthur Barstow, John Reeve, Vyvyan Pope, Robert Studdert, Noel Napier-Clavering, Reade Godwin-Austen, Gerald Brunskill, Archibald Nye, George Lammie, Noel Beresford-Peirse, Gerald Gartlan, Geoffrey Raikes, Humfrey Gale, Guy Robinson and Lionel Finch, along with John Northcott of the Australian Army and Ernest Sansom and Maurice Pope of the Canadian Army. All of these men would, like Graham, become general officers in the future. He was then appointed a staff officer with the 52nd (Lowland) Infantry Division, a Territorial Army (TA) formation, from 19 February 1928.

He was promoted to major on 16 December 1930, and from 31 December 1930 to 18 February 1932 he was Deputy Assistant Adjutant & Quarter-Master General (DAA&QMG), Lowland Area, Scottish Command. From 1 May 1932 to 30 April 1935 he was Officer Commanding (OC) the Cameronians regimental depot at Hamilton, South Lanarkshire. In June 1937 he had been promoted lieutenant colonel, and, shortly after the birth of his second son, John Murray Graham, on 7 June, was given command of the 2nd Battalion, Cameronians (Scottish Rifles). The battalion was then stationed in Palestine on internal security duties during the Arab Revolt and returned to England in 1938, where it became part of Brigadier Henry Willcox's 13th Infantry Brigade, part of Major General Harold Franklyn's 5th Infantry Division at Catterick, Yorkshire.

== Second World War ==
Shortly after the outbreak of the Second World War in September 1939, Graham led his battalion overseas to France, arriving there in mid-September as part of the British Expeditionary Force (BEF). Unlike in the First World War, there was no immediate action and the first few months of the "Phoney War" (as this period of time was to become known) were, for the BEF, spent building defensive positions, such as trenches and pillboxes, in expectation of a repeat of the trench warfare of 1914–1918. However, the battalion, along with the rest of the brigade (which was sent to France as an independent formation as the 5th Division was not fully formed by the outbreak of war), were mainly spared these duties, although they were assigned the role of guard duties in the BEF's rear areas, with almost no time devoted to training. In late December the brigade, now commanded by Brigadier Miles Dempsey (who Graham was to serve with later in the war), was returned to the 5th Division when the division HQ arrived in France and, during the next few months, was involved in numerous training exercises.

In early April 1940, however, Graham returned to Scotland and was given command of the 27th Infantry Brigade, part of the 9th (Highland) Infantry Division, a second-line TA formation, with the acting rank of brigadier, and the substantive rank of colonel. In August 1940 Graham's brigade changed its designation to the 153rd Infantry Brigade when the 9th Division was reformed as the 51st (Highland) Infantry Division after the original 51st Division was lost in June 1940 during the latter stages of the Battle of France. The new division's first General Officer Commanding (GOC) was Major General Alan Cunningham, who was replaced in October by Major General Neil Ritchie, the latter being succeeded in June 1941 by Major General Douglas Wimberley, who, being a Cameron Highlander, was determined to keep the division commanded only by Highlanders. Graham, being an officer of a Lowland regiment, was the one exception, with Wimberley believing him to be highly competent and Graham retained his position. The next year was spent training, mainly in Scotland, in preparation for a move overseas.

=== North Africa ===
On 11 June 1942, shortly before the division left for North Africa, Graham was appointed a Commander of the Order of the British Empire (CBE) in that year's King's Birthday Honours. Departing the United Kingdom three days later, on 13 August Graham's brigade arrived in Egypt, where the British Eighth Army, which the 51st Division was to form part of once fully trained and used to desert conditions, had just suffered a major reverse. Thus the division, only recently arrived in the theatre, missed the Battle of Alam el Halfa, but, after a period of training in desert warfare, was called forward to join the Eighth Army at El Alamein, on the orders of Lieutenant General Bernard Montgomery, the new Eighth Army commander, in order to play its part in Montgomery's new offensive. The division was assigned initially to Lieutenant General Brian Horrocks's XIII Corps, before transferring to Lieutenant General Sir Oliver Leese's XXX Corps, which was to play a leading role in the forthcoming offensive.

The offensive, the Second Battle of El Alamein, began on the evening of 23 October, and was supported by a huge artillery barrage. Graham's brigade, given an assault role, quickly took their objectives – of advancing through the Axis minefields to create a passage and enable the armour of Lieutenant General Herbert Lumsden's X Corps to pass through. The advance of Graham's brigade, after quickly overwhelming the defenders who were stunned from the massive artillery barrage, slowed against increasing resistance and the brigade's last objective could not be held, forcing a withdrawal. Consequently, the armour was unable to leave the minefields, and the 51st Division was forced onto the defensive. Montgomery, the army commander, then launched Operation Supercharge on 2 November, although Graham's brigade, given the role of maintaining pressure on the enemy, played a relatively minor role. On 14 January 1943 he was awarded the Distinguished Service Order (DSO) for his actions on 2 November 1942 at El Alamein.

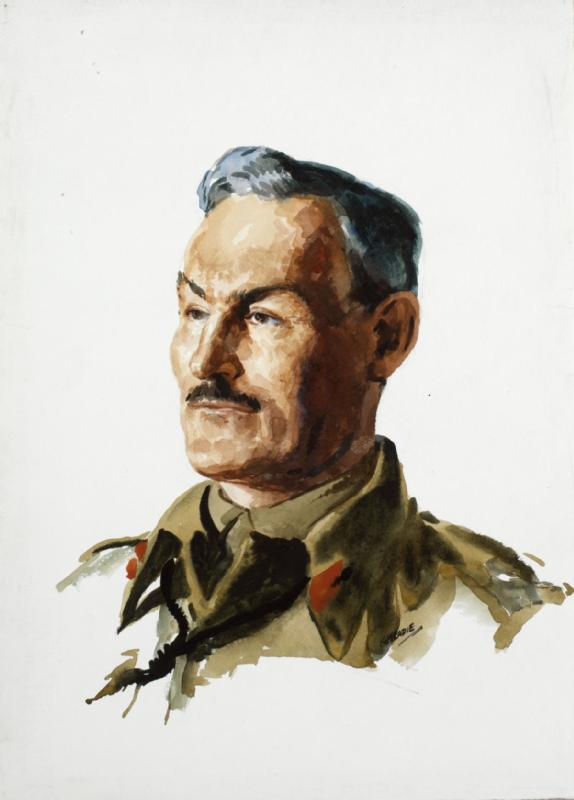
A head and shoulder portrait of Major General Douglas Graham in uniform.

Following Alamein the brigade had a rest for a few weeks, absorbing replacements after suffering heavy losses, with the division as a whole having sustained some 2,800 casualties, and then, with the rest of the Eighth Army pursuing the retreating Axis forces, seeing light action at El Agheila, followed by Buerat. Graham continued to command his brigade as it joined the campaign in Tunisia, where he was involved in actions leading up to Operation Pugilist, in particular an attack on outposts of the Mareth Line on the night of 16/17 March, where his brigade suffered heavy losses due to an anti-tank ditch at Wadi Zigzaou, along with his performance up to the capture of Sfax, which won him a bar to his DSO. The Battle of Wadi Akarit followed soon afterwards, but Graham's brigade was held in reserve and unused, although it later spearheaded the Eighth Army's advance to Enfidaville, reaching near there on 23 April. Soon afterwards the division, selected by Montgomery (now a full general) for participation in the Allied invasion of Sicily, was withdrawn from the front lines into reserve.

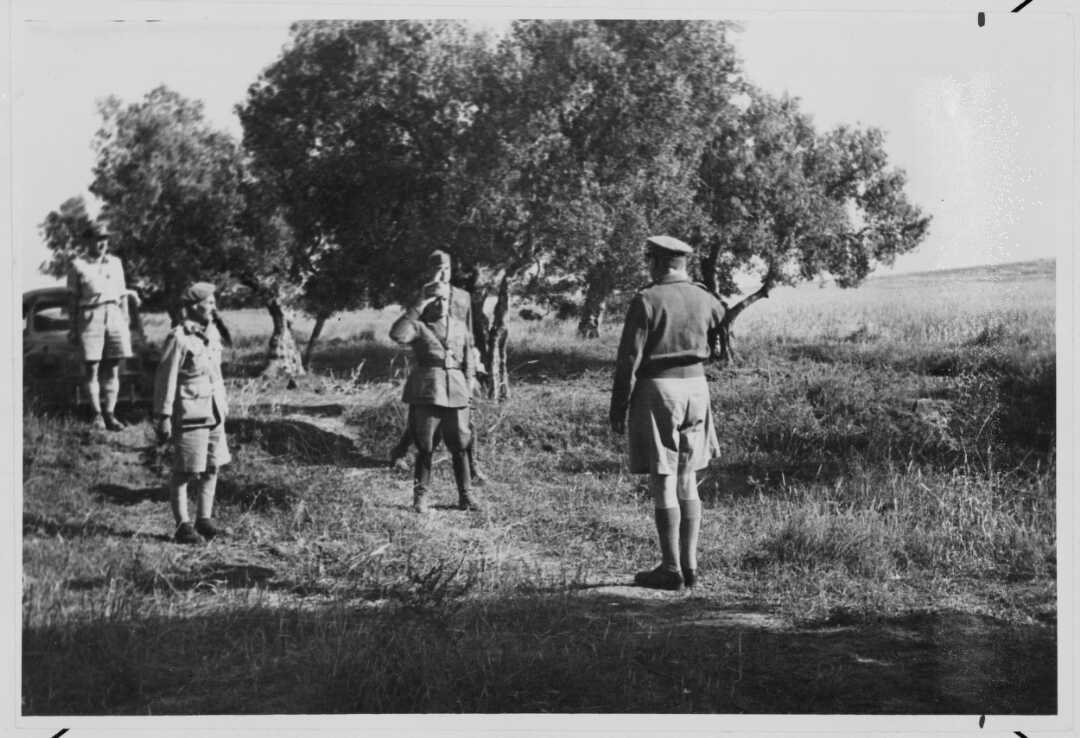
Italian Field Marshal Giovanni Messe surrenders to Lieutenant-General Sir Bernard Freyberg in Tunisia on 13 May 1943, marking the final phase of the fighting in North Africa. Major-General Douglas Graham, the recently appointed GOC 56th Division, is stood near him, wearing a beret.

In early May 1943 Graham was selected by Montgomery (who, along with Wimberley, thought very highly of the former) to be the new GOC of the 56th (London) Infantry Division, another TA formation, with the rank of acting major general, after the division's former GOC, Major General Eric Miles, was severely wounded. The division, with only the 167th and 169th Infantry Brigades and supporting divisional troops under command, had only recently arrived in Tunisia, after travelling some 3,200 miles from Iraq, and was assigned to X Corps, with Brigadier Lewis Lyne's 169th Brigade suffering heavy casualties in an attack on two hills, Points 141 and 130, on 28 April. On the night of 10 May the 167th Brigade was ordered to attack the Italian defenders on the hills north of Takrouna, which, although supported by artillery, failed, due to a combination of tenacious enemy resistance and very heavy shell and mortar fire, the defenders inflicting nearly 400 casualties upon the inexperienced brigade. However, the fighting in Tunisia ceased just three days later, with the surrender of some 238,000 Axis soldiers, many thousands surrendering to Graham's division alone.

=== Italy ===
Graham, along with his division (nicknamed "The Black Cats" due to its divisional insignia), was sent to Libya towards the end of May, where it began training in amphibious warfare, in preparation for the Allied invasion of Italy and, due to its casualties, was unable for participation in the Allied invasion of Sicily. Still with only two brigades (as the 168th Brigade, detached from the 56th Division in April, was temporarily serving with the 50th Division, which Graham would later command, in Sicily), in late July the division was reinforced with the veteran 201st Guards Brigade, under Brigadier Julian Gascoigne, thus bringing the division up to strength with three brigades again. The division was assigned to Lieutenant General Brian Horrock's X Corps, then part of the American Fifth Army under Lieutenant General Mark W. Clark and, although unavailable for Sicily, had been selected for participation in the Allied invasion of Italy and commenced intensive training in amphibious warfare. Three weeks before the invasion the X Corps commander, Brian Horrocks, was severely injured by a lone German aircraft and was replaced soon after by Lieutenant General Sir Richard McCreery.

The 56th Division, supported by Sherman tanks of the Royal Scots Greys (with a squadron attached to each of the division's three brigades), came ashore at Salerno on 9 September 1943, facing light resistance, at least initially. The day before, news was received of the armistice of Cassibile, the Italian surrender, and the Allies hoped resistance at Salerno would be light, although the severity of the fighting over the subsequent days would put paid to that theory. Despite this, the landings themselves had, for the most part, gone smoothly, and only the 16th Panzer Division was nearby, although several other German formations were arriving.

The 56th Division's task was to capture, in addition to Montecorvino airfield, the road between Bellini and Battipaglia, where it was to link up with Major General Fred L. Walker's US 36th Division to the division's right. However, a huge gap seven-mile gap had emerged between Graham's division and Major General Ernest J. Dawley's US VI Corps (of which the US 36th Division formed part), with the River Sele flowing through.

Graham ordered Brigadier Lyne, the 169th Brigade commander, to seize Montecorvino airfield, but, due to stubborn German resistance, and despite support from the Royal Scots Greys, the airfield remained in enemy hands for the next few days. However, the brigade managed to destroy a large number of German aircraft on the ground. The 167th Brigade captured Battipaglia but was repelled by a ferocious German counterattack, in which flamethrower tanks were used, and horrendous losses were sustained, in particular to the 9th Battalion, Royal Fusiliers, with many men being captured. On 11 September, two days after the landings, Graham ordered Brigadier Gascoigne's 201st Brigade to capture the road west of Battipaglia and the tobacco factory to the north of Battipaglia, but the attack failed and the Guardsmen fell back to better defensive positions.

On 13 September the Germans, now with four divisions facing the Allies in the Salerno beachhead, launched a massive counterattack all across the beachhead, although it was focused mainly on the large gap between the Americans and the British. Graham, after consultation with Clark, the army commander, was allowed to retire to good defensive positions, thereby being able to repel the Germans with concentrated artillery fire. It was around this time that the crisis and the danger of the Allies being pushed into the sea being to slacken, and, after further heavy fighting, Battipaglia was taken by the 201st Guards Brigade on 18 September.

The division then cleared the Germans from their positions to the north of Salerno, while the 46th Division and the newly arrived 7th Armoured Division under Major General George Erskine took part in the capture of Naples. It was during this period that Company Sergeant Major Peter Wright of the 3rd Battalion, Coldstream Guards, part of the 201st Brigade, was awarded the Victoria Cross (VC). After this the division (which by now had sustained some 3,000 casualties at Salerno) advanced on the Fifth Army's left flank, eventually reaching the Volturno River, where the Germans had built up a defensive line. However, before the division could cross the river, Graham was injured, via a broken shoulder, on 10 October when his jeep tumbled into a shell crater after visiting his units in the front line. As a result of his performance he was later appointed a U.S. Commander of the Legion of Merit. He became a temporary major general on 14 May 1944. His Italian service also led to him being appointed a Companion of the Order of the Bath (CB) on 24 August 1944. Command of the 56th Division passed temporarily to Brigadier Lyne, the 169th Brigade commander, before Major General Gerald Templer arrived in Italy and became GOC on 15 October.

=== Northwest Europe ===
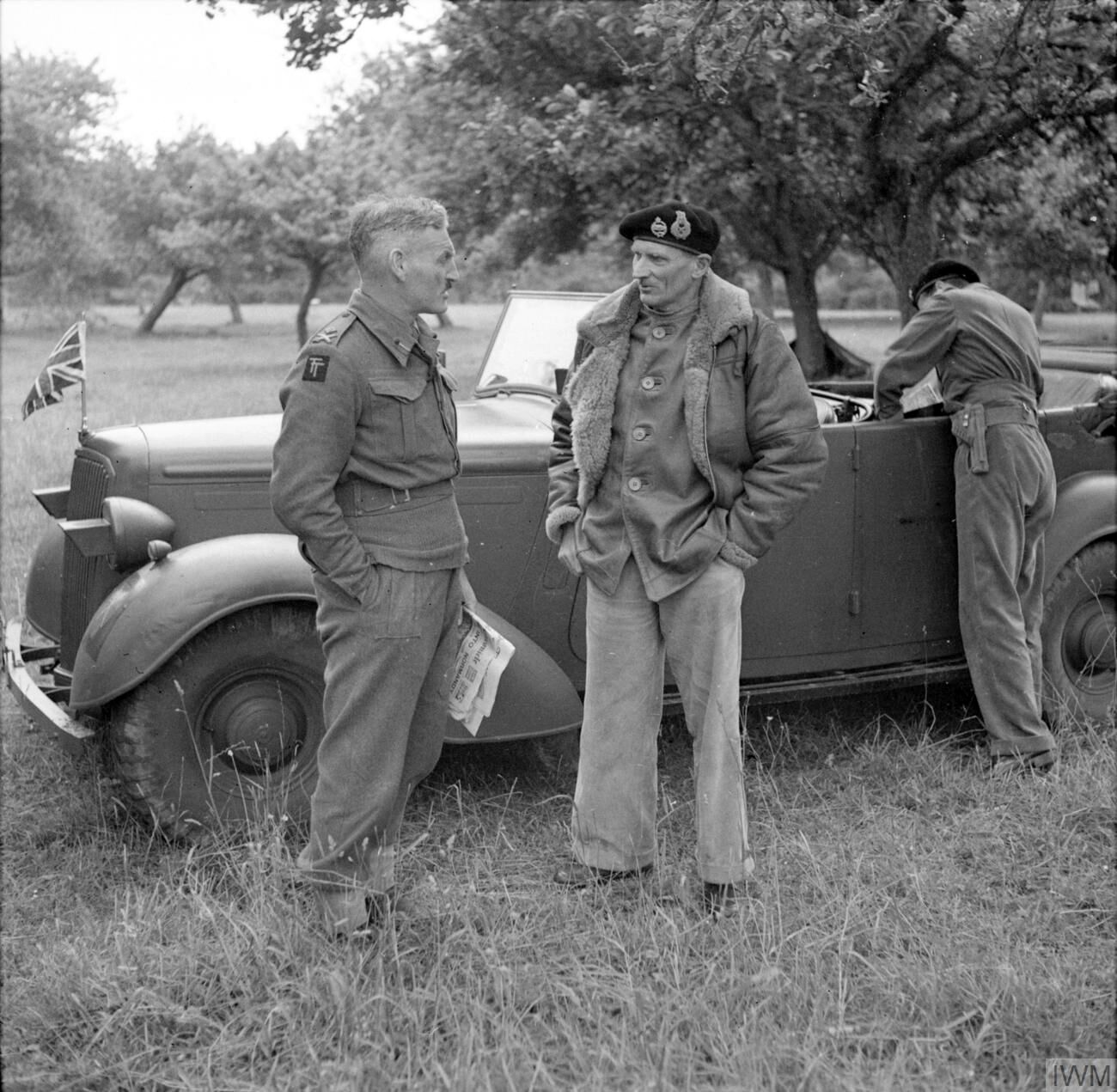
General Sir Bernard Montgomery in conversation with Major General Douglas Graham, GOC 50th (Northumbrian) Infantry Division, pictured here in Normandy, 20 June 1944.

After being evacuated to hospital in the United Kingdom, by January 1944 Graham, after being mentioned in despatches for his service in North Africa and Italy, was judged to be sufficiently recovered from his injuries to be given command of the 50th (Northumbrian) Infantry Division, a highly experienced first-line TA formation which had served with distinction in North Africa and Sicily, in place of Major General Sidney Kirkman, who was being given command of XIII Corps on the Italian front. Even at this stage of the war division GOCs with Graham's extensive battle experience were scarce. Comprising the 69th, 151st and 231st Infantry Brigades along with divisional troops, the 50th Division, with its considerable fighting experience, was brought back from Sicily in November 1943 to spearhead the Allied invasion of Normandy, codenamed Operation Overlord. However, after so much time spent fighting overseas, and, after being informed that the division was to play a leading role in the invasion, (replacing Major General Evelyn Barker's 49th Division, the initial choice) morale in the 50th Division was not high, with many veterans believing they had done more than fair share of the fighting, although morale later improved, due to Graham's leadership. The division was assigned to XXX Corps, under Lieutenant General Gerard Bucknall, which itself was part of the British Second Army, commanded by Lieutenant General Miles Dempsey (Graham's brigade commander in France from 1939 to 1940), and, supported by the 56th Independent Infantry Brigade and the 8th Armoured Brigade, was to land at Gold Beach on D-Day. For the invasion itself Graham had some 38,000 troops, more than twice the average strength of a division, under his command.

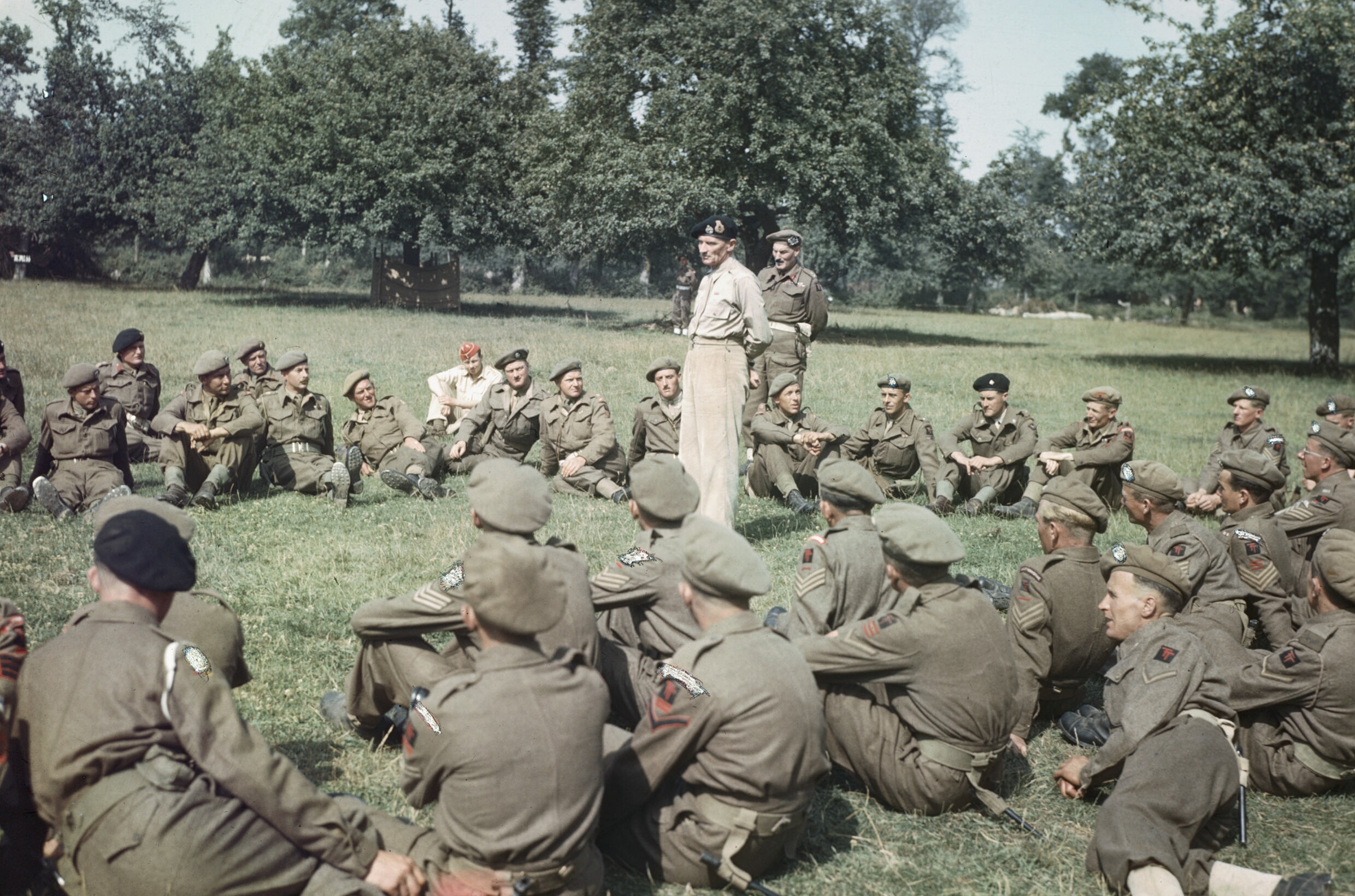
General Sir Bernard Montgomery addressing the men of the 50th Division before decorating them for gallantry during the Normandy landings. Pictured standing just behind him is Major General Douglas Graham, GOC of the 50th Division.

The division fought during the initial beach assault on Gold Beach, where Graham was again mentioned in despatches for his contributions to the campaign, and later was made an Officer of the Legion of Honour. Graham's rank of major general was made substantive on 6 October 1944 (with seniority from 1 February). Landing in Normandy in the early hours of 6 June 1944, the division initially met light resistance on the beaches, and, by the end of D-Day, had penetrated inland as far as Bayeux, the division's main objective, which was occupied the following day. The division also gained, on D-Day, the first and only VC to be awarded to be British or Commonwealth servicemen on the day, belonging to Company Sergeant Major Stanley Hollis of the 6th Battalion, Green Howards. Thereafter resistance stiffened as the 50th advanced to Tilly-sur-Seulles, to be halted by the Panzer Lehr Division, and, after further fierce fighting around Tilly-sur Seulles, the rest of the month for the 50th Division, on the boundary with Lieutenant General Omar Bradley's U.S. First Army, was spent mainly in holding the line, with most of the fighting being centred to the east around the city of Caen.

Progress for the Allied armies in Normandy remained slow, and the 50th Division, towards the end of July, took part in Operation Bluecoat, an attack on Mont Pinçon, which was launched at around the same time as the Americans launched Operation Cobra. After heavy fighting at Amaye-sur-Suelles, the division then captured Villers-Bocage, earning praise from the new XXX Corps commander, Lieutenant General Horrocks (who described Graham in his autobiography as "an old war horse never far from the scene of battle"), and eventually found itself lined up along the northern flank of the Falaise Pocket, where the Germans were now retreating to, and where the Battle of Normandy was, after 2 1/2 months of severe fighting, was finally won and thousands of Germans were captured. During the campaign in Normandy the 50th "Tyne Tees" Division (so nicknamed because of its division insignia, representing the division's pre-war recruiting area) had suffered almost 6,000 casualties, the second highest of any British division in France (the British 3rd Division under Major General "Bolo" Whistler gaining the dubious honour of having suffered the most, with over 7,100 casualties being sustained). However, of the three veteran divisions returned from the Mediterranean in late 1943, the 50th had, in the opinions of Montgomery, Dempsey and Horrocks, performed the best and this was due largely to Graham's leadership.

In the aftermath of the destruction of a large part of the German Army in the West, the Allies began their pursuit of the Germans through France and Belgium to Germany itself (see Allied advance from Paris to the Rhine). 50th Division, however, played a relatively minor role in the pursuit, but, after a brief rest, was ordered to the front once again in early September, where it fought in the Battle of Geel. Again playing only a minor role in Operation Market Garden − Montgomery's attempt to cross the Rhine and end the war before Christmas − the division instead spent the next few weeks garrisoning "The Island", the area between the River Waal and the Lower Rhine, after the operation failed, in turn relieving the 43rd Division, commanded by Major General Ivor Thomas, who had been one of Graham's fellow students at the Staff College in the mid-1920s. On "The Island" static warfare replaced the fast and mobile warfare of the previous few weeks.

In early October Graham received a leg injury and returned to England for recovery, his place as GOC being taken over by Major General Lyne, formerly Graham's senior brigade commander in the 56th Division before taking over the 59th (Staffordshire) Infantry Division. Graham returned to the 50th Division as GOC once again in late November, by which time the War Office had decided to break up the division, although, because of its distinguished history it was reduced to the role of a reserve division. The British Army was, by this stage of the war, suffering from a very severe shortage of manpower, and there simply were not enough men to keep all the active divisions up to strength and this, combined with Montgomery's belief that the division was no longer combat-worthy (and his sudden and harsh assessment of Graham, who he had previously thought very highly of, as being too old and only fit for a training command), was the main reason why the 50th Division was chosen for disbandment. Returning to England in December, the division became a reserve training formation, keeping its three infantry brigades but losing most of its supporting artillery and engineer units, and was given the role of training soldiers who had completed their basic training before being sent to an overseas unit. Graham received a further mention in despatches for "gallant and distinguished services in North West Europe" on 22 March 1945.

In August 1945, with the war in Europe now over, the 50th Division HQ ceased to exist and, upon moving to Norway, was redesignated HQ British Land Forces Norway, with Graham as its GOC. In Norway he was GOC British Land Forces Norway where he convened the trial for war crimes of 10 German soldiers by a Military Court held at the law courts, Oslo, Norway. The accused were charged with committing a war crime, in that they at Ulven, Norway, in or about the month of July 1943, in violation of the laws and usages of war, were concerned in the killing of Lieutenant A. H. Andresen, Petty Officer B. Kleppe, Leading Stoker A. Bigseth, Able Seaman J. Klipper, Able Seaman G. B. Hansen, and Able Seaman K. Hals, Royal Norwegian Navy, and Leading Telegraphist R. Hull, Royal Navy, prisoners of war. For his services to Norway, he was made a Commander of the Royal Norwegian Order of St. Olav.

== Postwar and later life ==
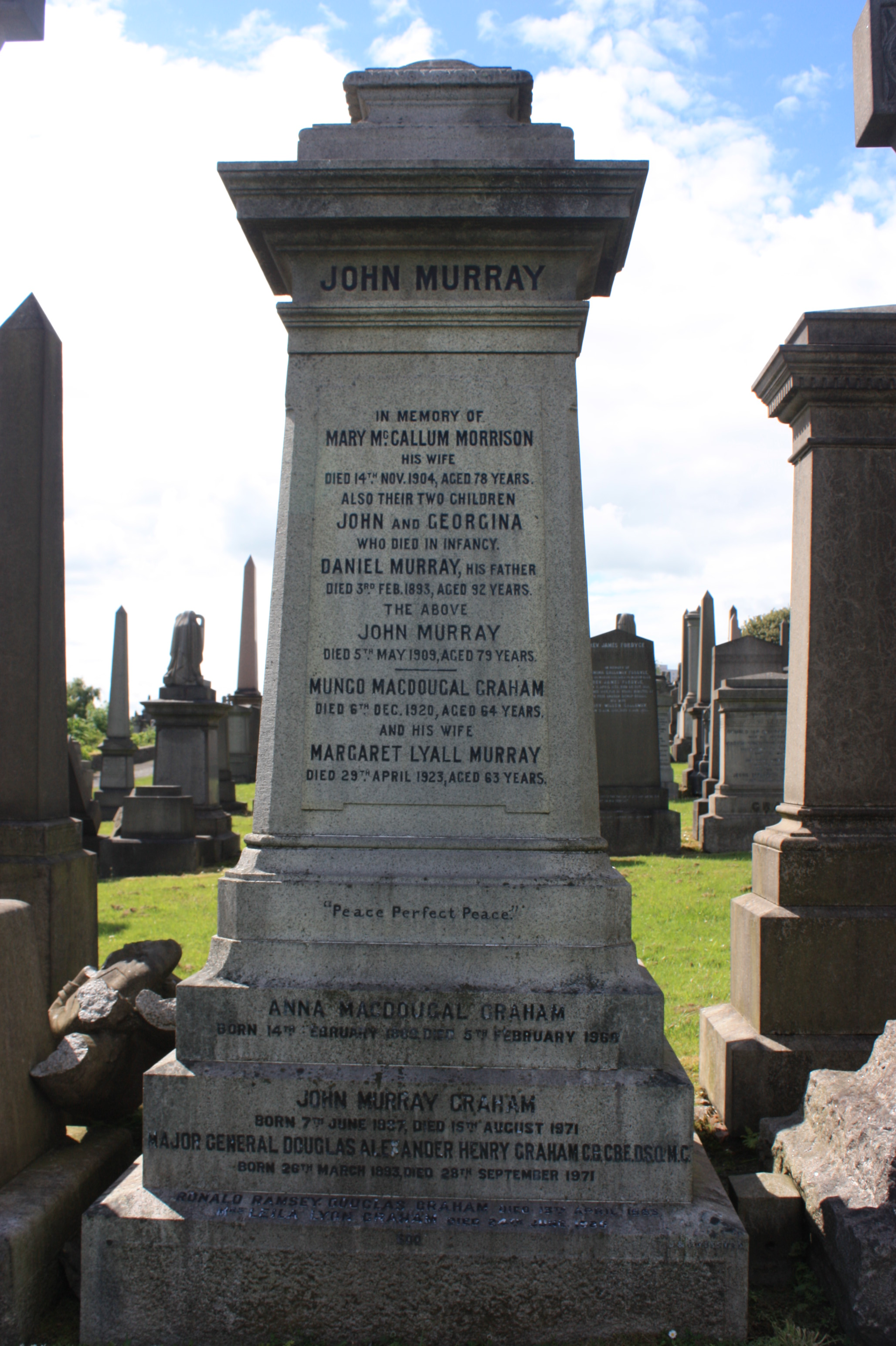
The grave of Major General Douglas Graham, Glasgow Necropolis.

Graham retired from the army on 6 February 1947. Between 22 August 1954 and 26 March 1958 he was the Colonel of the Cameronians (Scottish Rifles). He also served as Deputy Lieutenant of the County of Ross and Cromarty from 11 June 1956 until his resignation on 15 March 1960.

He died on 28 September 1971, a few weeks after the early death of his second son, John Murray Graham. He is buried in the John Murray plot at the top of Glasgow Necropolis.

"Highly respected by his colleagues and subordinates for his positive disposition − in "Gertie" Tuker's words "He seemed in all battles to share with Freyberg of the New Zealanders a cheerful spirit of optimism, so estimable a virtue in a battle commander" − he was a most competent soldier", possessing "firm religious convictions" and "indomitable courage".

== Bibliography ==
- Converse, Alan (2011). Armies of Empire: The 9th Australian and 50th British Divisions in Battle 1939–1945. Cambridge University Press. ISBN 978-0521194808.
- Mead, Richard (2007). Churchill's Lions: a biographical guide to the key British generals of World War II. Stroud (UK): Spellmount. ISBN 978-1-86227-431-0.
- Smart, Nick (2005). Biographical Dictionary of British Generals of the Second World War. Barnesley: Pen & Sword. ISBN 1844150496.
- Williams, David. The Black Cats at War: The Story of the 56th (London) Division T.A., 1939–1945 ISBN 1-870423-89-5.
- The D-Day Encyclopedia. (ed.). Upper Saddle River, NJ: ISBN 978-0132036214.

Military offices
Preceded by Eric Miles	GOC 56th (London) Infantry Division; May–October 1943	Succeeded by Gerald Templer
Preceded by Sidney Kirkman	GOC 50th (Northumbrian) Infantry Division; January–October 1944	Succeeded by Lewis Lyne
Preceded by Lewis Lyne	GOC 50th (Northumbrian) Infantry Division; 1944–1945	Post redesignated British Land Forces Norway
New post	GOC British Land Forces Norway; August–November 1945	Post disbanded
Honorary titles
Preceded by Sir Richard O'Connor	Colonel of the Cameronians (Scottish Rifles); 1954–1958	Succeeded by Sir Horatius Murray
