= Humfrey Gale =

British Army general (1890–1971)

Lieutenant-General Sir Humfrey Gale KBE CB CVO MC
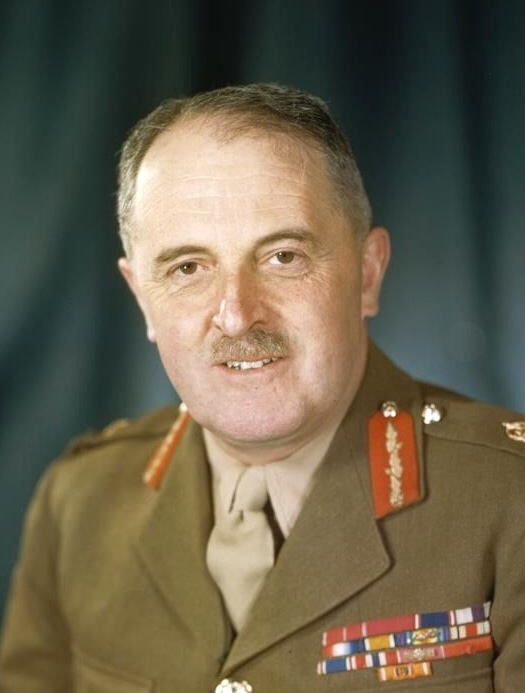
- Gale during the Second World War
- Born: 4 October 1890; London, England
- Died: 8 April 1971 (aged 80); La Tour-de-Peilz, Vaud, Switzerland
- Burial place: Corsier-Sur-Vevey Cemetery, Vaud, Switzerland
- Military career
- Allegiance: United Kingdom
- Branch: British Army
- Service years: 1908–1947
- Rank: Lieutenant-General
- Service number: 21273
- Units: Artists Rifles; Royal Army Service Corps
- Conflicts: First World War: Western Front; Second World War: Battle of France; Battle of Dunkirk; Operation Torch; Tunisian campaign; Allied invasion of Sicily; Allied invasion of Italy; Operation Overlord; Siegfried Line Campaign; Battle of the Bulge; Western Allied invasion of Germany
- Awards: Knight Commander of the Order of the British Empire; Companion of the Order of the Bath; Commander of the Royal Victorian Order; Military Cross; Mentioned in Despatches (2); Order of Wen-Hu, 5th Class (China); Army Distinguished Service Medal (United States); Legion of Merit (United States)
- Other work: European Director of UNRRA; Chairman of the Basildon, Essex New Town Development Corporation

Lieutenant-General Sir Humfrey Myddelton Gale, KBE, CB, CVO, MC (4 October 1890 – 8 April 1971) was an officer in the British Army who served in the First and Second World War, during which he was Chief Administrative Officer at Allied Forces Headquarters and later SHAEF under General Dwight D. Eisenhower. After the Second World War he was European Director of the United Nations Relief and Rehabilitation Administration, worked for the Anglo-Iranian Oil Company, and was chairman of the Basildon, Essex New Town Development Corporation

== Early life ==
Humfrey Myddelton Gale was born in London, England on 4 October 1890, the eldest of five children of Ernest Sewell Gale, an architect, and his wife Charlotte Sarah née Goddard. He was educated at St Paul's School, London and studied at the Architectural School, Westminster from 1908 to 1910. While there he served with the Artists Rifles of the Territorial Force. He decided to pursue a career in the British Indian Army and applied to the Royal Military College, Sandhurst. His application was successful and he entered the college in 1910. However, he did not graduate sufficiently high in his class to qualify for a posting to the Indian Army and was instead commissioned as a second lieutenant in the Army Service Corps (later the Royal Army Service Corps) of the British Army in September 1911. His early service was at Woolwich and Aldershot.

== First World War ==
During the First World War, Gale served on the Western Front, where he was awarded the Military Cross in 1915. He was promoted to lieutenant and then captain in 1914. In 1915, he became Deputy Assistant Director of Transport, British Expeditionary Force (BEF), and served in that post at General Headquarters for the remainder of the war. He was twice mentioned in despatches, and was awarded the Order of Wen-Hu (5th Class). He married Winifred Cross in 1917. Their marriage lasted until her death in 1936, and produced two daughters.

== Between the wars ==
With the war over due to the armistice with Germany on 11 November 1918, Gale served as a staff captain at the War Office in London from 1919 to 1923. Thereafter his military service during the interwar period alternated between regimental duty at home and in Egypt, and postings to the War Office. He was promoted to the brevet rank of major in 1921 but was not promoted substantially until 1930. He attended the Staff College, Camberley from 1924−1925. Among his many fellow students there were men such as Noel Irwin, Daril Watson, Ivor Thomas, Clifford Malden, Michael Creagh, Thomas Riddell-Webster, James Harter, Sydney Rigby Wason, Otto Marling Lund, Arthur Edward Barstow, Vyvyan Pope, Reade Godwin-Austen, Archibald Nye, George Lammie, Noel Beresford-Peirse, Geoffrey Raikes, Douglas Graham and Lionel Finch, along with Kenneth Stuart of the Canadian Army and John Northcott of the Australian Army. All of these men would, like Gale himself, become general officers in the future war.

After graduating from the Staff College, he then attended the Royal Naval College, Greenwich, before returning to the War Office in 1928, where he became Deputy Assistant Quartermaster General in 1930. After ten years as a major he was promoted to lieutenant colonel in 1932 and, in 1934, he returned to the Staff College, where he served as an instructor. He became Assistant Director of Shipping and Transport, War Office and was promoted to colonel in 1937 and then brigadier in 1939.

== Second World War ==
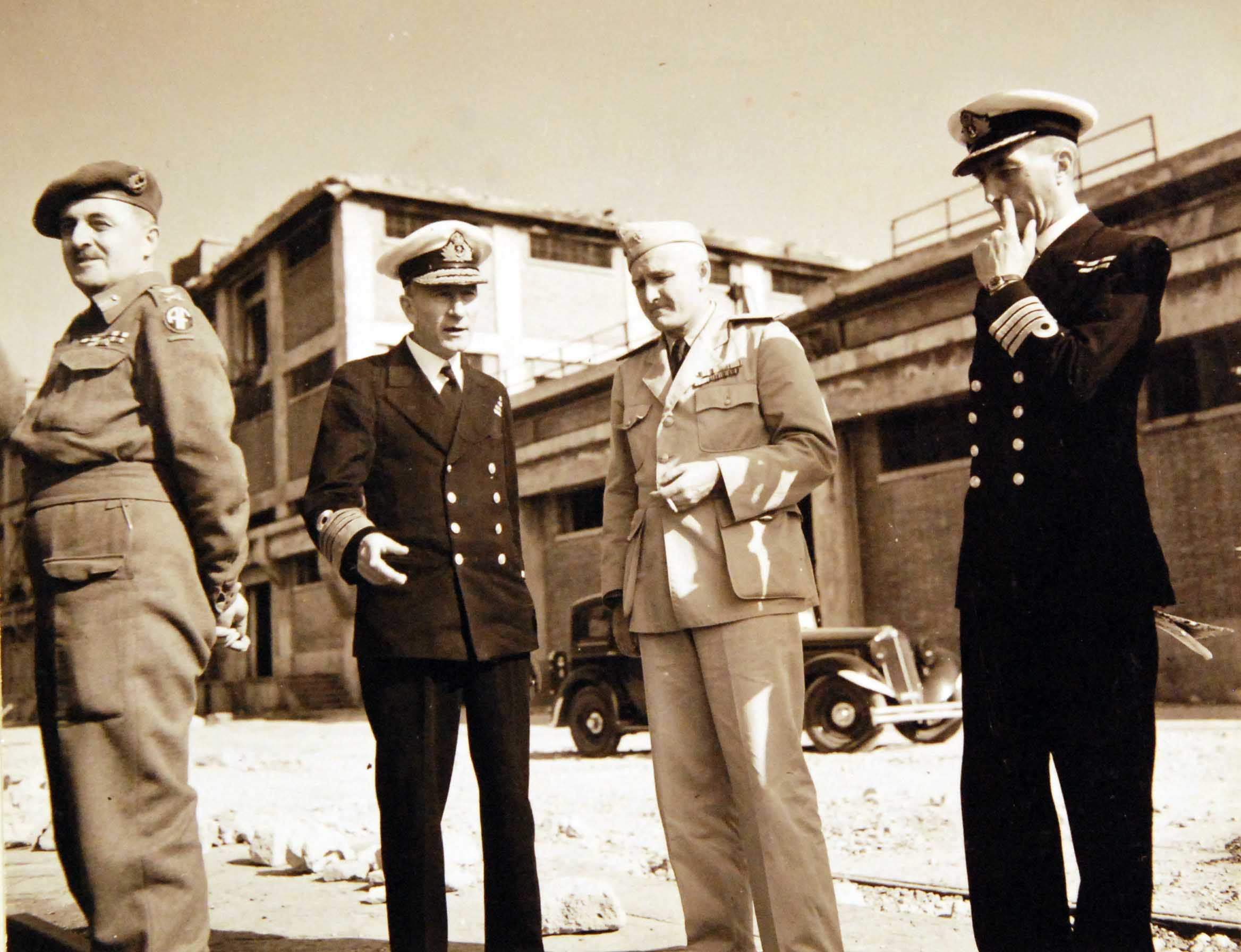
From left to right: Lieutenant General Sir Humfrey Gale, Admiral John Cunningham, RN, Commander W.A. Sullivan, USN, Captain W.A. Donst, RN in Naples, Italy, 9 November 1943.

Following the outbreak of the Second World War, in September 1939, Gale was appointed Deputy Adjutant and Quartermaster General of the III Corps, which was deployed to France with the new British Expeditionary Force (BEF) in 1940. He was responsible for administrative arrangements during the Battle of Dunkirk and managed to keep the supply system working. For his services in the campaign, he was appointed a Commander of the Order of the British Empire. Gale was promoted to major general in October 1940 and appointed Major General, Administration (MGA), Scottish Command. In 1941 he became Chief Administrative Officer (CAO) to General Sir Alan Brooke, then the Commander-in-Chief, Home Forces and, from December 1941 onwards, the Chief of the Imperial General Staff (CIGS). His work was recognised in June 1942 when he was appointed a Companion of the Order of the Bath.

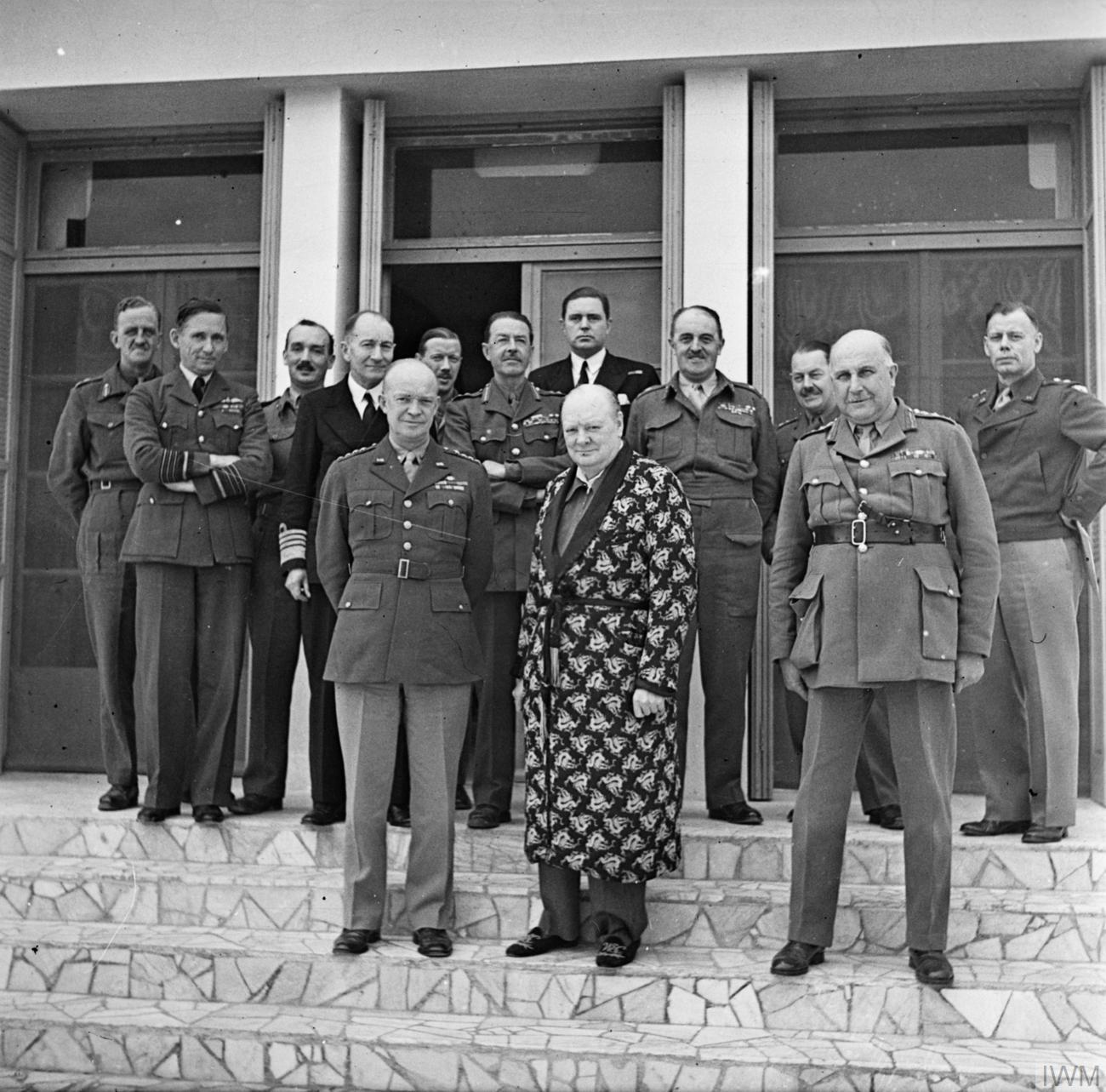
A convalescent Winston Churchill meets the outgoing and incoming Supreme Commanders in the Mediterranean, Dwight D. Eisenhower, to Churchill's right, and Henry Maitland Wilson, to his left. Behind them stand (from left to right), John Whiteley, Air Marshal Arthur Tedder, Brigadier G. S. Thompson, Admiral Sir John Cunningham, unknown, Sir Harold Alexander, Captain M. L. Power, Humfrey Gale, Leslie Hollis, and Eisenhower's chief of staff, Walter Bedell Smith.

On 15 September 1942 Gale was appointed its CAO of American Lieutenant General Dwight D. Eisenhower's Allied Forces Headquarters (AFHQ). While the general staff sections of AFHQ were integrated, the British and American administrative systems differed so greatly that separate organisations were established. Gale's job, which Eisenhower called "unique in the history of war", was to coordinate the two. For the Allied invasion of Sicily in July 1943, Gale was tasked with the planning and coordination of the sea convoys. Ships had to depart multiple ports in the United Kingdom and the Middle East on a predefined schedule, loaded with enormous quantities of supplies, equipment, stores and troops. For a time it was feared that demands of the Sicilian operation would be so great that other operations would have to be curtailed. For his contribution to the victory in the Tunisian campaign, he was created a Knight Commander of the Order of the British Empire in August 1943. He was also appointed a Commander of the Royal Victorian Order, and was awarded the United States Legion of Merit.

When Eisenhower left the Mediterranean to become the Supreme Allied Commander in Europe, Gale was one of a number of key officers that Eisenhower insisted on taking with him to his new headquarters, Supreme Headquarters Allied Expeditionary Force (SHAEF). When Brooke, the CIGS, demurred at this, Eisenhower's chief of staff, Lieutenant General Walter Bedell Smith, pointed out that Eisenhower had always felt "he would be unwilling to undertake another large Allied Command without Gale's administrative assistance ... He has that irreplaceable quality of being able to handle British-American supply problems with tact and judgement and he is almost as familiar with the American system of supply as with the British."

However, Gale found that while his title at SHAEF was the same, his role was different from that at AFHQ. In the Mediterranean he had had broad responsibility for logistics. In the European theatre, General Sir Bernard Montgomery's Anglo-Canadian 21st Army Group controlled its own supply while the American units had Headquarters, Communications Zone under Lieutenant General John C. H. Lee. At SHAEF, Gale had less real control over supply and administration than at AFHQ and his duties mostly involved coordinating the activities of the SHAEF staff sections and serving as chairman of various high-level committees that dealt with matters of supply. Gale was promoted to the temporary rank of lieutenant-general in August 1944, and in January 1945 he became Colonel Commandant of the Royal Army Service Corps, a position he held until 1954. He was also colonel commandant of the Army Catering Corps from 1946 to 1958. For his work at SHAEF, he was awarded the American Army Distinguished Service Medal.

== Post-war ==
Gale married again in 1945, this time to Minnie Grace, the daughter of Count Gregorini-Bigham of Bologna and the widow of Prince Charles Louis of Beauvau-Craon. From September 1945 to July 1947 he was the European Director of the United Nations Relief and Rehabilitation Administration. Gale retired from the British Army with the honorary rank of lieutenant general in October 1947, and took up a position with the Anglo-Iranian Oil Company. In 1954 Harold Macmillan persuaded Gale to become chairman of the Basildon, Essex New Town Development Corporation, a post Gale served in until 1964. Macmillan described Gale as one of the most efficient officers he had ever known. Gale and Minnie lived in La Tour de Peilz, Vaud, Switzerland, where he died on 8 April 1971, at the age of 80. His papers are in the Liddell Hart Centre for Military Archives.

== Bibliography ==
- Bjorge, Dr. Gary J. (1985). Large Units in North Africa and the Mediterranean. CSI Report, No. 6. Fort Leavenworth, Kansas: Combat Studies Institute. OCLC 70222717. Archived from the original on 16 November 2010.
- Playfair, Major-General I. S. O.; Molony, Brigadier C. J. C.; Flynn, Captain F. C.; Gleave, Group Captain T. P. (1966), Butler, J. R. M (ed.), The Mediterranean and Middle East, History of the Second World War, United Kingdom Military Series, vol. IV The Destruction of the Axis Forces in North Africa, London: Her Majesty's Stationery Office
- Playfair, Major-General I.S.O.; Molony, Brigadier C.J.C.; Flynn, Captain F.C.; Davies, Major General H. L.; Gleave, Group Captain T.P. (1973). Butler, J.R.M (ed.). The Mediterranean and Middle East. History of the Second World War, United Kingdom Military Series. Vol. V The Campaign in Sicily and the Campaign in Italy 3 September 1943 to 31 March 1944. London: Her Majesty's Stationery Office.
- Pogue, Forrest C. (1954). The Supreme Command. Washington, D.C.: United States Army Center of Military History. OCLC 1247005.
- Smart, Nick (2005). Biographical Dictionary of British Generals of the Second World War. Barnesley: Pen & Sword. ISBN 1844150496.
- Strawson, John (2004). "Gale, Sir Humfrey Myddelton (1890–1971)". Oxford Dictionary of National Biography (online ed.). Oxford University Press. doi:10.1093/ref:odnb/31133. (Subscription, Wikipedia Library access or UK public library membership required.)
