= John Reeve (British Army officer) =

British army general

Major-General John Reeve CB CBE DSO
- Born: 19 April 1891; Lincolnshire, England
- Died: 25 June 1983 (aged 92); Bury St Edmonds, Suffolk, England
- Military career
- Allegiance: United Kingdom
- Branch: British Army
- Service years: 1911–1946
- Rank: Major-General
- Service number: 14839
- Units: Rifle Brigade (The Prince Consort's Own); Royal Artillery
- Commands: Sussex District (1943–44); Hong Kong Infantry Brigade (1938–41); 1st Battalion, Rifle Brigade (The Prince Consort's Own) (1936–38)
- Conflicts: First World War; Second World War
- Awards: Companion of the Order of the Bath; Commander of the Order of the British Empire; Distinguished Service Order; Mentioned in Despatches

Major-General John Talbot Wentworth Reeve, CB, CBE, DSO (19 April 1891 − 25 June 1983) was a British Army who served in both world wars.

== Military career ==
Born in Lincolnshire and educated at Eton College, Reeve attended and later graduated from the Royal Military College, Sandhurst, from where he was commissioned into the Rifle Brigade (The Prince Consort's Own) in October 1910. He served throughout the First World War, mainly on the Western Front in France and Belgium and, after being promoted to captain in 1915, he ended the war having been mentioned in despatches and was awarded the Distinguished Service Order in 1919, the same year in which he married.

The interwar period saw Reeve remain in the army and transferred to the Royal Artillery, which was followed by attendance and subsequent graduation from the Staff College, Camberley, from 1924 to 1925, where Noel Irwin, Douglas Graham, Vyvyan Pope and Thomas Riddell-Webster were among his many fellow students that year who ultimately became general officers. Following this, he served from 1926 to 1930 as a staff officer at the War Office in London before transferring from the Royal Artillery back to the Rifle Brigade, where he commanded the regiment's 1st Battalion from 1936 to 1938. 1938 saw him promoted to the temporary rank of brigadier and placed in command of the Hong Kong Infantry Brigade in Hong Kong. He held this position until late 1941, two years after the outbreak of the Second World War.

Returning to the United Kingdom, Reeve became Deputy Adjutant General with Home Forces from 1942 to 1943, the same year in which, on 15 May, he was promoted to the acting rank of major-general. He then became commander of Sussex District until 1944 when he was made Deputy Adjutant General with Middle East Command, then commanded by General Sir Bernard Paget. He held this post until 1946 when, after more than thirty-five years of military service, he retired from the army and was appointed a Companion of the Order of the Bath.

== Personal life ==
His only son having been killed in action in the North African campaign in 1942, his wife died soon after Reeve's retirement, in 1949. He married again the following year and retired to Bury St Edmonds in Suffolk, where he spent the rest of his life until his death on 25 June 1983, at the age of 92.

== Bibliography ==
- Smart, Nick (2005). Biographical Dictionary of British Generals of the Second World War. Barnesley: Pen & Sword. ISBN 1844150496.
