= Vyvyan Pope =

British Army general

Lieutenant-General Vyvyan Pope CBE DSO MC*
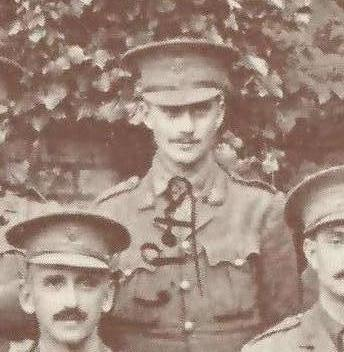
- Second Lieutenant Pope in Cambridge in August 1914, shortly before embarking for France as the junior subaltern of the 1st Battalion, North Staffordshire Regiment
- Born: 30 September 1891; London, England
- Died: 5 October 1941 (aged 50)
- Burial place: Cairo War Memorial Cemetery, Cairo, Egypt
- Military career
- Allegiance: United Kingdom
- Branch: British Army
- Service years: 1911–1941
- Rank: Lieutenant-General
- Service number: 5475
- Units: North Staffordshire Regiment; Royal Tank Regiment
- Commands: XXX Corps; 3rd Armoured Brigade; 1st Battalion, North Staffordshire Regiment
- Conflicts: First World War; Russian Civil War; Anglo-Irish War; Second World War
- Awards: Commander of the Order of the British Empire; Distinguished Service Order; Military Cross & Bar; Mentioned in Despatches

Lieutenant-General Vyvyan Vavasour Pope, CBE, DSO, MC & Bar (30 September 1891 – 5 October 1941) was a senior British Army officer who was prominent in developing ideas about the use of armour in battle in the interwar years, and who briefly commanded XXX Corps during the Second World War before dying in an air crash.

== Early life and education ==
Vyvyan Pope was born on 30 September 1891 in London, the son of James Pope, a civil servant, and his wife Blanche Holmwood (née Langdale) Pope. He was educated at Ascham St Vincent's School, an all-boys preparatory school in Eastbourne, Sussex, and then at Lancing College, an all-boys boarding private school in Lancing, Sussex. He was at Lancing from September 1906 to December 1910 and was a member of the school's football team and its Officer Training Corps (where he reached the rank of sergeant). He was a member of Seconds House and he served as house captain in 1910.

== Early military career ==
On 8 March 1911, Pope was commissioned as a second lieutenant (on probation) in the 4th Battalion, Prince of Wales's (North Staffordshire Regiment), as part of the Special Reserve of the British Army. The Special Reserve were volunteer reservists (i.e. part-time soldiers) who had not previously served in the military. His commission and rank were confirmed on 24 October 1911. In October 1912, he sat and passed the Competitive Examination of Officers of the Special Reserve, Militia, and Territorial Forces.

Pope was now eligible to transfer from the reserves to the regular army and made the move on 4 December 1912. He became the junior subaltern of the 1st Battalion, North Staffordshire Regiment, then serving as part of the 17th Brigade of the 6th Division. During this period, he saw service in Ireland.

== First World War ==
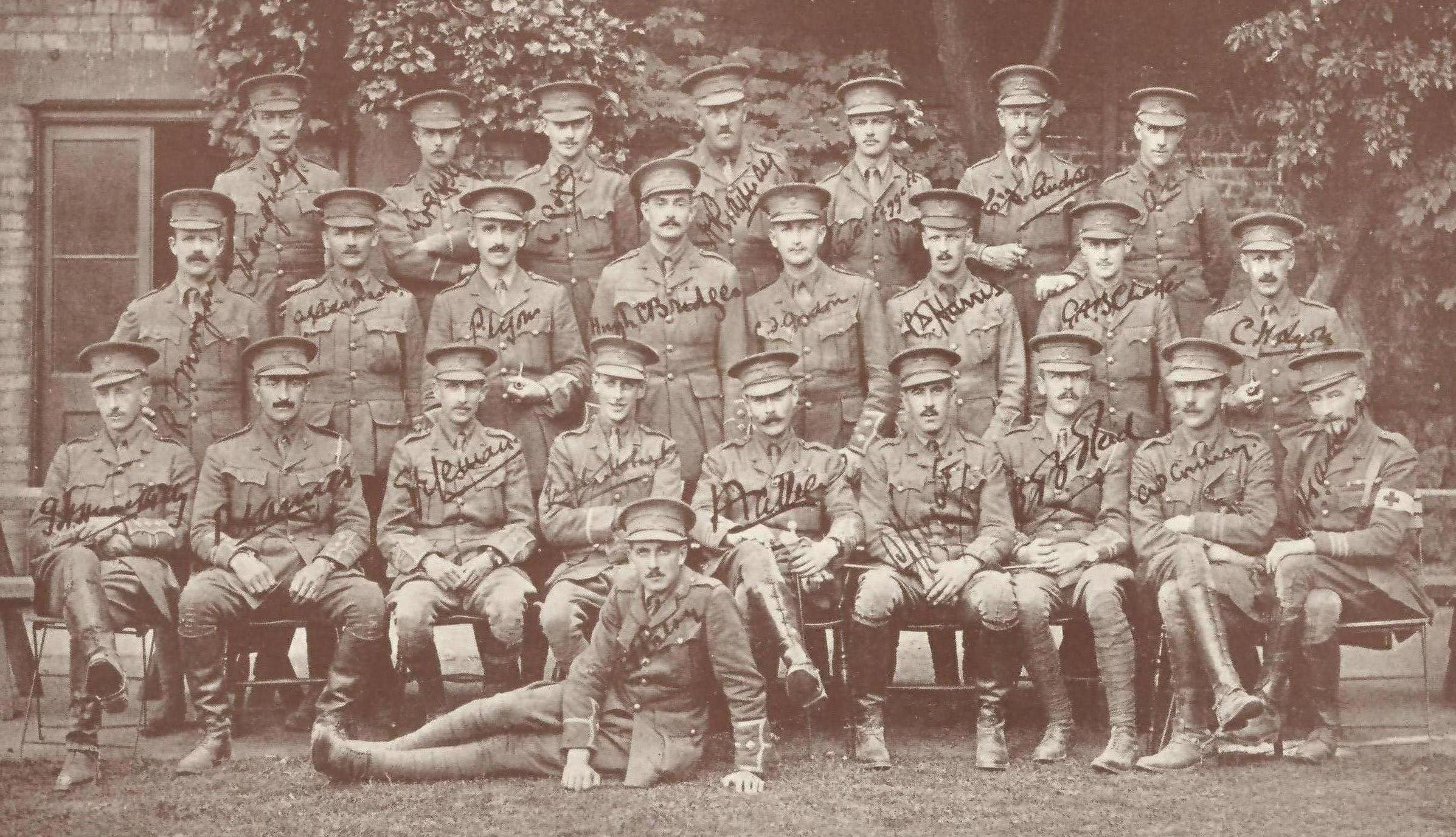
Officers of the 1st Battalion, North Staffordshire Regiment, photographed in Cambridge, August 1914. Lieutenant Vyvyan Pope is pictured standing in the back row, third from the left.

Following the outbreak of the First World War in August 1914, the battalion was transferred to England, and embarked for the Western Front the following month. Pope remained with the battalion for most of the war, seeing action in the First Battle of Ypres in late 1914, in the Battle of Neuve Chapelle (where he won the Military Cross) in 1915, in the two serious gas attacks at Wulverghem in April and June 1916 (in the first of which his actions won him the DSO), in the Battle of the Somme in mid-1916 and in the Battle of Messines in mid-1917. His MC citation states the following:

For the gallantry, skill, and dash with which he led his Company in the attack on the German position at Lepinnette, on the night of the 11th–12th instant.

The citation for his DSO reads

For conspicuous gallantry and devotion to duty. When a party of the enemy broke into our trench, he at once organised a counter-attack, drove them out, and, although himself wounded in two places, remained at the point of danger till all was quiet. He then had his wounds dressed, but refused to leave his duties.

He also participated in the Christmas truce of 1914. In June 1917, having returned from being wounded for the second time at Messines, and now a captain with the acting rank of lieutenant-colonel, he took over command of 1/North Staffs just in time to see the battalion, now serving as part of the 72nd Brigade of the 24th Division, take a prominent role in the Battle of Passchendaele (also known as the Third Battle of Ypres).

Second Lieutenant Bernard Martin of D Company, 1st Battalion, North Staffs would later write that, some days before the 31 July 1917 attack on Jehovah and Jordan Trenches near Zandvoorde, Pope had ordered, to the surprise of his officers, that the attacking lines were "not to charge at the double across No-Man's-Land as in the old tactics but to walk at a steady pace towards Jehovah". Under orders from High Command, the battalion was able to "charge" only after taking Jordan Trench. Starting the day with an estimated 550 rifles, the battalion lost 50 per cent of their attacking force: 4 officers killed and 7 wounded, 38 other ranks killed and 210 wounded, and 10 missing presumed killed.

On 21 March 1918, the battalion was in front-line trenches near Saint-Quentin when the Germans began Operation Michael, the opening attack in their Spring Offensive. There were extensive casualties, and, in a highly confused and fluid situation, Pope received a bullet wound in the right elbow. (Note: Pope's detailed account of his experiences on this day is published in Martin Middlebrook's The Kaiser's Battle.) By the time he reached a hospital gas gangrene had set in, and his right arm had to be amputated. Every year thereafter he drank a glass of port on 21 March in memory of his fallen comrades. Following his discharge from hospital Pope attempted to find a route back into military service, but before he could do so the Armistice with Germany had been signed.

== Between the wars ==
Pope managed to secure a position in 1919 in the North Russia Relief Force, part of the Allied intervention on the side of the White forces in the Russian Civil War. Having reached Arkhangelsk, he took command of a Slavo-British unit largely made up of prisoners freed from Arkhangelsk prison, but the exercise was not a success.

On his return to Britain, and following a brief period of service with the 2nd Battalion, North Staffordshire Regiment in Ireland, he transferred in April 1920 to the Royal Tank Corps (RTC). He promptly returned to Ireland with an armoured car company and saw action in the Irish War of Independence. In 1922 he took command for a short period of the 3rd Armoured Car Company in Egypt but then again returned to Britain.

He attended the Staff College, Camberley, from 1924 to 1925, and served alongside numerous future general officers, most notably Humfrey Gale, Archibald Nye, Ivor Thomas, Willoughby Norrie, Thomas Riddell-Webster, Reade Godwin-Austen, Noel Irwin, Noel Beresford-Peirse, Michael Creagh, Geoffrey Raikes, Thomas Riddell-Webster, Daril Watson and Douglas Graham. In 1926 he was appointed brigade major to the Royal Tank Corps Centre, Bovington, where he was at the centre of emerging ideas about the use of armour in battle. He held a post as a General Staff Officer (GSO) at Southern Command from 1928 to 1930 and at the War Office from 1930 to 1933. and attended the Imperial Defence College in 1934. In 1935, at the time of the Italo-Abyssinian War, he was posted by Brigadier Percy Hobart to Egypt, as Commander of the Royal Tank Corps there, with a brief to promote the advantages of mechanised forces: the episode taught him valuable lessons about the challenges of operating vehicles in a desert. In June 1936 he was posted to the Directorate of Military Training at the War Office under a former Staff College instructor, Alan Brooke; and in 1938 to the General Staff of Southern Command.

== Second World War ==
Formation sign of II Corps, designed by Pope

On the outbreak of the Second World War in September 1939, Pope was appointed Chief of Staff to II Corps, which had been mobilised at Salisbury under Brooke's command. Pope designed II Corps' badge of a salmon leaping over a stylised "brook", as a play on his commander's name. At the end of September 1939 the corps crossed to France to join the British Expeditionary Force (BEF). Pope went with them but returned to England in December to take command of the 3rd Armoured Brigade, part of the 1st Armoured Division (Major-General Roger Evans).

In April 1940, he was appointed Inspector of the Royal Armoured Corps (RAC). He was then posted as Adviser on Armoured Fighting Vehicles (AFV) on General Lord Gort's staff at BEF headquarters in France. He soon contrived to become more closely involved in the fighting, and was a prominent commander in the Allied counter-attack at Arras on 21 May, which, although it did not halt the advancing Germans, shook their confidence.

The BEF was forced to retreat, and at the end of May Pope was evacuated from Dunkirk. He returned to the War Office, where he was appointed Director of Armoured Fighting Vehicles in June 1940. While in this post he played a key role in initiating production of the A22 tank (afterwards known as the Churchill tank).

The Western Desert campaign now assumed a growing importance in strategic thinking, and by the summer of 1941 an offensive in the desert against the Axis named Operation Crusader was being planned. It was to be fought by the new Eighth Army (Lieutenant-General Sir Alan Cunningham), comprising XIII Corps, an infantry corps and XXX Corps, a predominantly armoured corps. In August 1941 Pope was appointed General Officer Commanding (GOC) XXX Corps. He flew to Egypt in September and assembled a staff; but on 5 October, en route to Cunningham's first conference on the forthcoming battle, his Hudson aircraft ran into trouble on taking off from Heliopolis, and crashed in the Mocattam Hills. All on board, including Pope and his Brigadier General Staff, Hugh Edward Russell, were killed. Pope was succeeded as GOC XXX Corps by Lieutenant-General Willoughby Norrie, who had been one of his fellow students at the Staff College, Camberley in the mid-1920s. Although a good soldier, Norrie, a cavalryman, lacked Pope's high ability and intellect.

== Personal life ==
Pope married Sybil Moore in 1926.

== Bibliography ==
- History of the 1st & 2nd Battalions The North Staffordshire Regiment (The Prince of Wales'), 1914–1923. Longton: Royal Press. 1932. OCLC 79656991.
- Lewin, Ronald (1976). Man of Armour: A Study of Lieut-General Vyvyan Pope and the Development of Armoured Warfare. London: Leo Cooper. ISBN 0-85052-050-9.
- Mead, Richard (2007). Churchill's Lions: A Biographical Guide to the key British Generals of World War II. Stroud: Spellmount. ISBN 978-1-86227-431-0.
- Middlebrook, Martin (1983) [1978]. The Kaiser's Battle: 21 March 1918: the first day of the German Spring Offensive (Penguin ed.). London: Allen Lane. ISBN 0-14139-026-3.
- Smart, Nick (2005). Biographical Dictionary of British Generals of the Second World War. Barnesley: Pen & Sword. ISBN 978-1-84415-049-6.
- Tanner, Jim (2017). "The First Day of Third Ypres: the 1st Battalion the Prince of Wales's (North Staffordshire) Regiment". Stand To! The Journal of the Western Front Association. 109: 45–51. ISSN 0261-6548.

Military offices
New command	GOC XXX Corps; August–October 1941	Succeeded by Willoughby Norrie
