= Lammie =

Lammie is an Irish and Scottish name.

== Persons with this name include ==
- "Andrew Lammie", subject of traditional Scottish song of the same name
- Bobby Lammie (born 1997), Scottish curler
- George Lammie (1891–1946), British army officer
- Lammie Robertson (1947–2023), Scottish footballer
