= Reade Godwin-Austen =

British Army general (1889–1963)

General Sir Reade Godwin-Austen KCSI CB OBE MC
- General Sir Reade Godwin-Austen in 1946
- Born: 17 April 1889; Frensham, Farnham, Surrey, England
- Died: 20 March 1963 (aged 73); Maidenhead, Berkshire, England
- Relatives: Sir Henry Godwin (great-grandfather); Henry Haversham Godwin-Austen (uncle)
- Military career
- Allegiance: United Kingdom
- Branch: British Army
- Service years: 1909–1947
- Rank: General
- Service number: 6446
- Commands: XIII Corps (1941–1942); 12th (African) Division (1940–1941); 2nd (African) Division (1940); 8th Infantry Division (1939–1940); 14th Infantry Brigade (1938–1939); 13th Infantry Brigade (1938); 2nd Battalion, Duke of Cornwall's Light Infantry (1936–1937)
- Conflicts: First World War; Arab revolt in Palestine; Second World War
- Awards: Knight Commander of the Order of the Star of India; Companion of the Order of the Bath; Officer of the Order of the British Empire; Military Cross; Mentioned in Despatches (6)
- Other work: Colonel of the South Wales Borderers (1950–1954)

General Sir Alfred Reade Godwin-Austen, KCSI, CB, OBE, MC (17 April 1889 – 20 March 1963) was a British Army officer who served during the First and the Second World Wars.

== Early life and military career ==
The second son of Lieutenant Colonel A. G. Godwin-Austen, late the 24th and 89th (The Princess Victoria's) Regiment of Foot, Reade Godwin-Austen was born in Frensham, Farnham in Surrey, on 17 April 1889. He was educated at St Lawrence College, Ramsgate, and later at the Royal Military College, Sandhurst, to pursue a military career, following both his father and great-grandfather.

Godwin-Austen was a great-grandson of Major General Sir Henry Godwin, who commanded the British and Indian forces in the Second Anglo-Burmese War. His uncle was Henry Haversham Godwin-Austen, who gave his name to the highest mountain in the Karakoram range; this mountain is now better known as K2.

Upon passing out from Sandhurst, Godwin-Austen was commissioned as a second lieutenant into the South Wales Borderers in 1909.

During his service in the First World War, he was awarded the Military Cross and twice mentioned in despatches while serving as a staff officer with the 13th (Western) Division, a Kitchener's Army formation, at Gallipoli, in Palestine, and in Mesopotamia. In November 1915 he succeeded Douglas Brownrigg as the 13th Division's deputy assistant adjutant and quartermaster general.

== Between the wars ==
Godwin-Austen attended the Staff College, Camberley, as a student from 1924 to 1925, alongside fellow students such as Ivor Thomas, Noel Beresford-Peirse, Vyvyan Pope, Douglas Graham, Michael O'Moore Creagh, Daril Watson, Archibald Nye, Humfrey Gale and Noel Irwin, all of whom rose to high command in the next war. He served in numerous staff positions at the War Office until receiving a position as an instructor at the Royal Military College, Sandhurst.

In February 1930 he was made a major and brevet lieutenant colonel. Due to a lack of promotion in his own regiment, Godwin-Austen transferred as a lieutenant colonel to the Duke of Cornwall's Light Infantry and commanded the 2nd Battalion from 1936 to 1937, before being employed with the British military mission to the Egyptian Army from 1937 to 1938. His next appointment, during the Arab revolt in Palestine, was in successive command of the 13th and 14th Infantry Brigades, the latter post being held until August 1939, shortly before the Second World War began. While in Palestine, Godwin-Austen gained a reputation for being very sympathetic towards and supportive of the Zionist movement. In the conflict between Jewish and Arab residents, he believed the Arabs were "clearly the aggressors" and the Jewish residents of the territory needed to be protected. Godwin-Austen advocated that the British army provide said protection.

== Second World War ==
On the outbreak of war in September 1939, Godwin-Austen, mentioned in despatches for his services in Palestine, had just been promoted to the acting rank of major general to become General Officer Commanding (GOC) of the 8th Infantry Division. Bernard Montgomery had relinquished command and returned to England to command the 3rd Infantry Division. The understrength division was responsible for internal security in the British Mandate of Palestine. After the division was disbanded in February 1940, Godwin-Austen was nominated in July to command the 2nd (African) Division, which was forming in Kenya. He was again mentioned in despatches in July 1940.

In mid-August, before taking up his command, Godwin-Austen was sent to British Somaliland to take over the British forces during the Italian conquest of British Somaliland. His withdrawal at the decisive Battle of Tug Argan was fatal to his attempt to defend the territory but it allowed almost the entire Commonwealth contingent to withdraw to Berbera and evacuate by sea to Aden. Commonwealth losses in the short campaign are estimated to have been exceedingly light, about 260 (38 killed, 102 wounded and 120 missing).

Prime Minister Winston Churchill, stung by the loss to British prestige, criticised General Sir Archibald Wavell, Commander-in-Chief of Middle East Command, concerning the loss of British Somaliland, which was a Middle East Command responsibility. Because of the few casualties, Churchill fretted that the British had abandoned the colony without enough of a fight. He demanded the suspension of Godwin-Austen and the convening of a court of inquiry.

Wavell claimed that the defence of Somaliland was a textbook withdrawal in the face of superior numbers. He pointed out to Churchill that "A bloody butcher's bill is not the sign of a good tactician". According to Churchill's staff, Wavell's retort moved Churchill to greater fury than they had ever seen. Wavell refused to accede to Churchill's demand and Godwin-Austen moved on to take command of his division in Kenya on 12 September. Churchill was to retain his grudge towards him.

During the East African campaign, Godwin-Austen led the 2nd (African) Division (renamed 12th (African) Division) as part of East Africa Force, commanded by Lieutenant General Alan Cunningham, in its advance from Kenya into Italian East Africa. His division invaded Italian Somaliland on 11 February and by late February had scored an emphatic victory over Italian forces at Gelib. Once Mogadishu had been taken, Cunningham swung his force inland across the Ogaden desert and into Ethiopia, entering the capital, Addis Ababa, on 6 April.

At the end of the campaign, Godwin-Austen was promoted to his last fighting command, leading the Western Desert Force (which became XIII Corps) in the Western Desert campaign in North Africa. During Operation Crusader, he was vociferous in his opposition to the suggestion of Alan Cunningham, by now commanding Eighth Army, and so once more his direct superior, that they should abandon the offensive after the setback of Rommel's "dash to the wire". The Commander-in-Chief Middle East, now General Claude Auchinleck, chose to continue the offensive; Crusader went on to relieve the Siege of Tobruk and push the Axis forces back to El Agheila and Cunningham was relieved of his command.

When Rommel counter-attacked in January 1942, the Allies were forced to retreat in some confusion. Godwin-Austen, seeing that one of his divisions, the 4th Indian Infantry Division, was under threat, after consulting with Cunningham's successor, Lieutenant General Neil Ritchie, ordered them to withdraw. Ritchie changed his mind and issued a countermand directly to Major General Francis Tuker, the divisional commander. Feeling that Ritchie had by this action displayed a lack of confidence in him, Godwin-Austen tendered his resignation to Auchinleck, which was reluctantly accepted. Tuker was later to write: "His going was the latest of many misjudgements which had started to shake confidence in the leadership. We lost the wrong man."

In spite of support from General Sir Alan Brooke, Chief of the Imperial General Staff, and Sir James Grigg, the Secretary of State for War, Churchill was adamant that Godwin-Austen should not receive a new posting. (Note: Alanbrooke in his diary entry of 11 May 1942 wrote: "... Grigg and I tackled PM again about Cunningham and Godwin-Austen, but without any luck! ... the moment their names are mentioned one might imagine they are criminals of the worst order". A further attempt and refusal is mentioned in the entry of 18 May.) Churchill relented in November after the intervention of South African Field Marshal Jan Smuts and Godwin-Austen was appointed Director of Tactical Investigation at the War Office. He subsequently became Vice Quartermaster-General at the War Office and as the war ended, the Quartermaster-General and then Principal Administrative Officer in India, reporting to the Commander-in-Chief, General Sir Claude Auchinleck.

== Postwar ==
Godwin-Austen was knighted in 1946 and retired from the army on 5 March 1947, after having achieved the rank of general. Serving as Chairman of the South-West Division of the National Coal Board, from 1946 to 1947, he was also Colonel of the South Wales Borderers from 1950 to 1954. Godwin-Austen, a bachelor, after suffering from a long illness, died in Maidenhead on 20 March 1963, just under a month from his 74th birthday.

== Bibliography ==
- Alanbrooke, Field Marshal Lord (2001). Danchev, Alex; Todman, Daniel (eds.). War Diaries 1939–1945. Phoenix. ISBN 978-1-84212-526-7.
- Mackenzie, Compton (1951). Eastern Epic: September 1939 – March 1943: Defence. Vol. I. London: Chatto & Windus. OCLC 1412578.
- Mead, Richard (2007). Churchill's Lions: A Biographical Guide to the Key British Generals of World War II. Stroud: Spellmount. ISBN 978-1-86227-431-0.
- Smart, Nick (2005). Biographical Dictionary of British Generals of the Second World War. Barnesley: Pen & Sword. ISBN 978-1-84415-049-6.

Military offices
Preceded by Bernard Montgomery	GOC 8th Infantry Division; 1939–1940	Post disbanded
New command	GOC 12th (African) Division; 1940–1941	Succeeded by Charles Fowkes
Preceded by Noel Beresford-Peirse	GOC XIII Corps; 1941–1942	Succeeded by William Gott
Honorary titles
Preceded by Dudley Johnson	Colonel of the South Wales Borderers; 1950–1954	Succeeded by Francis Matthews
