= Noel Irwin =

British Army general (1892–1972)

Lieutenant-General Noel Irwin CB DSO & Two Bars MC
- Born: 24 December 1892; Motihari, British India
- Died: 21 December 1972 (aged 79); Holford, Somerset, England
- Military career
- Allegiance: United Kingdom
- Branch: British Army
- Service years: 1911–1948
- Rank: Lieutenant-General
- Service number: 4987
- Units: Essex Regiment; Border Regiment
- Commands: West Africa Command (1946–1948); East Scotland District (1944–1945); Eastern Army, India (1942–1943); IV Corps (1942); XI Corps (1941–1942); 38th (Welsh) Infantry Division (1940–1941); 2nd Infantry Division (1940); 6th Infantry Brigade (1939–1940); 1st Battalion, Lincolnshire Regiment (1918–1919); 8th Battalion, Leicestershire Regiment (1918); 2nd Battalion, Lincolnshire Regiment (1917–1918)
- Conflicts: First World War; Second World War
- Awards: Companion of the Order of the Bath; Distinguished Service Order & Two Bars; Military Cross; Mentioned in Despatches (4); Croix de guerre (France)

Lieutenant-General Noel Mackintosh Stuart Irwin, CB, DSO & Two Bars, MC (24 December 1892 – 21 December 1972) was a senior British Army officer, who played a prominent role in the British Army after the Dunkirk evacuation and in the Burma campaign during the Second World War. He was also instrumental in some reforms to the training and equipment of British soldiers after the defeat in France in 1940, intended to meet the demands of modern warfare.

== Early life and First World War ==
Noel Irwin was the eldest son of William Stuart Irwin of Motihari, Bihar and Orissa, India. He was educated at Marlborough College, before entry into the Royal Military College, Sandhurst. He was married twice; first in 1918 to Margaret Maud Bavin who died in 1963, and in 1966 to Mrs Elizabeth Collier (née Fröhlich). He had one son by his first wife.

Irwin graduated from Sandhurst in 1912 and was appointed as a second lieutenant in the Essex Regiment. During the First World War, Irwin saw action on the Western Front, initially serving with his battalion, then part of the 12th Brigade of the 4th Division, in most of the major battles of 1914 and 1915, before serving in the final two years as the commanding officer of the 1st and 2nd Battalions of the Lincolnshire Regiment and the 8th Battalion of the Leicestershire Regiment. Still a second lieutenant upon war's outbreak, Irwin advanced quickly in rank, being promoted to lieutenant on 24 September 1914, temporary captain on 9 May 1915, captain on 7 November 1915, acting major on 10 March 1917, and acting lieutenant colonel on 27 April 1917, before reverting to acting major on 1 June 1917. He was again made an acting lieutenant colonel on 23 August 1917. He was promoted to temporary lieutenant colonel on 6 April 1918, and again temporary lieutenant colonel on 1 July 1918.

Irwin was awarded the Military Cross on 3 July 1915, the Distinguished Service Order (DSO) on 1 January 1918 with two bars, awarded respectively on 24 September 1918 and 11 January 1919, and was four times mentioned in despatches, on 1 January 1916, on 22 May 1917, 21 December 1917, and 28 December 1918, in addition to the French Croix de guerre in November 1918.

== Between the wars ==
Following the end of the war, Irwin was promoted to the brevet rank of major on 3 June 1919. He later attended the Staff College, Camberley as a student from 1924 to 1925, his fellow students including Reade Godwin-Austen, Ivor Thomas, Douglas Graham, Noel Beresford-Peirse, Humfrey Gale, Archibald Nye and Willoughby Norrie, Daril Watson, Vyvyan Pope, Thomas Riddell-Webster and Otto Lund. Following this, he served on the staff of the British Army of the Rhine. Between 1920 and 1932, he served in regimental and depot duties and transferred to the Border Regiment in 1927. In 1933, he was appointed as Chief Instructor at the Royal Military College, Sandhurst serving for three years. In 1937, he served briefly as General Staff Officer, Grade 1 (GSO1) for British troops stationed in China.

== Second World War ==
At the start of the Second World War in September 1939, Irwin, promoted to temporary brigadier on 15 March 1939, headed the 6th Infantry Brigade, part of the 2nd Division. On 20 May 1940, he was promoted to acting major-general and took command of the division during the retreat to Dunkirk in the Battle of France.

Following the Dunkirk evacuation in May 1940, Irwin was made a Companion of the Order of the Bath on 11 July 1940. From 28 October he commanded the 38th (Welsh) Infantry Division in Britain. His rank of major-general was made permanent on 29 March 1941 (with seniority backdated to 22 November 1940). On 7 November 1941 Irwin, promoted to the acting rank of lieutenant-general, commanded the XI Corps, which was based in East Anglia and had substantial responsibilities for the defence of Britain in the event of a German invasion.

He was transferred to the Middle East in 1942, to command of the IV Corps in Iraq. The Corps HQ was subsequently transferred to India after the Japanese conquest of Burma. Irwin became General Officer Commanding-in-Chief Eastern Army, India in July 1942. Eastern Army had wide responsibilities for defending eastern frontier of India against the Japanese, and maintaining security in large areas of India. His rank of lieutenant-general was made temporary on 23 November 1942.

For the minor attack in Arakan late in 1942, Irwin and Eastern Army HQ bypassed XV Corps HQ after disagreements with the local commander, Bill Slim, and took command of the operation. The attack failed, with severe effects on Allied morale and prestige. On 6 April 1943, Irwin gave a press conference in which he criticised the equipment, training and motivation of the Allied armies in India.

In 1944, he was appointed the General Officer Commanding East Scotland District in his substantive rank of major general (a significant step-down from his previous three jobs), and remained in this post until the end of the war. After three years as Commander-in-Chief of British forces of the West Africa Command, during which time he was promoted to the permanent rank of lieutenant general, he retired to private life in 1948.

In the 1952 Kenyan general election, Agnes Shaw defeated Noel Irwin by 632 votes to 317.

== Honours and awards ==
During his military career, Irwin was made a Companion of the Order of the Bath, was awarded the Military Cross and the Distinguished Service Order with two Bars. He was Mentioned in Despatches four times but significantly, he never received a knighthood, which would normally be expected for an officer of substantive lieutenant general rank.

- Companion of the Order of the Bath (11 July 1940)
- Distinguished Service Order (1 January 1918, 24 September 1918 For conspicuous gallantry and devotion to duty. When the whole of his battalion front was heavily attacked and all communications with his forward companies were cut, this officer personally organised his headquarters and stragglers, and formed a defensive flank so as to obtain touch with the brigade on the right. This flank he held for eight hours against all attacks, organising two counter-attacks against the enemy during this period, thus averting a critical situation. It was greatly due to his able conduct that the holding of their battle position by his brigade was possible throughout the day. His courage, energy and quick decision inspired the greatest confidence in his men, 1919)
- Military Cross (3 July 1915: On 2 May 1915, east of Ypres, when in reserve trenches with his company, seeing that the men in the front trenches were overcome by gas and were retiring, with great initiative and courage and under heavy fire, he at once advanced with his company and seized the front trenches before the Germans could occupy them, and drove back the enemy's attack. On 13 May in the counter-attack he handled his company with great skill and determination.)
- Mention in Despatches (1 January 1916, 22 May 1917, 21 December 1917, and 28 December 1918)
- Croix de guerre (France)

== Bibliography ==
- Latimer, Jon, Burma: The Forgotten War, London: John Murray, 2004. ISBN 978-0-7195-6576-2
- Liddell Hart, Basil, and Constance Kritzberg, Henry, A History of the Second World War. New York: Putnam, 1971. ISBN 0-306-80912-5
- Malkasian, Carter. A History of Modern Wars of Attrition. Westport, Connecticut: Greenwood Press, 2002. ISBN 0-275-97379-4
- Mead, Richard (2007). Churchill's Lions: a biographical guide to the key British generals of World War II. Stroud, Gloucestershire: Spellmount. ISBN 978-1-86227-431-0.
- Smart, Nick (2005). Biographical Dictionary of British Generals of the Second World War. Barnsley, South Yorkshire: Pen and Sword Books. ISBN 1844150496.

Military offices
Preceded by Charles Loyd	GOC 2nd Infantry Division; May–August 1940	Succeeded by Daril Watson
Preceded by Aubrey Williams	GOC 38th (Welsh) Infantry Division; 1940–1941	Succeeded by Arthur Dowler
Preceded by Hugh Massy	GOC XI Corps; 1941–1942	Succeeded by John Crocker
Preceded by Thomas Corbett	GOC IV Corps; April–July 1942	Succeeded by Geoffry Scoones
Preceded by Sir Charles Broad	GOC-in-C Eastern Army, India; 1942–1943	Succeeded by Sir George Giffard
Preceded by Brocas Burrows	GOC West Africa Command; 1946–1948	Succeeded by Sir Cameron Nicholson
