= Henry May (VC) =

Scottish soldier (1885–1941), recipient of the Victoria Cross

- Image from picture postcard of Henry May.
- Born: 29 July 1885; Bridgeton, Glasgow, Scotland
- Died: 26 July 1941 (aged 55); Glasgow, Scotland
- Burial place: Riddrie Park Cemetery
- Military career
- Allegiance: United Kingdom
- Branch: British Army
- Service years: 1902–1915; 1918–1919
- Rank: Lieutenant
- Service number: 7504
- Units: Cameronians (Scottish Rifles); Army Service Corps
- Conflicts: World War I
- Awards: Victoria Cross

Lieutenant Henry May VC (29 July 1885 – 26 July 1941) was a Scottish recipient of the Victoria Cross, the highest and most prestigious award for gallantry in the face of the enemy that can be awarded to British and Commonwealth forces.

== Early life ==
Henry was born 29 July 1885 in Bridgeton, Glasgow, to William and Maggie May.

He attended Dalmarnock Public School in Bridgeton and enlisted in the Army on 29 August 1902 at the age of seventeen. He served as a rifleman in the 1st Battalion, Cameronians (Scottish Rifles), British Army during the First World War.

== Freemasonry ==
He was Initiated into Freemasonry in The Lodge of Glasgow, No. 441, (Glasgow, Scotland) on 24 April, Passed on 12 June and Raised 10 July 1914.

== Victoria Cross ==
On 22 October 1914 in France, May rescued Lieutenant Douglas Graham. May dragged him 300 yards whilst under fire. Earlier in the same day May had voluntarily attempted a rescue of a heavily wounded man, who died before May could reach him.

The citation was published in a supplement to the London Gazette of 16 April 1915, dated 19 April 1915, and read:

War Office, 19th April, 1915.
His Majesty the KING has been graciously pleased to approve of the grant of the Victoria Cross to the undermentioned Officer, Non-commissioned Officer and Men for their conspicuous acts of bravery and devotion to duty whilst serving with the Expeditionary Force: —
[...]
No. 7504 Private Henry May, 1st Battalion, The Cameronians (Scottish Rifles).
For most conspicuous bravery near La Boutillerie, on 22nd October, 1914, in voluntarily endeavouring to rescue, under very heavy fire, a wounded man, who was killed before he could save him, and subsequently, on the same day, in carrying a wounded Officer a distance of 300 yards into safety whilst exposed to very severe fire.

The Victoria Cross was presented to May by King George V on 12 August 1915.

== Later life ==
Henry May was initially discharged from the Army on 28 August 1915 after receiving the VC, after 13 years as a regular. He later rejoined in 1918 and achieved the rank of Lieutenant in the Army Service Corps.

After the war, May returned to work in the textiles industry. He died on 26 July 1941 and is buried at Riddrie Park Cemetery, Glasgow, Section B, Lair 146. His Victoria Cross is displayed at the Cameronians Regimental Museum within Hamilton Low Parks Museum in Hamilton, Scotland.

In October 2014, an engraved granite paving stone was laid during a ceremony outside the People's Palace in Glasgow to remember May and his bravery. The ceremony was attended by his grandchildren. Glasgow's Depute Lord Provost unveiled the memorial and said "May [...] ranks among the very few men in the Great War who survived while carrying out the ultimate act of valour, risking his life to save the lives of comrades [...] He deserves our utmost respect and it will be a real honour to meet with his relatives".
