= Sidney Kirkman =

British army officer (1895-1982)

General Sir Sidney Kirkman GCB KBE MC
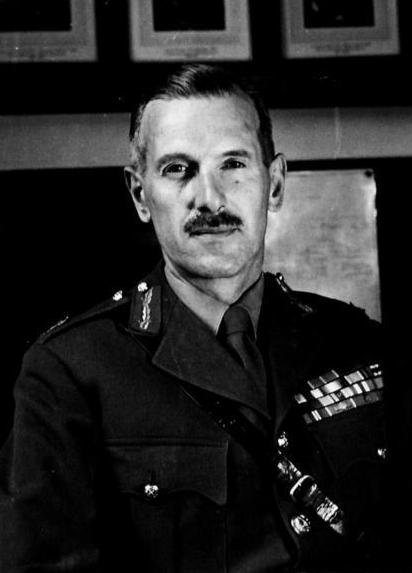
- Lieutenant-General Sir Sidney Kirkman in 1946
- Born: 29 July 1895; Bedford, Bedfordshire, England
- Died: 29 October 1982 (aged 87); Southampton, Hampshire, England
- Military career
- Allegiance: United Kingdom
- Branch: British Army
- Service years: 1915–1950
- Rank: General
- Nickname: "Kirkie"
- Service number: 5084
- Unit: Royal Artillery
- Commands: I Corps (1945); Southern Command (1945); XIII Corps (1944–1945); 50th (Northumbrian) Infantry Division (1943–1944); 65th Medium Regiment, Royal Artillery (1940–1941)
- Conflicts: First World War; Second World War
- Awards: Knight Grand Cross of the Order of the Bath; Knight Commander of the Order of the British Empire; Military Cross; Mentioned in Despatches; Legion of Merit (United States)

General Sir Sidney Chevalier Kirkman, GCB, KBE, MC (29 July 1895 – 29 October 1982) was a British Army officer, who served in both the First World War and Second World War. During the latter he commanded the artillery of the Eighth Army during the Second Battle of El Alamein, following which he commanded the 50th Division during the Allied invasion of Sicily and XIII Corps throughout most of the Italian Campaign. He later became Director General of Civil Defence in the Civil Defence Department from 1954 to 1960.

== Early life and First World War ==
Born in Bedford, Bedfordshire on 29 July 1895, the son of Judge John P. Kirkman and the eldest of two sons, Sidney Kirkman was educated at Bedford School, and later at the Royal Military Academy, Woolwich. During the First World War, Kirkman joined the British Army and, after passing out from Woolwich, was commissioned as a second lieutenant into the Royal Artillery on 10 February 1915. He served with the 72nd Brigade, Royal Field Artillery and was awarded the Military Cross during his time at the Western Front and later on the Italian Front. Promoted to lieutenant on 8 August 1916, he was made an acting captain on 4 January 1918, Kirkman ended the war with the rank of acting major while commanding a battery. He was awarded a Bar to his MC in 1918, and was twice wounded and mentioned in despatches.

== Between the wars ==
Between 1919 and 1930, Kirkman, having obtained a Regular Army commission in 1915, and unlike many others, remained in the army and served throughout the British Empire in Palestine, Malta and India during the interwar years. He was promoted to captain on 1 January 1925 (with seniority backdating to 3 November 1917).

On 21 October 1930 Kirkman relinquished his appointment as staff captain with Malta Command and returned to England. Between 1931 and 1932 he attended the Staff College, Camberley. His fellow students there included several who would later achieve high rank in the future, among them Brian Horrocks, Cameron Nicholson, Nevil Brownjohn, Thomas Rees, Bertram Cripps, Frank Simpson, Keith Arbuthnott, Arthur Dowler, Joseph Baillon and Ian Jacob. On 16 August 1932 Kirkman married Amy Caroline Erskine Clark, and they had two sons. After graduating from Camberley he served briefly with his regiment until he was, from 1 March 1934, a General Staff Officer Grade 3 (GSO3) at the War Office. Promoted to major in March 1935, he relinquished this appointment on 21 April 1936. He then completed a two-year staff posting to the Royal Air Force (RAF) School of Co-operation in January 1938.

== Second World War ==
During the Second World War, Kirkman served initially as commanding officer (CO) of the 65th Medium Regiment, Royal Artillery, a second line Territorial Army unit, which in 1940 was sent overseas to France to join the British Expeditionary Force (BEF), where it fought in the Battle of France, only to be evacuated at Dunkirk, along with most of the rest of the BEF. He was made an Officer of the Order of the British Empire (OBE) on 1 January 1941. He remained with the regiment until being promoted to acting brigadier on 23 March 1941 and being made Commander, Royal Artillery (CRA) successively in the 56th (London) Infantry Division, I Corps, VIII Corps, XII Corps and South-Eastern Command. Both XII Corps and South-Eastern Command were led by Lieutenant-General Bernard Montgomery, who came to form a very high opinion of Kirkman. Kirkman's rank of lieutenant colonel was confirmed on 22 May 1942.

=== North Africa ===
In August 1942 Montgomery was ordered to take command of the British Eighth Army in the Western Desert in North Africa. The following month, Kirkman followed him upon his new appointment as CRA of the Eighth Army (its chief gunnery officer). Montgomery, who thought very highly of Kirkman and requested him specifically, wanted to replace the Eighth Army's then CRA, Brigadier Noel Martin, and to replace him

I asked for Brigadier Kirkman from England whom I regarded as the best artilleryman in the British Army.

Kirkman arrived in Egypt in early September, shortly after the Battle of Alam el Halfa, and his first night there was spent in Montgomery's guest caravan, where Montgomery explained to him his plans for his forthcoming offensive, to be known as the Second Battle of El Alamein. He then informed Kirkman what he wished the artillery to do in the battle and, having such tremendous confidence in Kirkman, left him to plan for the artillery's role, and never once interfered. Almost forty years later, Kirkman remarked upon this particular incidence to Nigel Hamilton: "I mean if one looks back, almost any other Commander in history, having attached importance to an event of that sort would probably have said 'Is everything all right − are you happy?' Not a bit of it. He never mentioned it again. I mean I had plenty of interviews with him, mostly at my request but between that moment and the Alamein offensive he never again referred to the gunnery plan. He was satisfied that since I was there it would be as good as it could be. There are very few people who have that faith! Quite extraordinary from my point of view..."

The fire-plan for Operation Lightfoot required the field artillery of Sir Oliver Leese's XXX Corps, which contained five infantry divisions, and Herbert Lumsden's X Corps, with two armoured divisions, along with three medium regiments, which were then the only ones deployed in the theatre. Altogether, this made for a total of some 600 guns, with Brian Horrocks's XIII Corps adding a further 282 guns.

Operation Lightfoot's fire-plan came in two phases, with the first phase consisting of counter battery fire to neutralise the Axis guns. This required as many enemy gun positions as possible to be identified in advance. This was achieved through sound spotting, aerial photography and sound ranging, allowing for a very accurate presentation of the enemy's batteries. The operation's second phase was to consist of a creeping artillery barrage, which was to move ahead of the advancing infantry and lift at a specific time. This would allow the infantry to advance behind a huge carpet of fire on the enemy's forward positions. Brigadier Meade Dennis was in charge of this second phase of the operation.

The first phase of Operation Lightfoot began at precisely 21.40 on the night of 23 October 1942, when the infantry attack began. The guns did not fire all at the same time, being timed to ensure each artillery shell landed at exactly the same time. For 15 minutes counter-battery fire ensued, and numerous enemy gun batteries received a concentration of twenty guns to one. At 22.00 all the British guns opened up again, creating the creeping barrage at the same time the Royal Air Force (RAF) began bombing the Axis gun positions.

The artillery continued to provide support for the Eighth Army. However, by 26 October, it was obvious that Montgomery's plan for Operation Lightfoot was not going to succeed. Although the Axis positions had so far suffered very heavy losses, and their defences had been battered, the armoured divisions of Lumsden's X Corps were unable to break through into the open country beyond, thus necessitating more infantry attacks. At this time, however, Kirkman was becoming seriously concerned about the situation regarding the artillery ammunition. At the current rate of fire, he believed, the ammunition would last no longer than ten days. He explained his views to Montgomery, who told Kirkman that the battle would last another week. Nearly forty years later, Kirkman recalled the event with Nigel Hamilton. "I said to him, 'I've been going into the ammunition situation and it's very difficult to find how much ammunition there is in the Middle East. But as far as I can find out we can go with this battle for ten days at the present rate − but we can't go on indefinitely.' And Monty replied: 'Oh, it's quite all right, absolutely all right, don't worry about ammunition. This battle will be over in a week's time. There'll be no problem.' We argued a bit. I said, 'Well it wouldn't be a bad thing if we cut 13 Corps down to 40 rounds per gun per day anyway.' And he said, 'All right, we'll do that.' The point is this: When I saw Monty he was relaxed, he was by himself, quite amiable, talkative; and − there's no question − full of confidence". In the next few days Montgomery launched a new assault, Operation Supercharge, which was accompanied by a massive barrage of some 360 guns, all from Leese's XXX Corps. The operation took two days later but succeeded, and the ammunition stocks held out.

The pursuit of the retreating Axis forces now began, and Kirkman was critical of the speed with which the Eighth Army, in particular Lumsden's X Corps, pursued them. Reflecting later on the "lack of an effective pursuit" he then said: "But again, this is war. It is a terrible thing, but when you have got on well, had a victory, there's a tendency for everyone to sit down and do nothing. And we're particularly bad at this aspect of war − we were in the war anyway. But you can't blame it all on Monty. He didn't plan the pursuit well in my view, but who got through? Armoured cars! What a nonsense! Armoured cars are one of the most vulnerable...to think that the armoured cars had the guts, if you like, to break through as they did, and the tanks hadn't done it, is a terrible reflection on the tanks. It was the armoured car regiments, who had been kept out of all these casualties, kept in the rear [at Alamein], fresh, full of enthusiasm, who broke through. And Monty should have kept some tanks out for that purpose, in my view". Kirkman believed that a single division, or even a brigade, may well have brought Erwin Rommel's retreat to a halt. "You didn't want a whole lot of troops. You wanted at most a division − I'd almost say a brigade − it was all that was required. The place was cluttered up with too many people trying to get through. All that was wanted was one division under a determined commander − that's essential − that's all you wanted. You didn't want a whole Corps de Chasse. It didn't need to be an armoured division either, merely mobile. Might have been Tuker [Commander 4th Indian Division], might have been Bernard Freyberg [Commander 2nd New Zealand Division], might have been John Harding [Commander 7th Armoured Division]". Kirkman recalled, in particular, one incident, when he found Major General Alexander Gatehouse, commanding the 10th Armoured Division, who found himself spearheading the Eighth Army's advance. "Now I thought: in the First World War an empty road always worried me − because you always worried who was in possession: sometimes they were your property or the Boches'. I was always cautious about empty roads. I didn't go motoring on, I remained with those tanks, and eventually I found out they were the leading tanks of Eighth Army."

Kirkman continued as BRA Eighth Army until 19 February 1943 when, as part of a new policy to transfer experienced personnel from the Eighth Army to the 18th Army Group, commanded by General Sir Harold Alexander. He was not there long, however, as, upon Montgomery's recommendation he was promoted to the acting rank of major general on 14 April 1943, and appointed as general officer commanding (GOC) of the 50th (Northumbrian) Infantry Division, succeeding Major General John Nichols, who had lost Montgomery's confidence following the Mareth Line offensive. The division − understrength with only two infantry brigades (69th and 151st) instead of the usual three − was a first line TA formation with extensive experience and was then engaged in the final stages of the Tunisian Campaign, serving in the Eighth Army's X Corps, then commanded by Lieutenant General Brian Horrocks, who had been one of Kirkman's fellow students at the Staff College in the early 1930s.

Kirkman led the 50th Division to Enfidaville it was relieved by elements of the newly arrived 56th Division, and was withdrawn into Eighth Army reserve, later moving to Egypt, where it commenced training in amphibious warfare, having been selected for participation in the Allied invasion of Sicily (codenamed Operation Husky). While there the division was reinforced with the addition of the 168th Brigade, detached from its parent 56th Division, with which Kirkman had served before, bringing the 50th up to a strength of three brigades. Kirkman's division was, by the time he became GOC, a highly experienced formation, having served in France and Belgium in 1940, in the Middle East from 1941 to 1942, and in many battles in North Africa in 1942 (there losing its 150th Brigade). For the invasion the division was part of XIII Corps, commanded by Lieutenant General Miles Dempsey, who Kirkman knew from the Staff College, although Dempsey had, like Nichols, been in the year senior to him.

=== Sicily ===
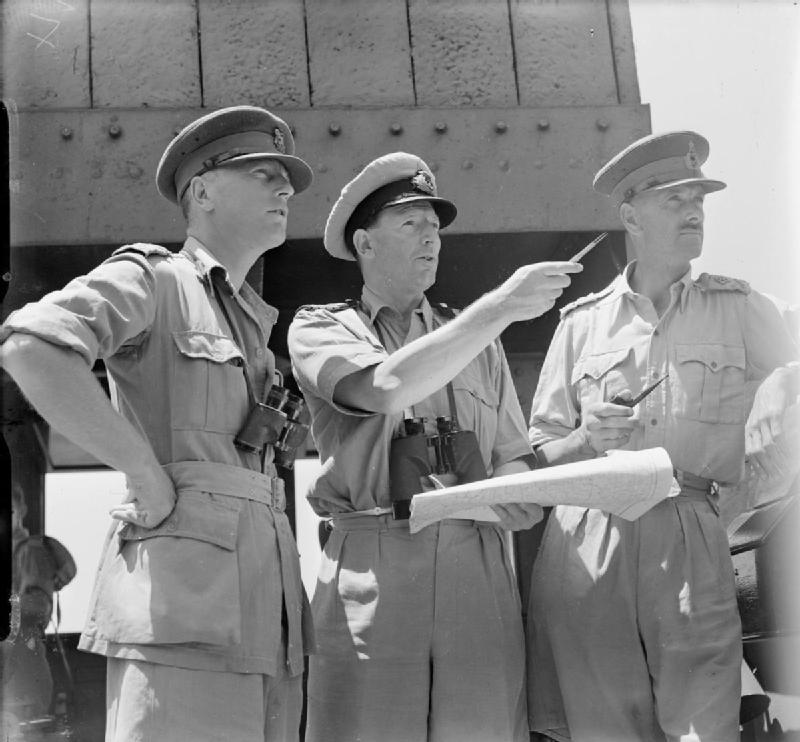
Left to right: Brigadier R. H. Senior, Captain P. S. Smith and Major General S. C. Kirkman on the bridge and watching the early stages of the invasion of Sicily on board the troop transport WINCHESTER CASTLE, July 1943.

He led the division during the Allied invasion of Sicily in July–August. After the Sicilian campaign was over the division was sent to the United Kingdom to prepare for the Allied invasion of Normandy, planned for the spring of 1944. Shortly before the relatively brief Sicilian campaign ended Kirkman was, on 5 August 1943, made a Commander of the Order of the British Empire (CBE).

=== Italy ===
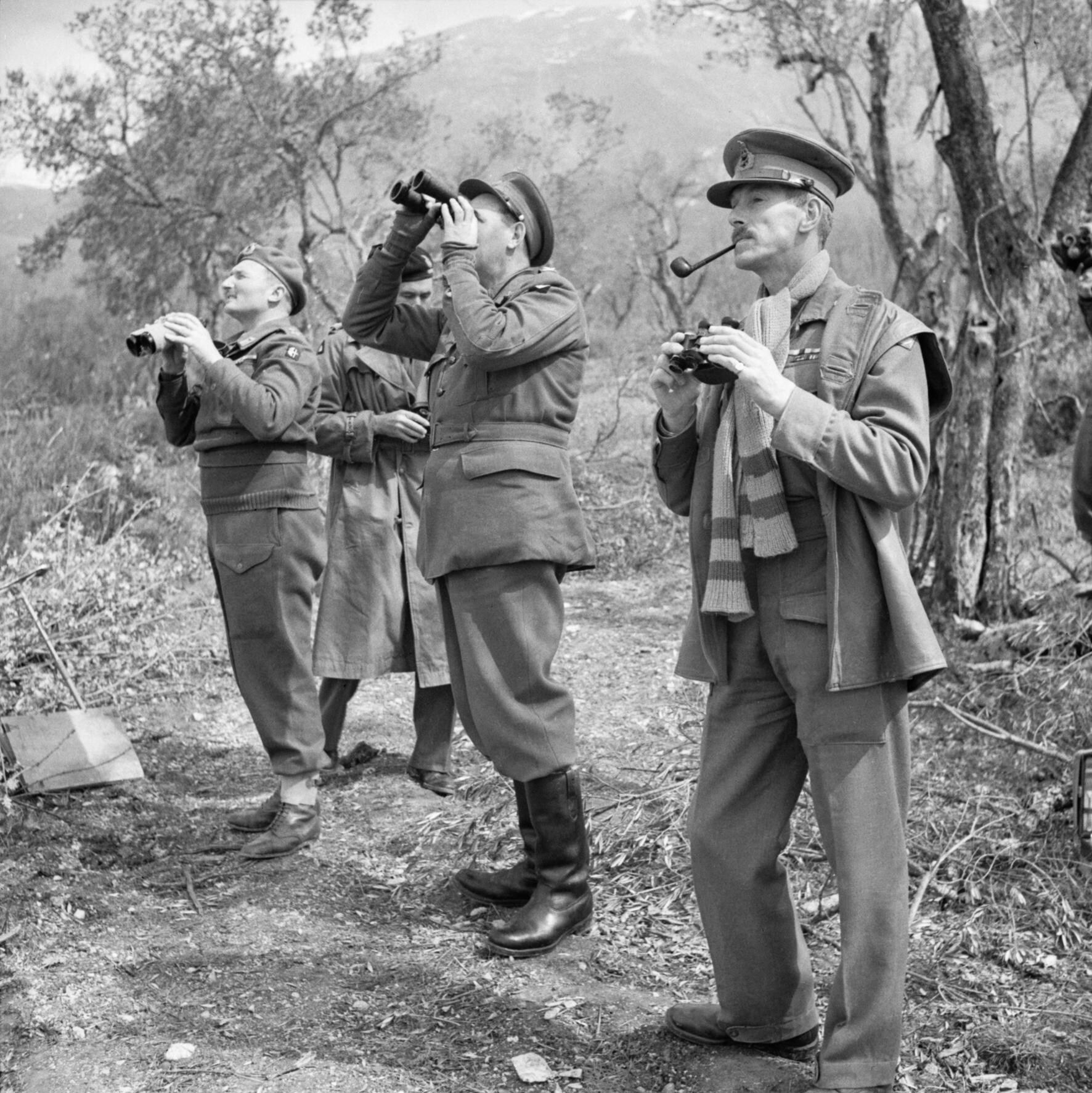
Lieutenant General Leese, GOC Eighth Army, with his corps commanders, including Kirkman, GOC XIII Corps, standing closest to the camera, watching an Allied bombing raid on Cassino, Italy, 15 March 1944.

In mid-January, however, Kirkman handed over the 50th Division to Major-General Douglas Graham and received orders to proceed to Italy to succeed Lieutenant-General Miles Dempsey, who was to return home to take command of the British Second Army, with Kirkman succeeding him as GOC XIII Corps. Therefore, on 20 January 1944 Kirkman was promoted to the acting rank of lieutenant general (although he was still only a substantive lieutenant colonel). Kirkman was requested specifically by Lieutenant General Sir Oliver Leese, who in late December 1943 had succeeded Montgomery as GOC Eighth Army, having formed a high opinion of Kirkman in North Africa and Sicily. Kirkman's permanent rank was made colonel on 24 March 1944, and his rank of major-general was made temporary on 14 April 1944, and was made a war substantive colonel on the same date.

XIII Corps, under Eighth Army, played a key role in the fourth and final battle of Monte Cassino in May 1944 and later came under command of the U. S. Fifth Army, under Lieutenant General Mark W. Clark, fighting on its right wing in the assaults during the autumn and winter of 1944 on the Gothic Line and central Apennines. On 1 June 1944 Kirkman was made a Companion of the Order of the Bath (CB). XIII Corps later returned to Eighth Army command in January 1945 but Kirkman himself, whose rank of lieutenant general was made temporary on 20 January 1945, was invalided back to the United Kingdom with severe arthritis in March, command of XIII Corps going to Lieutenant General Sir John Harding, formerly Alexander's chief of staff. He was appointed a Knight Commander of the Order of the British Empire in July 1945.

== Postwar ==
Throughout the period of 1945 to 1950 Kirkman was a member of the Army Council, initially as General Officer Commanding-in-Chief (GOC-in-C) of Southern Command, then as GOC of I Corps in Germany and then as Deputy Chief of the Imperial General Staff (DCIGS) in the War Office. From 1947 he was Quartermaster-General to the Forces until 1950 when he retired from the British Army. He was promoted to full general on 22 August 1947, He was appointed a Knight Grand Cross of the Order of the Bath in December 1950.

He was honorary Colonel Commandant of the Royal Artillery from July 1947 until July 1957.

Kirkman became Special Financial Representative in Germany from 1951 until 1952. In 1954 he became Director General of Civil Defence and held this post until 1960. From 1957 until 1960 he was also Chairman of the Central Fire Brigades Advisory Council for England and Wales. He retired to Hampshire where he died on 29 October 1982, aged eighty-seven, over forty years after the Second Battle of El Alamein in which he played such a vital, if relatively unknown, role.

== Bibliography ==
- Blaxland, Gregory (1979). Alexander's Generals (the Italian Campaign 1944–1945). London: William Kimber & Co. ISBN 0-7183-0386-5.
- Converse, Alan (2011). Armies of Empire: The 9th Australian and 50th British Divisions in Battle 1939–1945. Cambridge University Press. ISBN 978-0521194808.
- Hamilton, Nigel (1981). Monty: The Making of a General. London, UK: Hamish Hamilton Ltd. ISBN 0-241-10583-8.
- Hamilton, Nigel (1984). Monty: Master of the Battlefield. London, UK: Hamish Hamilton Ltd. ISBN 978-0-241-11104-8.
- Mead, Richard (2007). Churchill's Lions: a biographical guide to the key British generals of World War II. Stroud (UK): Spellmount. ISBN 978-1-86227-431-0.
- Montgomery of Alamein, Field Marshal (2005) [1958]. The Memoirs of Field-Marshal Montgomery. Pen and Sword Books. ISBN 9781844153305.
- Smart, Nick (2005). Biographical Dictionary of British Generals of the Second World War. Barnesley: Pen & Sword. ISBN 1844150496.

Military offices
Preceded by John Nichols	GOC 50th (Northumbrian) Infantry Division; 1943–1944	Succeeded by Douglas Graham
Preceded by Miles Dempsey	GOC XIII Corps; 1944–1945	Succeeded by John Harding
Preceded by Sir William Morgan	GOC-in-C Southern Command; March–June 1945	Succeeded by Sir John Crocker
Preceded by Sir John Crocker	GOC I Corps; June–September 1945	Succeeded by Sir Ivor Thomas
Preceded by Sir Ronald Weeks	Deputy Chief of the Imperial General Staff; 1945–1947	Succeeded by Sir Kenneth Crawford
Preceded by Sir Daril Watson	Quartermaster-General to the Forces; 1947–1950	Succeeded by Sir Ivor Thomas
