= XIII Corps (United Kingdom) =

Corps-sized formation of the British Army during the First and Second World Wars

13th Corps
- 13th Corps formation badge the First (left) and Second World Wars (right)
- Active: 1915–18; 1940–45
- Country: United Kingdom
- Branch: British Army
- Type: Corps
- Part of: British Expeditionary Force; British Eighth Army; United States Fifth Army
- Engagements: World War I; Battle of the Somme; Operations on the Ancre; Battle of Arras (1917); Battle of the Somme 1918; Advance in Flanders; Battles of the Hindenburg Line; Final Advance in Picardy; World War II; Western Desert Campaign; Second Battle of El Alamein; Tunisia Campaign; Allied invasion of Sicily; Italian Campaign

Commanders
- Notable commanders: Brian Horrocks; Miles C. Dempsey; Sidney Kirkman

13th Corps was a corps-sized formation of the British Army that fought on the Western Front during the First World War and was reformed for service during the Second World War, serving in the Mediterranean and Middle East throughout its service.

== First World War ==
13th Corps was formed in France on 15 November 1915 under Lieutenant-General Walter Congreve to be part of Fourth Army. It was first seriously engaged during the Battle of the Somme in 1916. On the first day on the Somme, 1 July 1916, the corps held the southern flank of the British line. The corps objective was the village of Montauban. The two assault divisions — the 18th (Eastern) and 30th Division, both New Army formations — seized all their objectives.

== Second World War ==
On 1 January 1941, while the Western Desert Force was fighting the Italian Tenth Army during Operation Compass, it was redesignated "13th Corps". It then included British 7th Armoured Division, Australian 6th Infantry Division and 4th Indian Infantry Division. During the initial attack, Matilda infantry tanks of the 7th Royal Tank Regiment along with the 11th Indian Brigade of the 4th Indian Division, exploited a hole in the Italian defensive positions and attacked the Nibiewa camp from the rear. The Maletti Group was destroyed and General Pietro Maletti was killed in action while trying to stop the sudden attack.

By February 1941, Operation Compass was a complete victory. When Operation Compass came to an end with the surrender of the Italian Tenth Army, 13th Corps HQ was deactivated in February and its responsibilities taken over by HQ Cyrenaica, a static command. Allied forces in the Western Desert took a defensive posture as Middle East Command focused on the Battle of Greece.

The Italian forces in North Africa were reinforced with the Afrika Corps. Axis forces, now commanded by Erwin Rommel, counterattacked. Lieutenant-General Philip Neame, the commander in Cyrenaica, was captured during Rommel's advance. 13th Corps was reactivated as Western Desert Force HQ on 14 April to take command of British and other Commonwealth forces (primarily Australian, Indian and New Zealand units) in the Western Desert.

In August 1941 Archibald Wavell was replaced as C-in-C Middle East by Claude Auchinleck and the British and other Commonwealth forces were reinforced to create in September 1941 the British Eighth Army. During this reorganisation, Western Desert Force was once again redesignated as 13th Corps and became part of the new army.

The Corps remained part of the Eighth Army throughout the rest of the North African Campaign, which finally ended in May 1943.

Still part of the Eighth Army, 13th Corps, now under command of Miles C. Dempsey, then took part in the Allied invasion of Sicily in July 1943. By now it had the 5th and 50th Infantry divisions under command.

Now with the 1st Canadian Infantry and 5th Infantry divisions, 13th Corps took part in the Allied invasion of Italy, executing Operation Baytown on 3 September 1943, part of the Italian Campaign. 13th Corps then fought as the right wing of the Eighth Army along the Adriatic coast until the end of 1943, participating in the Moro River Campaign.

In May 1944, 13th Corps, now commanded by Sidney Kirkman, was shifted to the left-centre of the Allied front. During the Fourth Battle of Monte Cassino 13th Corps elements, composed of the British 6th Armoured Division, British 4th Infantry Division and 8th Indian Infantry Division with supporting fire from the 1st Canadian Armoured Brigade, made a successful strongly opposed night crossing of the Garigliano and Rapido rivers, and broke into the heart of the German defenses in the Liri valley. This victory was of enormous significance as it collapsed or bypassed the German defenses of Gustav Line and led to the capture of Rome.

On 17 August 1944, 13th Corps was transferred to the U.S. Fifth Army to become its right wing. Under the Fifth Army, 13th Corps, with British 6th Armoured Division, 6th South African Armoured Division, 8th Indian Infantry Division, British 1st Infantry Division and 1st Canadian Armoured Brigade under command, fought in the Apennine Mountains to break the Gothic Line.

On 18 January 1945, 13th Corps returned to the Eighth Army. XIII Corps, commanded now by John Harding, was the left wing of Eighth Army in the Spring 1945 offensive in Italy, which ended in May 1945 with the surrender of Axis forces in Italy. 2nd New Zealand Division, operating with the corps, confronted Yugoslav troops at Trieste, entering and capturing the city. The Corps restored order in the strife-ridden city and enforced the Morgan Line from May 1945 to mid-1946.

=== 13th Corps assignments ===
Start	End	Superior body
01-Jan-1941	15-Feb-1941	HQ British Troops Egypt
26-Sep-1941	17-Aug-1944	British Eighth Army
17-Aug-1944	18-Jan-1945	U.S. Fifth Army
18-Jan-1945	31-May-1945?	British Eighth Army

== General Officers Commanding ==
Commanders included:

- 15 Nov 1915 – 10 August 1916 Lieutenant-General Walter Congreve
- 10 Aug – 16 Aug 1916 Lieutenant-General the Earl of Cavan (temporary)
- 16 Aug 1916 – 12 Jun 1917 Lieutenant-General Walter Congreve
- 17 Jun 1917 – 13 Mar 1918 Lieutenant-General Sir Frederick McCracken
- 13 Mar – 12 Apr 1918 Lieutenant-General Sir Beauvoir De Lisle
- 12 Apr 1918 Lieutenant-General Sir Thomas Morland
- Jan 1941 – Feb 1941 Lieutenant-General Richard O'Connor
- Sep 1941 – Feb 1942 Lieutenant-General Reade Godwin-Austen
- Feb–Aug 1942 Lieutenant-General William Gott
- Aug–Dec 1942 Lieutenant-General Brian Horrocks
- Dec 1942 – Dec 1943 Lieutenant-General Miles Dempsey
- Dec 1943 – Mar 1945 Lieutenant-General Sidney Kirkman
- Mar–May 1945 Lieutenant-General John Harding

== See also ==
- List of British Empire divisions in the Second World War

== Bibliography ==
- Heathcote, T.A. (1999). The British Field Marshals 1736–1997. Pen & Sword Books Ltd. ISBN 0-85052-696-5
- Jeffery, Keith (2006). Field Marshal Sir Henry Wilson: A Political Soldier. Oxford University Press. ISBN 978-0-19-820358-2.
- Robbins, Simon (2005). British Generalship on the Western Front 1914–18: Defeat into Victory. Routledge. ISBN 0-415-35006-9
- Badsey, Stephen (2000). The Hutchinson Atlas of World War Two Battle Plans: Before and After. Taylor & Francis. ISBN 1-57958-265-6.
