= George Lammie =

British Army general

Major-General George Lammie CBE MC
- Born: 10 December 1891; Glasgow, Scotland
- Died: 17 June 1946 (aged 54)
- Military career
- Allegiance: United Kingdom
- Branch: British Army
- Service years: 1914–1946
- Rank: Major-General
- Commands: 3rd District, Allied Central Mediterranean Force (1944–45); 147th Infantry Brigade (1940–41)
- Conflicts: First World War; Arab revolt in Palestine; Second World War
- Awards: Commander of the Order of the British Empire; Military Cross; Mentioned in Despatches (2)

Major-General George Lammie, CBE, MC (10 December 1891 – 17 June 1946) was a senior officer in the British Army.

== Military career ==
Lammie was born in Glasgow and educated at George Watson's College, Edinburgh. He was commissioned into the London Scottish (Territorial Force) to the Royal Scots in 1914 and served in France in the First World War, where he was mentioned in despatches and awarded the Military Cross.

Lammie was married in 1918, attended the Staff College, Camberley, from 1924 to 1925, and was appointed a brigade major in January 1928. He transferred to the Seaforth Highlanders in 1930 and served in Palestine in 1936 to 1937 during the Arab revolt, for which he was mentioned in despatches. He later served on the staff at the War Office from 1938 to 1939.

Lammie served as a staff officer with Home Forces in 1940, commanded the 147th Infantry Brigade from 1940 to 1941, and served on garrison duties in Iceland for a year. He was briefly Deputy Adjutant and Quartermaster General of Scottish Command in 1941, was Director of Quartering at the War Office from 1941 to 1944, and was commander of 3rd District, Italy, Central Mediterranean Force, from 1944 to 1945. He retired from the army in 1946.

== Bibliography ==
- Smart, Nick (2005). Biographical Dictionary of British Generals of the Second World War. Barnesley: Pen & Sword. ISBN 1844150496.
