= Otto Lund =

British Army general (1891–1956)

Lieutenant-General Sir Otto Lund KCB DSO
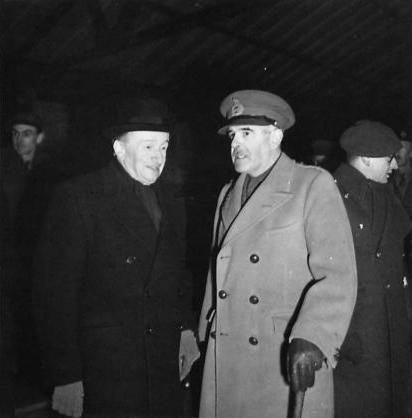
- Major-General Lund (right) with Henryk Strasburger in 1945
- Born: 28 November 1891; Lambeth, London, England
- Died: 15 August 1956 (aged 64); Kensington, London, England
- Military career
- Allegiance: United Kingdom
- Branch: British Army
- Service years: 1911–1948
- Rank: Lieutenant-General
- Service number: 6783
- Unit: Royal Artillery
- Commands: Anti-Aircraft Command (1946–48)
- Conflicts: First World War; Second World War
- Awards: Knight Commander of the Order of the Bath; Distinguished Service Order; Mentioned in Despatches

Lieutenant-General Sir Otto Marling Lund, KCB, DSO (28 November 1891 – 15 August 1956) was a senior British Army officer who served as General Officer Commanding-in-Chief Anti-Aircraft Command.

== Military career ==
Lund was educated at Winchester College and the Royal Military Academy, Woolwich, before being commissioned into the Royal Artillery in 1911.

Lund served in the First World War, taking part in the retreat from Mons, and after the war became aide-de-camp to Lord Rawlinson, before becoming an assistant military secretary in April 1923. After attending the Staff College, Camberley, from 1924 to 1925 and tours with Eastern Command and Aldershot Command, he became brigade major for the 2nd Infantry Brigade in 1928. In 1931 he joined the General Staff at the Staff College, Camberley, and in 1934 he became Military Assistant to Archibald Montgomery-Massingberd, the Chief of the Imperial General Staff at the War Office, where he remained as a General Staff Officer until the outbreak of the Second World War.

Lund was briefly Deputy Director of Operations at the War Office before becoming Major General Royal Artillery for the Home Forces and then Major General Royal Artillery for 21st Army Group. In 1944, after being replaced in his position by Meade Edward Dennis, he was made Director Royal Artillery at the War Office. He was appointed General Officer Commanding-in-Chief of Anti-Aircraft Command in 1946; he retired in 1948. In the words of Richard Mead, Lund "played a key role in ensuring that the Royal Artillery met or exceeded all expectations."

He became Chief Commissioner of the St John Ambulance Brigade.

== Personal life ==
Lund married Margaret Phyllis Frances Harrison and they had one son and one daughter. He died in London, aged 64.

== Bibliography ==
- Mead, Richard (2007). Churchill's Lions: a biographical guide to the key British generals of World War II. Stroud (UK): Spellmount. ISBN 978-1-86227-431-0.
- Smart, Nick (2005). Biographical Dictionary of British Generals of the Second World War. Barnesley: Pen & Sword. ISBN 1844150496.

Military offices
Preceded by Sir William Green	GOC-in-C Anti-Aircraft Command; 1946–1948	Succeeded by Sir Ivor Thomas
