= Ivor Thomas (British Army officer) =

British Army general

General Sir Ivor Thomas GCB KBE DSO MC & Bar
- Born: 23 July 1893; Marylebone, England
- Died: 29 August 1972 (aged 79); Salisbury, Rhodesia
- Relatives: John Thomas (father)
- Military career
- Allegiance: United Kingdom
- Branch: British Army
- Service years: 1912–1952
- Rank: General
- Nicknames: "Butcher Thomas" "von Thoma"
- Service number: 1374
- Units: Royal Field Artillery; Royal Artillery
- Commands: Anti-Aircraft Command (1948–1950); I Corps (1945–1947); 43rd (Wessex) Infantry Division (1942–1945)
- Conflicts: First World War; Second World War
- Awards: Knight Grand Cross of the Order of the Bath; Knight Commander of the Order of the British Empire; Distinguished Service Order; Military Cross & Bar; Mentioned in Despatches (4); Officer of the Legion of Honour (France); Croix de guerre (France); Knight Grand Cross of the Order of the Orange-Nassau (Netherlands); Commander of the Order of Leopold II (Belgium); Croix de guerre (Belgium)

General Sir Gwilym Ivor Thomas, GCB, KBE, DSO, MC & Bar (23 July 1893 – 29 August 1972) was a senior British Army officer who saw active service in both World Wars. He is most notable for commanding the 43rd (Wessex) Infantry Division throughout the campaign in Western Europe from June 1944 until Victory in Europe Day in May 1945, and later rose to become Quartermaster-General to the Forces.

== Early life and military career ==
Born in Marylebone, London, on 23 July 1893, Ivor Thomas was the son of John Thomas, the harpist to Queen Victoria and King Edward VII and Joan Francis, the youngest daughter of William Denny. He attended Cheltenham College in Gloucestershire and later the Royal Military Academy, Woolwich, from where he was commissioned into the Royal Field Artillery on 20 December 1912.

Thomas fought in the First World War, arriving on the Western Front from India with II Battery, XIII Brigade, Royal Field Artillery, part of the 7th (Meerut) Division, in October 1914. Still a second lieutenant when war began, Thomas rose rapidly in rank, being made a lieutenant on 9 June 1915, a temporary captain on 12 January 1916 (made permanent on 20 December 1916, four years since he was commissioned), and an acting major on 10 April 1917, which he held for only five days, but he regained the rank on 15 June, which he held until 2 October, when he again reverted to his permanent rank of captain. He remained on the Western Front throughout the conflict, was wounded twice, awarded the Military Cross in January 1917 (and Bar, awarded in September 1917) and Mentioned in Despatches in 1917, and, in January 1918, received the Distinguished Service Order (DSO). The citation for the medal reads:

For conspicuous gallantry and devotion to duty. When his battery was being relieved the position was shelled by an intense bombardment, which lasted for over two hours and caused many casualties in both batteries. The pits and ammunition of one section caught fire, and he succeeded in extinguishing this. Later, the telephone pit and mess shelter were wrecked, and he immediately led the way to the rescue of wounded men inside. The camouflage nets of three more guns were then set alight, and the ammunition began to catch fire. This he also saved by tearing down the burning camouflage and smothering the smouldering ammunition, some of which had already begun to explode. Not until all the fires had been extinguished, and he had seen every man, both wounded and unwounded, clear of the position, did he seek cover for himself. His great gallantry and exceptional coolness throughout the whole of this time were worthy of the highest praise.

From 22 September he served as a staff captain at the War Office.

== Between the wars ==
Relinquishing this appointment on 19 November 1919, over a year after the war ended, the first few years of the interwar period for Thomas were spent as an adjutant to various Territorial Army (TA) units, including the 68th (South Midland) Field Brigade, Royal Artillery, part of the 48th (South Midland) Division, until attending the Staff College, Camberley from 1924 to 1925. After this he became a brigade major with the artillery of the 1st Infantry Division in Aldershot Command from 1926 to 1930, during which time he was made a brevet major on 1 July 1929.

In 1931 Thomas served at the Royal Artillery depot at Woolwich, Kent, before in January 1932 becoming a General staff Officer Grade 2 (GSO2) to General Sir David Campbell, the Governor and Commander-in-Chief of Malta. After being promoted to brevet lieutenant colonel on 1 July 1933, he returned to England and attended the Royal Naval College, Greenwich, in 1934. This was followed by serving as a GSO2 at the War Office and later GSO1, being promoted to colonel on 12 May 1938 (with seniority dating back to 1 July 1937). Promoted to the temporary rank of brigadier on 14 July 1939, he was appointed Deputy Director for Recruiting and Organisation at the War Office, shortly before the outbreak of the Second World War, and then he was Director of Organisation at the War Office in 1940, by which time the war had begun.

== Second World War ==
In September 1940 Thomas, by now a temporary brigadier, became Commander Royal Artillery (CRA) of the 2nd Infantry Division, which had recently fought in France with the British Expeditionary Force (BEF) and was then commanded by Major General Noel Irwin before being succeeded by Major General Daril Watson, both of whom had been fellow students at the Staff College in the mid-1920s.

Thomas remained in this post until March 1942, when he was promoted to the acting rank of major general and became General Officer Commanding (GOC) of the 43rd (Wessex) Infantry Division, his first time in charge of a large formation of infantry, succeeding Major General Charles Allfrey, another artilleryman. The 43rd Division – composed of the 128th, 129th and 130th Infantry Brigades, along with supporting divisional troops – was a first line TA formation recruiting from the West Country, serving in Kent on anti-invasion duties as part of XII Corps, under Lieutenant General James Gammell, who was replaced in November by Lieutenant General Montagu Stopford who, the following November, was himself replaced by Lieutenant General Neil Ritchie.

In June 1942, three months after Thomas became GOC, the 43rd Division was one of many selected to be converted into a "mixed" division, of one tank brigade and two infantry brigades. As a result, Brigadier Manley James's 128th Brigade left the division and was replaced by the 25th Tank Brigade which, in September, was replaced by the 34th Tank Brigade. Two months later, on 11 November, Thomas was promoted to the permanent rank of major general. In September 1943, however, the experiment with "mixed" divisions was abandoned and, with the arrival of Brigadier Hubert Essame's 214th Infantry Brigade, formerly an independent unit, the division reverted to being a standard infantry division. By this time Thomas's division had been selected to participate in the Allied invasion of Normandy, then scheduled to take place in May 1944, as part of the newly formed British Second Army (initially under Lieutenant General Sir Kenneth Anderson but later replaced in January 1944 by Lieutenant General Miles Dempsey), and training in all-arms co-operation, already at a very high standard due to Thomas's energetic and ruthless methods, intensified, and he demanded only the very highest standards.

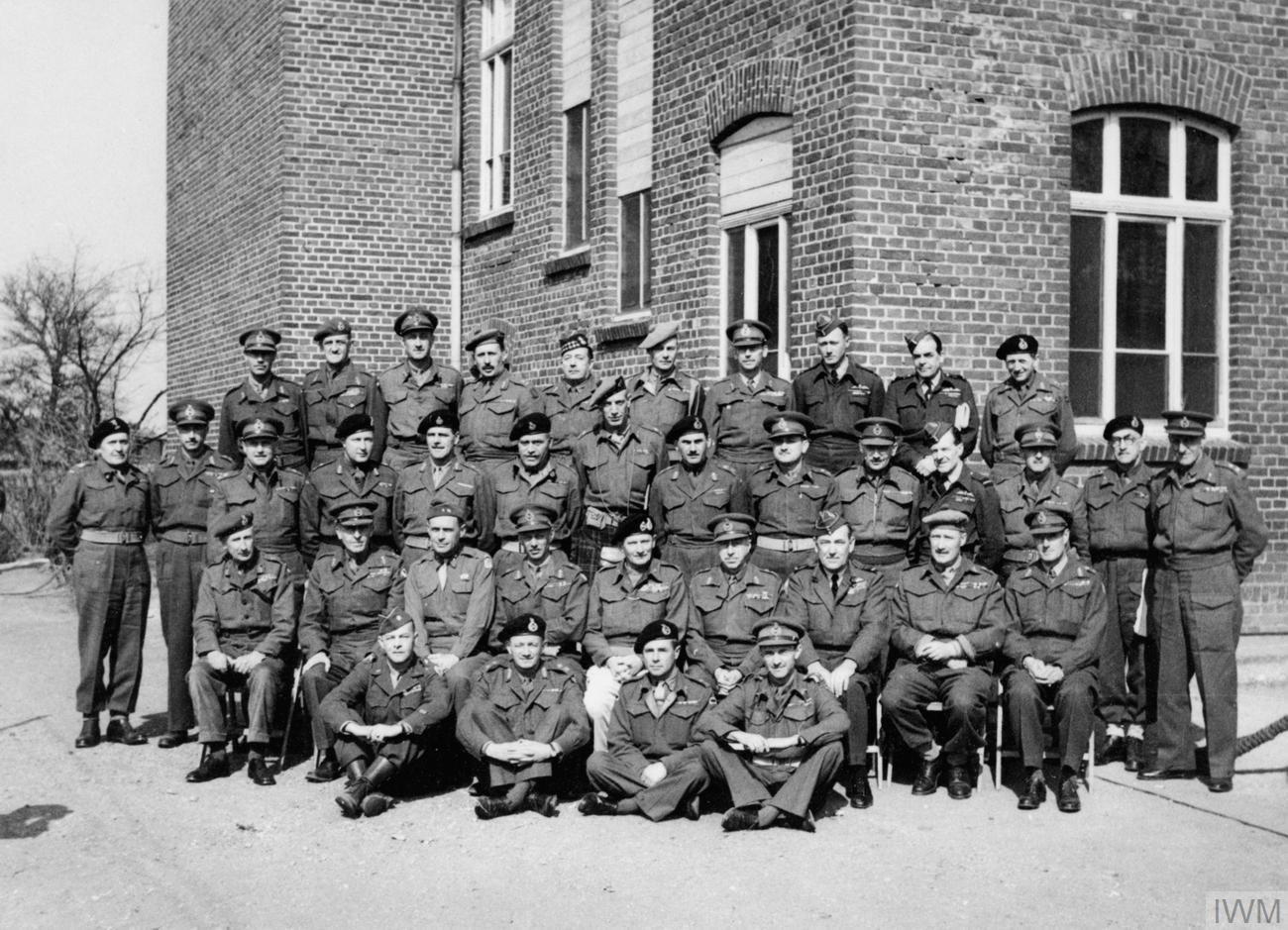
Field Marshal Sir Bernard Montgomery poses for a group photograph with his staff, together with his army, corps and division commanders, at Walbeck, Germany, 22 March 1945. Pictured standing in the second row, third from the right, is Major General Ivor Thomas.

After years of training under Thomas's command, the 43rd Division landed in Normandy in mid-June 1944, but was not immediately involved in any major engagements. However, casualties had already been sustained, by the 43rd (Wessex) Reconnaissance Regiment, commanded by Lieutenant Colonel Francis Lane Fox−who "Von Thoma" later sacked−which suffered severe losses before it even landed in Normandy. On 24 June, the 43rd Division was reassigned from Ritchie's XII Corps to Lieutenant General Sir Richard O'Connor's VIII Corps and, days later, took part in Operation Epsom, in an attempt to capture Caen, which, although a D-Day objective for the 3rd Division, still remained in enemy hands. The division only played a relatively minor role in the operation but played a major role in Operation Jupiter, the British attempt to capture Hill 112. The operation, which commenced on 10 July and ended the following day, was ultimately a British victory, but cost Thomas's division, along with the armoured support in the shape of Brigadier Michael Carver's 4th Armoured Brigade, almost 2,000 casualties. Carver later described Thomas as, "a small, fiery, very determined and grim gunner, without a spark of humour, he would bite the head off anyone who attempted to disagree with him or question his orders."

Transferring back to Ritchie's XII Corps, the division had little time for rest for its next battle, the Second Battle of the Odon. The operation was unable to fully achieve its objectives, costing the division further casualties it could ill-afford. It had, however, drawn the attention of the German panzer divisions away from the American front and onto the British front.

Still part of Horrocks's XXX Corps, Thomas's division's next role was Operation Market Garden. Thomas was closely involved in Operation Berlin to rescue the British 1st Airborne Division, and lead the ad hoc force in the defence of the Nijmegen salient early in October.

From 27 December 1944 until 28 January 1945, during the Battle of the Bulge in which the 43rd Division played no part, Thomas was temporarily given command of XXX Corps by Montgomery, while Horrocks, the GOC, was away in England to rest.

The division's next role was in Operation Blackcock. Again part of XXX Corps, which was now transferred from Dempsey's British Second Army to General Harry Crerar's First Canadian Army, the 43rd Division's next role was a major one in Operation Veritable.

== Postwar ==
After the war he was appointed GOC I Corps District within the British Army of the Rhine (BAOR) in 1945 and then Administrator for the Polish Armed Forces in the West under British Command in 1947. He became General Officer Commanding-in-Chief (GOC-in-C) Anti-Aircraft Command in 1948 and Quartermaster-General to the Forces in 1950; he retired in 1952.

== Bibliography ==
- Devine, Louis Paul (2015). The British Way of War in Northwest Europe 1944−5: A Study of Two Infantry Divisions. Bloomsbury Publishing. ISBN 978-1-4742-2564-9.
- Hamilton, Nigel (1986). Monty: The Final Years of the Field-Marshal 1944–1976. McGraw-Hill Book Company.
- Mead, Richard (2007). Churchill's Lions: A Biographical Guide to the Key British Generals of World War II. Stroud: Spellmount. ISBN 978-1-86227-431-0.
- Smart, Nick (2005). Biographical Dictionary of British Generals of the Second World War. Barnsley, South Yorkshire: Pen and Sword Books. ISBN 1844150496.
- Collins, James Lawton; Chandler, David G. (1994). The D-Day Encyclopedia. Simon & Schuster. ISBN 0132036215.

Military offices
Preceded by Charles Allfrey	GOC 43rd (Wessex) Infantry Division; 1942–1945	Succeeded by George Erskine
Preceded by Sidney Kirkman	GOC I Corps; 1945–1947	Post disbanded
Preceded by Sir Otto Lund	GOC-in-C Anti-Aircraft Command; 1948–1950	Succeeded by Charles Loewen
Preceded by Sir Sidney Kirkman	Quartermaster-General to the Forces; 1950–1952	Succeeded by Sir Ouvry Roberts
