= Thomas Riddell-Webster =

British Army general (1886–1974)

General Sir Thomas Riddell-Webster GCB DSO DL
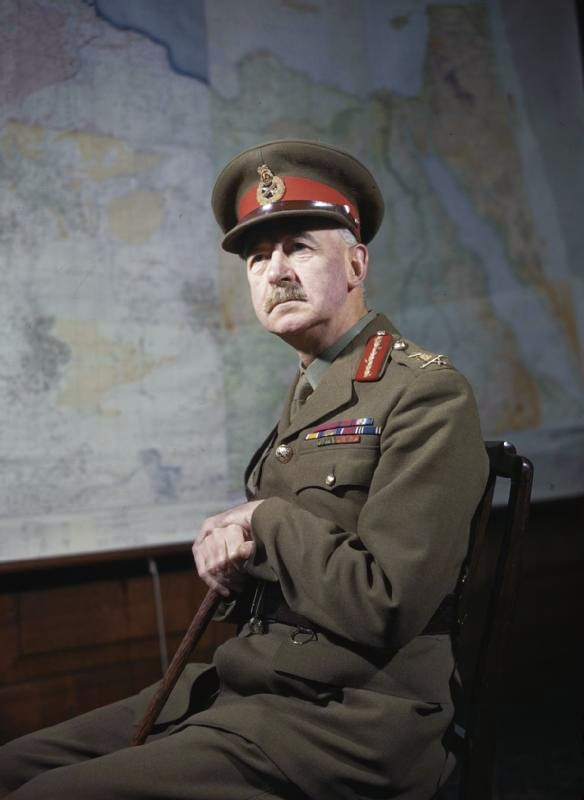
- Born: 12 February 1886; St Andrews, Fife, Scotland
- Died: 25 May 1974 (aged 88)
- Relatives: Alexander Sprot (father-in-law)
- Military career
- Allegiance: United Kingdom
- Branch: British Army
- Service years: 1905–1946
- Rank: General
- Service number: 1505
- Unit: Cameronians
- Commands: Southern Command, India; Poona (Independent) Brigade Area; 2nd Battalion, Cameronians
- Conflicts: First World War; Western Front; Second World War; Battle of France; North African campaign
- Awards: Knight Grand Cross of the Order of the Bath; Distinguished Service Order; Mentioned in Despatches; Officer of the Order of the Crown of Italy; Croix de Guerre (France); Commander of the Legion of Merit (United States)

General Sir Thomas Sheridan Riddell-Webster, GCB, DSO, DL (12 February 1886 – 25 May 1974) was a British Army officer who served as Quartermaster-General to the Forces during the Second World War.

== Early life ==
Thomas Sheridan Riddell-Webster was born in St Andrews, Fife, Scotland on 12 February 1886. He was educated at Harrow School and the Royal Military Academy, Woolwich, and was commissioned as a second lieutenant into the Cameronians (Scottish Rifles) on 16 August 1905. He was promoted to lieutenant on 30 September 1909 and captain on 24 October 1913.

== First World War ==
Riddell-Webster served in the First World War, initially as a staff captain (appointed 3 November 1914) then as a deputy assistant adjutant and quartermaster general in France (17 July 1915). He was brevetted to major on 1 January 1916. On 9 July 1917, he was appointed an assistant adjutant and quartermaster general, with the temporary rank of lieutenant colonel.

== Between the wars ==
After the war, Riddell-Webster relinquished his temporary rank of lieutenant colonel on 1 April 1919. He was promoted to the substantive rank of major and the brevet rank of lieutenant colonel on 3 June 1919. He married Harriet Hill Sprot, the daughter of Sir Alexander Sprot, on 28 February 1920. He became a Brigade Major with Irish Command on 21 July 1921. He was appointed Deputy Assistant Quartermaster General at the Staff College in 1922, and was brevetted to lieutenant colonel on 12 March 1923.

After attending the Staff College, Camberley, from 1924 to 1925, Riddell-Webster was appointed as a general staff officer at Scottish Command in 1926. He attended the Imperial Defence College in 1929. In 1930 he was made commanding officer of 2nd Battalion, Cameronians, and promoted to substantive lieutenant colonel on 16 December of that year. He was promoted to colonel on 27 June 1933, became assistant quartermaster general at the War Office that year, and commander of the Poona (Independent) Brigade Area in 1935.

== Second World War ==
Riddell-Webster was promoted to major general on 1 April 1938, becoming the director of movements and quartering at the War Office. He served in the Second World War, initially as deputy quartermaster general at the War Office (from 29 August 1939) and then as general officer commanding-in-chief Southern Command, India in 1941. He received the local rank of lieutenant general on 7 January 1941, and was promoted to the substantive rank on 15 April. He became the Chief Administrative Officer in the Middle East Command in 1941, for which he was mentioned in despatches. He was promoted to general on 1 November 1942.

Riddell-Webster became Quartermaster-General to the Forces on 6 February 1943. With his American counterpart, Lieutenant General Brehon B. Somervell, he co-authored a proposal to establish a ground supply route to China from Assam through Burma. He was promoted to full general on 1 November 1942. He also extended the use of collars and ties to the uniforms of other ranks. He retired with the rank of general on 27 April 1946 after nearly 41 years of service.

In 1946 Riddell-Webster was given the colonelcy of the Cameronians, a position he held until 1951. He became a deputy lieutenant for Angus, Scotland, on 14 August 1946, and was president of the British Legion (Scotland) from 1949 to 1965. He died on 25 May 1974.

== Honours ==
Riddell-Webster was awarded the Distinguished Service Order on 18 February 1915. On 12 September 1918, he was appointed as an Officer of the Order of the Crown of Italy. He was awarded the French Croix de Guerre on 19 June 1919. He was appointed a Companion of the Order of the Bath in the 1939 Birthday Honours, knighted as a Knight Commander of the Order of the Bath in the 1942 New Year Honours and promoted to Knight Grand Cross of the Order of the Bath in the 1946 New Year Honours. He was decorated as a Commander of the US Legion of Merit on 14 May 1948.

== Notes ==
Military offices
Preceded by Sir John Brind	GOC-in-C, Southern Command, India; March–October 1941	Succeeded by Sir Brodie Haig
Preceded by Sir Walter Venning	Quartermaster-General to the Forces; 1942–1946	Succeeded by Sir Daril Watson
