= Roger Bower =

British Army general (1903–1990)

Lieutenant-General Sir Roger Bower KCB KBE
- Bower in 1950
- Born: 13 February 1903; Andover, Hampshire, England
- Died: 9 January 1990 (aged 86)
- Military career
- Allegiance: United Kingdom
- Branch: British Army
- Service years: 1923–1960
- Rank: Lieutenant-General
- Service number: 24360
- Unit: King's Own Yorkshire Light Infantry
- Commands: Middle East Land Forces (1958–1960); Malaya Command (1956–1957); East Anglian District (1952–1955); Hamburg District (1958–1959); 6th Airlanding Brigade (1945–1946); 1st Airlanding Brigade (1944–1945); 1st Battalion, Border Regiment (1941–1942)
- Conflicts: Second World War; Palestine Emergency
- Awards: Knight Commander of the Order of the Bath; Knight Commander of the Order of the British Empire

Lieutenant-General Sir Roger Herbert Bower, KCB, KBE (13 February 1903 – 9 January 1990) was a senior British Army officer who served in the Second World War and later became General officer commanding (GOC) Malaya Command from 1956 to 1957.

== Military career ==
Roger Bower was born in Andover, Hampshire, England, on 13 February 1903, the son of Herbert Morris Bower and Eileen Francis Fitzgerald. He was educated at Repton School and later attended the Royal Military College, Sandhurst, from where he was commissioned into the King's Own Yorkshire Light Infantry on 1 February 1923. Among his fellow graduates were Robert Poole, Geoffrey Bourne, Ernest Down, Archer Clive, Francis Matthews, John Carew Pole, Hugh Stockwell and Ronald Littledale.

Bower served with the 2nd Battalion of his regiment in India from 1923 to 1930. Promoted on 1 February 1925 to lieutenant, after serving as his battalion's adjutant he then returned to England, where he attended the Staff College, Camberley, from 1935 to late 1936, and, like at Sandhurst, several of his fellow students were destined for general officer rank during the Second World War or in the years after. They included Eric Bols, John Whitfield, Robert Arkwright, Lewis Lyne, Geoffrey Bourne and Robert Poole, both fellow Sandhurst graduates, Freddie de Guingand, Leonard Holmes, Stephen Shoosmith, Charles Dalton, Charles Keightley, Charles Haydon, Walter Lentaigne, George Walsh, Horatius Murray, Charles Dunphie, Terence Airey and Gerald Lloyd-Verney. After graduating from Camberley, Bower, who on 1 February 1935 was promoted to captain, was appointed as a brigade major in Hong Kong from 1937 to 1938. He then returned again to England in November 1938 where he served as a General staff Officer Grade 3 (GSO3) at the War Office, in which role he was serving upon the outbreak of the war in September 1939. On 1 January 1939 Bower was promoted to the brevet rank of major.

Promoted on 1 February 1940 to major, Bower saw the early period of the Second World War in the War Office. However, on 23 April 1941 he was promoted to the acting rank of lieutenant colonel and made Commanding officer of the 1st Battalion, Border Regiment. Later in the year the battalion was transferred to the airborne forces and converted into a glider infantry unit. He also served at Headquarters 1 Airborne Corps in North West Europe and participated in Operation Market Garden, being personally involved in the attack by 1 Airborne Corps on Arnhem in 1944. He was commander of the 1st Airlanding Brigade in Norway in 1945.

After the war Bower was deployed with the 6th Airlanding Brigade to Palestine from 1945 to 1946 and then went to Hamburg District from 1948 to 1949.

He was appointed Director Land/Air Warfare at the War Office in 1950 and Director of Military Training and Director of Land/Air Warfare in 1951. He was General Officer Commanding East Anglian District from 1952 to 1955 and then Chief of Staff Allied Forces, Northern Europe from 1955 to 1956, when he was made General Officer Commanding and Director of Operations for Malaya. His final post was as Commander-in-Chief Middle East Land Forces in Cyprus in 1958; he retired in 1960. Following retirement, he was appointed Lieutenant of the Tower of London from 1960 to 1963.

Military offices
Preceded by Leslie Lockhart	GOC East Anglian District; 1952–1955	Succeeded by Reginald Harding
Preceded by Sir Geoffrey Bourne	GOC Malaya; 1956–1957	Post disbanded
Preceded by Sir Geoffrey Bourne	C-in-C Middle East Land Forces; 1958–1960	Succeeded by Sir Richard Anderson
Honorary titles
Preceded by Charles Deedes	Colonel of the King's Own Yorkshire Light Infantry; 1960–1966	Succeeded by Sir Harold Redman
