= 31st Infantry Brigade (United Kingdom) =

31st Lorried Infantry Brigade 31st Infantry Brigade 31st Brigade
- Formation badge of the brigade during and after the Second World War
- Active: 1914–1919; 1939–1946; 1946–1956
- Country: United Kingdom
- Branch: British Army
- Type: Infantry formation
- Size: Brigade
- Engagements: First World War; Second World War

The 31st Infantry Brigade was an infantry formation of the British Army, which participated in both the First and the Second World Wars. The brigade was later reformed after the end of the war serving in the British Army of the Rhine until the end of National Service in 1956, which saw the reorganisation of the brigade as the 11th Infantry Brigade.

== First World War ==
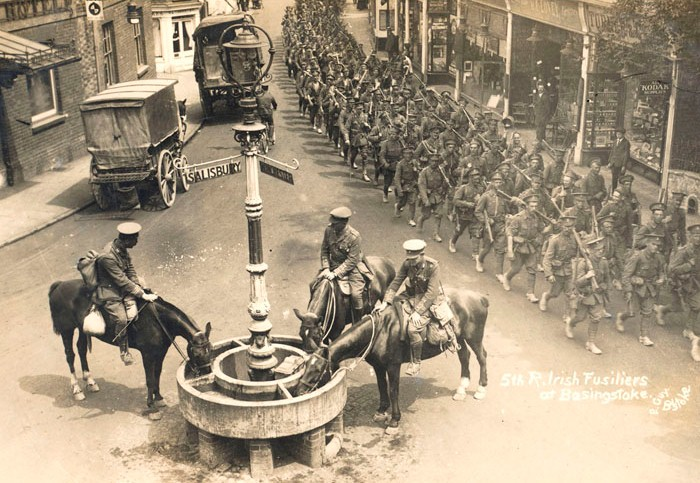
Men of the 5th (Service) Battalion, Royal Irish Fusiliers at Basingstoke in May or June 1915 during the battalion’s brief stay in Basingstoke before embarkation for Gallipoli. Incidentally it also shows the importance of horses in everyday life at the time of the First World War. The water trough stood at the junction outside the Wheatsheaf pub.

The 31st Brigade was originally raised in the First World War in 1914, by volunteers from Kitchener's Army. During the First World War, it was assigned to the 10th (Irish) Division and served in the Middle Eastern theatre at Gallipoli, Salonika and Palestine.

=== Order of battle ===
The brigade had the following composition:

- 5th (Service) Battalion, Royal Inniskilling Fusiliers (August 1914 – May 1918, transferred to 66th (2nd East Lancashire) Division)
- 6th (Service) Battalion, Royal Inniskilling Fusiliers (August 1914 – May 1918, transferred to 14th (Light) Division)
- 5th (Service) Battalion, Princess Victoria's (Royal Irish Fusiliers) (August 1914 – April 1918, transferred to 14th (Light) Division)
- 6th (Service) Battalion, Princess Victoria's (Royal Irish Fusiliers) (August 1914 – November 1916, absorbed by 5th Battalion)
- 2nd Battalion, Princess Victoria's (Royal Irish Fusiliers) (November 1916 – October 1918)
- 2nd Battalion, 42nd Deoli Regiment (July – October 1918)
- 74th Punjabis (April – October 1918)
- 2nd Battalion, 101st Grenadiers (May – October 1918)
- 38th (Service) Battalion, Royal Fusiliers (June – July 1918)

== Second World War ==
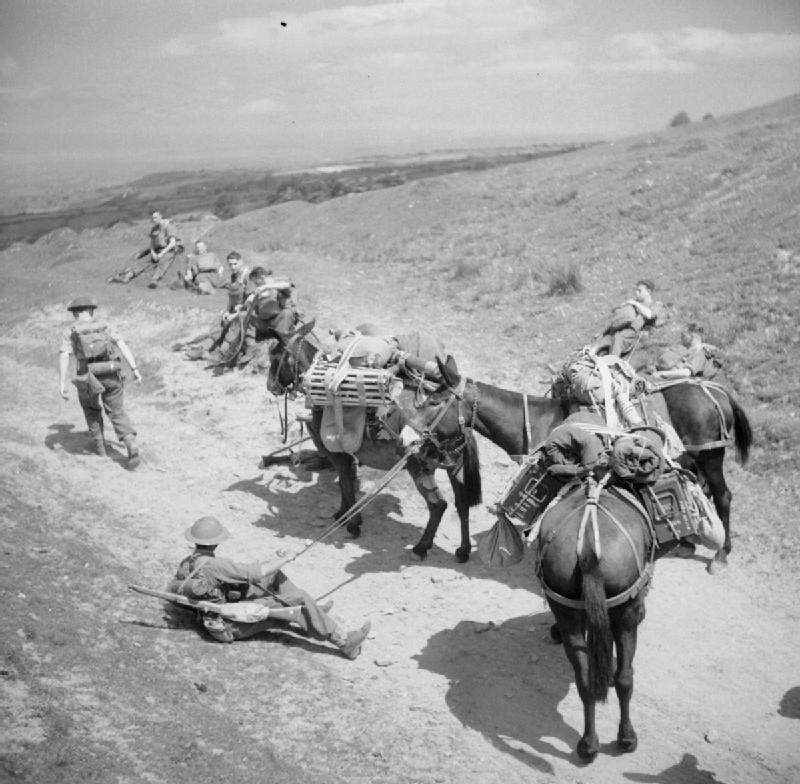
Mule teams from the 31st Independent Infantry Brigade training in the Black Mountains in Wales, 26 June 1941.

The 31st Infantry Brigade was formed in the Second World War as an independent brigade group. On 26–27 September 1940, it was assigned to defend the Royal Military Canal, a few miles from Hythe and Dover on the south coast. There is a detailed description of this defence area in British archaeological survey sources.

=== Order of battle ===
The brigade group had the following composition:

- 2nd Battalion, South Staffordshire Regiment
- 2nd Battalion, Oxfordshire and Buckinghamshire Light Infantry
- 1st Battalion, Royal Ulster Rifles
- 1st Battalion, Border Regiment – from 1 December 1940
- 31st Independent Brigade Group Anti-Tank Company – formed 14 September 1940; left 1 January 1941
- D Company, 5th (Prince of Wales's) Battalion, Devonshire Regiment (Machine Guns) – later 31st Independent Brigade Group MG Company (Devon); left 5 August 1941
- 31st Independent Brigade Group Reconnaissance Company – formed 1 January 1941

When the brigade operated as a brigade group, it included the following:

- Royal Artillery
  - 75th (Highland) Field Regiment – 'left 4 December 1941
  - 223rd Anti-Tank Battery – detached from 56th (King's Own) Anti-Tank Regiment
- Royal Engineers
  - 237th Highland (City of Dundee) Field Company – left 5 August 1941
  - 9th Field Company – from 48th (South Midland) Division 8 December 1941
- Royal Army Service Corps
  - 31st Independent Brigade Group Company – formed 5 August 1940
  - 39th Motor Coach Company – from 17 August 1941
- Royal Army Medical Corps
  - 152nd Field Ambulance – left 5 August 1941
  - 181st Field Ambulance – joined 31 July 1941
- Royal Army Ordnance Corps
  - 31st Independent Brigade Group Workshop – formed 18 March 1941
  - 31st Independent Brigade Group Ordnance Field Park – formed 18 March 1941
- Royal Military Police
  - 31st Independent Brigade Group Provost Section

=== Commanders ===
The following officers commanded the brigade group:

- Brigadier H.E.F. Smythe
- Brigadier George Hopkinson – from 27 October 1941

The brigade was redesignated as the 1st Airlanding Brigade Group on 10 December 1941 and came under command of the 1st Airborne Division. 'It probably lost its unique badge at about this time although it did not lose its Group status until 10 March 1943.' 223rd Anti-Tank Battery, 9th Field Company and other attached units became airborne units at this time.

On 15 April 1946, almost a year after the end of the war in Europe, the 6th Airlanding Brigade was renamed the 31st Lorried Infantry Brigade. This brigade wore a black desert rat on a red oval.

The following officers commanded the brigade between 1946 and 1956:

- Brigadier Roger H. Bower: April–December 1946
- Brigadier William R. Cox: January–December 1947
- Brigadier William P. Oliver: January 1948-February 1949
- Brigadier Cyril E.H. Dolphin: February 1949-September 1950
- Brigadier Frederick Stephens: September–November 1950
- Brigadier Victor D.G. Campbell: December 1950-November 1952
- Brigadier John F.M. Macdonald: November 1952-November 1954
- Brigadier Alfred (John) Tilly: November 1954-March 1956

== Bibliography ==
- J.B.M. Frederick, Lineage Book of British Land Forces 1660–1978, Vol II, Wakefield: Microform Academic, 1984, ISBN 1-85117-009-X.
- Joslen, H. F. (2003) [1960]. Orders of Battle: Second World War, 1939–1945. Uckfield, East Sussex: Naval and Military Press. ISBN 978-1-84342-474-1.
- Graham E. Watson & Richard A. Rinaldi, The Corps of Royal Engineers: Organization and Units 1889–2018, Tiger Lily Books, 2018, ISBN 978-171790180-4.

== External sources ==
- The Long, Long Trail
