= Charles Firth =

Charles Firth may refer to:

- Charles Firth (comedian), Australian comedian
- Charles Firth (coach), head coach of the Virginia Tech college football program
- Charles Firth (historian) (1857–1936), British historian
- Charles Firth (British Army officer) (1902–1991), British general
