= Victor Campbell =

Victor Campbell may refer to:

- Victor Campbell (Royal Navy officer) (1875–1956), British sailor and explorer
- Victor Campbell (British Army officer) (1905–1990), British Army major-general
