= John Eldridge (British Army officer) =

British Army general

Lieutenant-General Sir John Eldridge KBE CB DSO MC
- Born: 2 March 1898
- Died: 3 November 1985 (aged 87)
- Military career
- Allegiance: United Kingdom
- Branch: British Army
- Service years: 1915–1957
- Rank: Lieutenant-General
- Service number: 13420
- Unit: Royal Artillery
- Commands: Aldershot District (1951–1953); Military College of Science (1948–1951)
- Conflicts: First World War; Second World War
- Awards: Knight Commander of the Order of the British Empire; Companion of the Order of the Bath; Distinguished Service Order; Military Cross; Mentioned in Despatches

Lieutenant-General Sir William John Eldridge, KBE, CB, DSO, MC (2 March 1898 – 3 November 1985) was a senior British Army officer who served as General Officer Commanding Aldershot District from 1951 to 1953.

== Military career ==
Eldridge was commissioned into the Royal Artillery in 1915 during the First World War and served in France and Belgium. He was awarded the Military Cross in September 1917 for his actions during the war, and the Distinguished Service Order in January 1919.

After the war Eldridge was involved in operations in Iraq. He attended the Staff College, Camberley, alongside future general officers such as William Dimoline, Leslie Lockhart and Ashton Wade, from 1933 to 1934. He also served in the Second World War and was deployed to Italy in 1944.

Eldridge became Director General of Artillery at the Ministry of Supply in 1945 and commandant of the Royal Military College of Science in 1948. He was made General Officer Commanding Aldershot District in 1951 and Controller of Munitions at the Ministry of Supply in 1953; he retired in 1957.

Eldridge was a Founder Member of the International Institute for Strategic Studies.

== Bibliography ==
- Smart, Nick (2005). Biographical Dictionary of British Generals of the Second World War. Barnesley: Pen & Sword. ISBN 1844150496.

Military offices
Preceded by John Shapland	Commandant of the Military College of Science; 1948–1951	Succeeded by Basil Davey
Preceded by William Dimoline	GOC Aldershot District; 1951–1953	Succeeded by Edward Burke-Gaffney
