= Joseph Baillon =

Major-General Joseph Baillon CB CBE MC
- Born: 6 October 1895; Wandsworth, London, England
- Died: 11 April 1951 (aged 55); Cobh, County Cork, Ireland
- Military career
- Allegiance: United Kingdom
- Branch: British Army
- Service years: 1915–1949
- Rank: Major-General
- Service number: 10592
- Unit: South Staffordshire Regiment
- Commands: Aldershot District
- Conflicts: First World War; Second World War
- Awards: Companion of the Order of the Bath; Commander of the Order of the British Empire; Military Cross; Mentioned in Despatches (2)
- Other work: Director, Messrs Beamish and Crawford Ltd, Brewers, Cork, (1949–51)

Major-General Joseph Aloysius Baillon, CB, CBE, MC (6 October 1895 – 11 April 1951) was a senior British Army officer who served in both the First and Second World Wars.

== Early years ==
Joseph Baillon was the seventh son of Louis Augustin and Mary Julia Baillon (at some time residents of the Falkland Islands). He was educated at King Edward's School, Birmingham and at St Bede's College. He married, in 1925, Gertrude Emily Fellowes Prynne of Plymouth; the couple had two sons and one daughter.

== Military career ==
Shortly after the outbreak of World War I, Baillon volunteered for service with the British Army and was commissioned as an officer into the South Staffordshire Regiment on 30 January 1915. He earned his Military Cross during the advance to Abancourt in 1918.

As Adjutant during the advance through Abancourt on the afternoon of 9 October 1918, he frequently, under heavy fire, proceeded in advance of the battalion in order to find the route. Both before and after this event he carried out his duties regardless of his personal safety under the most adverse conditions, and often under heavy artillery fire.

Baillon remained with the South Staffordshires during the interwar period until 1931, as adjutant or as a staff captain. From 1931 to 1932 he was in England, where he attended the Staff College, Camberley, where Brian Horrocks, Sidney Kirkman, Arthur Dowler, Cameron Nicholson and Nevil Brownjohn were among his classmates. From 1936 and 1945, he was employed as a General Staff Officer in the Middle East, Australia and Britain.

In World War II, from September 1942 until November 1943 as an Acting Major-General, Baillon was Chief of staff for Persia and Iraq Command in 1942, under General Henry Maitland Wilson, its new head. They were concerned about the influence of Fazlollah Zahedi, the general in charge of the Persian forces in the Isfahan area, who, their intelligence told them, was stockpiling grain, liaising with German agents, and preparing an uprising. Baillon and Bullard asked Fitzroy Maclean, one of the inspirations for James Bond, to remove Zahidi alive and without creating a fuss. Maclean devised a Trojan horse plan: he and a senior officer would call on Zahidi to pay their respects, and then arrest him "at the point of a pistol" within his walled and guarded residence. At the end of this posting, he was appointed a CBE.

Baillon was Chief of the General Staff for the Mediterranean Expeditionary Force in 1943. He was made Director of Organisation at the War Office in 1945 and then General Officer Commanding Aldershot District in 1946. In 1948 he was made a Companion of the Order of the Bath.

He retired from the Army on 30 March 1949 as a Major-General. From 1949, Baillon was a Director of the Irish brewers, Beamish and Crawford Ltd, of Cork. Joseph Baillon died on 11 April 1951.

== Honours and awards ==
- Companion of the Order of the Bath 10 June 1948
- Commander of the Order of the British Empire (Military Division) 5 August 1943 (OBE 30 December 1941)
- Military Cross 2 April 1919
- Mentioned in Despatches 24 May 1918, 23 December 1943
- Commander of the Order of the Crown with Palm (Belgium) 15 February 1952
- Croix de Guerre 1940 with Palm (Belgium) 15 February 1952

== Bibliography ==
- Smart, Nick (2005). Biographical Dictionary of British Generals of the Second World War. Barnesley: Pen & Sword. ISBN 1844150496.

Military offices
Preceded by Sir Noel Holmes	GOC Aldershot District; 1946–1948	Succeeded by William Dimoline
