= Leslie Lockhart =

British army officer

Major-General Leslie Lockhart CB CBE MC
- Born: 5 June 1897
- Died: 27 March 1966 (aged 68)
- Military career
- Allegiance: United Kingdom
- Branch: British Army
- Service years: 1915–1952
- Rank: Major-General
- Service number: 13407
- Unit: Royal Field Artillery
- Commands: 307th Infantry Brigade; 5th Anti-Aircraft Group; East Anglian District
- Conflicts: First World War; Second World War
- Awards: Companion of the Order of the Bath; Commander of the Order of the British Empire; Military Cross

Major-General Leslie Keith Lockhart CB CBE MC (5 June 1897 – 27 March 1966) was a British Army officer.

== Military career ==
After attending and later graduating from the Royal Military Academy, Woolwich, Lockhart was commissioned into the Royal Field Artillery on 28 July 1915. He was awarded the Military Cross for services in the First World War.

Remaining in the army during the interwar period, he attended the Staff College, Camberley, alongside future general officers such as William Dimoline, John Eldridge and Ashton Wade, from 1933 to 1934.

He served in the Second World War as a colonel on the British Army Staff at Washington, D.C. from 1940, as Deputy Director of Royal Artillery at the War Office from October 1942 and as commander of an Anti-Aircraft Brigade in North-West Europe from 1944. He then served as Deputy General Officer Commanding the Anti-Aircraft Units of 21st Army Group in North-West Europe from early 1945 and as commander of 307th Infantry Brigade from May 1945.

After the war he became commander of 5th Anti-Aircraft Group on the East Coast in 1947 and General Officer Commanding East Anglian District in May 1951 before retiring in December 1952.

Military offices
Preceded by Sir Hugh Stockwell	GOC East Anglian District; 1951–1952	Succeeded by Roger Bower
