= Francis Arkwright =

Francis Arkwright may refer to:

- Francis Arkwright (cricketer) (1905–1942), English cricketer
- Francis Arkwright (politician) (1846–1915), MP for East Derbyshire 1874–1880 and Member of the New Zealand Legislative Council
