= Frederick Stephens (British Army officer) =

Brigadier Frederick Stephens CBE DSO
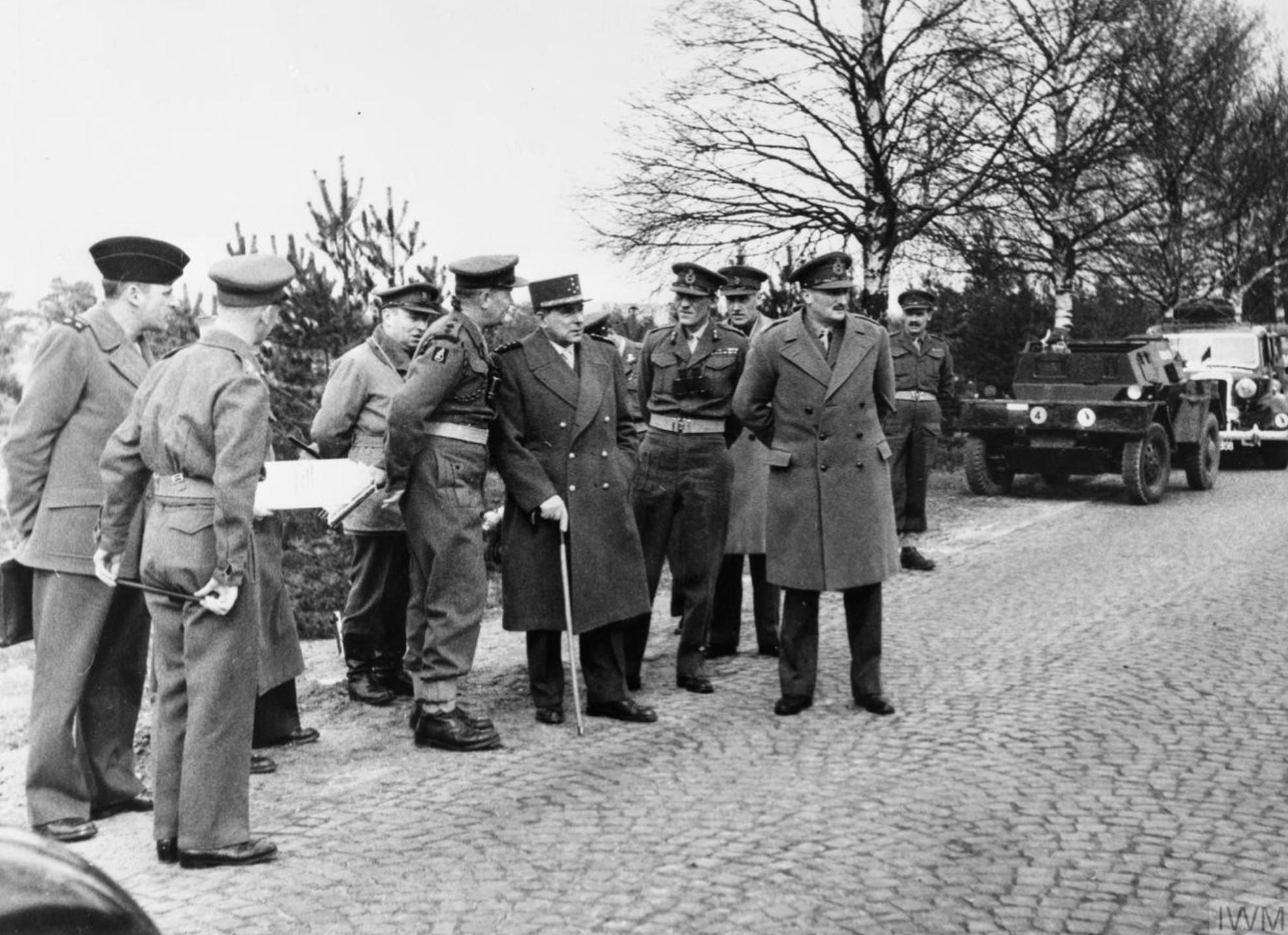
- Senior British and French Army officers observe a NATO exercise in Germany, 1950. Lieutenant-Colonel Frederick Stephens, CO, 1st Battalion, The Rifle Brigade, explains the exercise to a group of officers including Général d'armée Jean de Lattre de Tassigny, Major-General Robert Arkwright, GOC, 7th Armoured Division, and Lieutenant-General Sir Charles Keightley, C-in-C, British Army of the Rhine
- Born: 19 June 1906; Farnham, Hampshire, England
- Died: 9 November 1967 (aged 61); Farringdon, Hampshire, England
- Military career
- Allegiance: United Kingdom
- Branch: British Army
- Service years: 1925–1959
- Rank: Brigadier
- Service number: 33782
- Unit: Rifle Brigade (The Prince Consort's Own)
- Commands: 1st Battalion, Rifle Brigade (The Prince Consort's Own); 308th Infantry Brigade; 31st Infantry Brigade; Port Said Base
- Conflicts: World War II; Suez Crisis
- Awards: Commander of the Order of the British Empire; Distinguished Service Order; Mentioned in despatches

Brigadier Frederick Stephens CBE DSO (19 June 1906 − 9 November 1967) was a British Army officer of the Second World War.

== Military career ==
Stephens was the only son of Sir Reginald Byng Stephens and Eleanore Dorothea Cripps. He was educated at Winchester College and the Royal Military College, Sandhurst. He commissioned into his father's regiment, the Rifle Brigade, on 3 September 1925. Between 1926 and 1931 he served with the regiment in India, before a secondment with the King's African Rifles in British Somaliland until September 1936. He was promoted to captain in 1937 and became Deputy Assistant Quartermaster-General of the 1st Armoured Division in 1939. He served with the division in the Battle of France and North Africa until July 1942, when he was made Commanding Officer of 1st Battalion, The Rifle Brigade. In October 1942 Stephens was promoted to Lieutenant-Colonel and on 31 December 1942 he was invested as a Companion of the Distinguished Service Order. From August 1943 to May 1944 Stephens served as Chief Instructor to British Forces in Haifa. In July 1944 he became an instructor at the United States Army Command and General Staff College, before becoming Commander of the 308th Infantry Brigade in July 1945.

Following the end of the Second World War, Stephens was a general staff officer until March 1948 when he once again took command of the 1st Battalion, The Rifle Brigade. From 1950 to 1952 he was Commanding Officer of the 31st Infantry Brigade before serving as commander of British Forces in Berlin until 1954. Stephens served in the Suez Crisis during which he was Commander, Port Said Base and was Mentioned in Dispatches. Between August 1956 and February 1957 Stephens was posted to Southern Command. From 1957 to 1959 he was an Aide-de-Camp to Elizabeth II and he was invested as a Commander of the Order of the British Empire in June 1959. He retired from the Army on 29 June 1959.

On 25 July 1936 he married Esmé Mackenzie Churchill (1908–1987), second daughter of Colonel Mackenzie Churchill. They had one son and one daughter. Frederick Stephens is buried in the churchyard of St. Lawrence church, Lechlade, Gloucestershire.
