= General Lockhart =

General Lockhart may refer to:

- Leslie Lockhart (1897–1966), British Army major general
- Rob Lockhart (1893–1981), British Army general
- William Lockhart (Indian Army officer) (1841–1900), British Indian Army general

== See also ==
- Sir Charles Lockhart-Ross, 7th Baronet (c. 1763–1814), British Army lieutenant general
