= Maurice Chilton =

British Army general (1898–1956)

Lieutenant-General Sir Maurice Chilton KBE CB
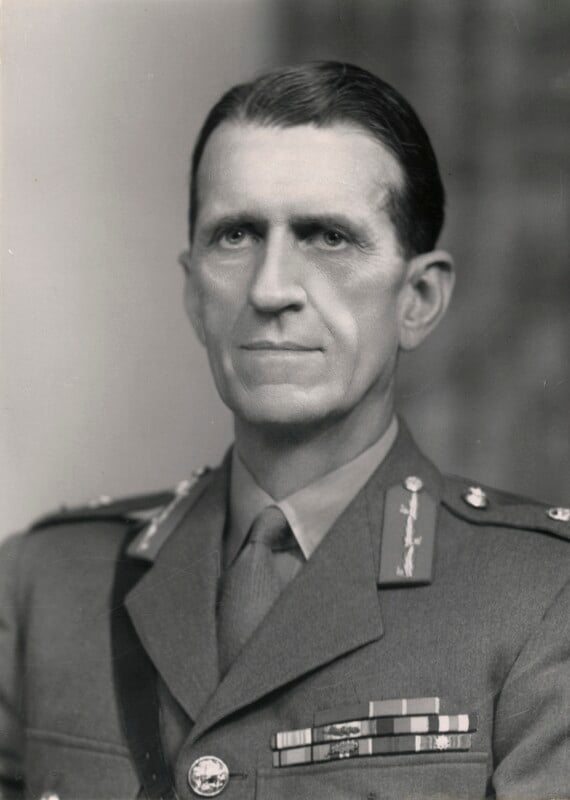
- Chilton in 1953
- Born: 11 January 1898
- Died: 21 August 1956 (aged 58)
- Military career
- Allegiance: United Kingdom
- Branch: British Army
- Service years: 1915–1956
- Rank: Lieutenant-General
- Service number: 13379
- Unit: Royal Artillery
- Commands: East Anglian District; Anti-Aircraft Command
- Conflicts: First World War; Second World War
- Awards: Knight Commander of the Order of the British Empire; Companion of the Order of the Bath; Mentioned in Despatches

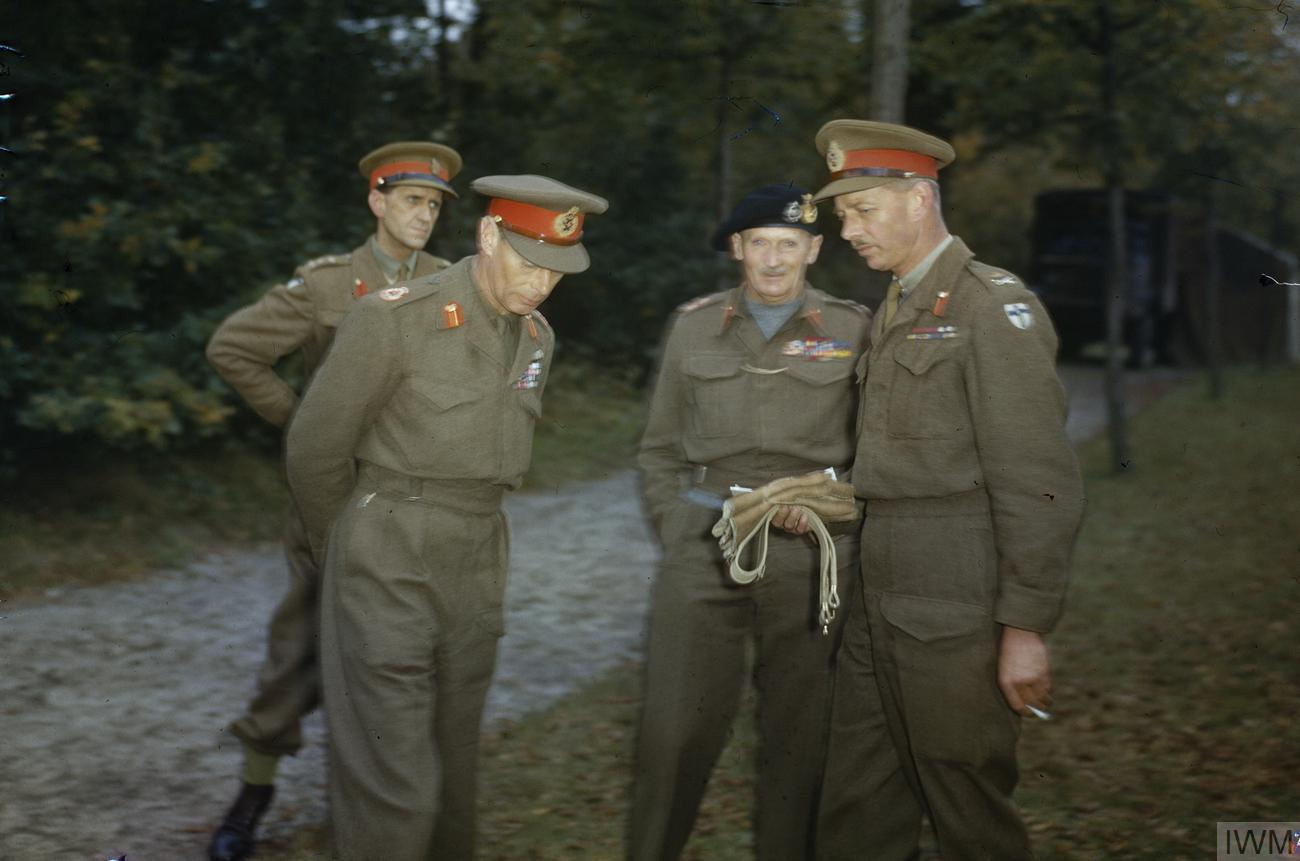
Chilton (left) behind King George VI with (from left) Field Marshal Montgomery and Lieutenant General Dempsey in The Netherlands, 1944

Lieutenant-General Sir Maurice Somerville Chilton, KBE, CB (11 January 1898 – 21 August 1956) was a senior officer in the British Army who served as Quartermaster-General to the Forces from 1955 to 1956.

== Military career ==
Educated at Rugby School, Chilton entered the Royal Military Academy, Woolwich and was commissioned into the Royal Artillery on 28 July 1915. He served in the First World War in France and attended the Staff College, Camberley in 1930. He also served in the Second World War latterly as Chief of Staff for the Second Army and then as Deputy Adjutant General for 21st Army Group.

After the war, Chilton became Director of Air at the War Office and then General Officer Commanding East Anglian District from 1948. He was made General Officer Commanding-in-Chief at Anti-Aircraft Command in 1953; in that capacity, he visited his units on Merseyside and Tyneside. He became Quartermaster-General to the Forces in 1955 and died while still serving in that role in 1956.

== Family ==
In 1926, Chilton married Margaret Sinclair.

== Bibliography ==
- Smart, Nick (2005). Biographical Dictionary of British Generals of the Second World War. Barnsley, South Yorkshire: Pen and Sword Books. ISBN 1844150496.

Military offices
Preceded by Cyril Lomax	GOC East Anglian District; 1948–1950	Succeeded by Charles Firth
Preceded by Sir Charles Loewen	GOC-in-C Anti-Aircraft Command; 1953–1955	Command disbanded
Preceded by Sir Ouvry Roberts	Quartermaster-General to the Forces; 1955–1956	Succeeded by Sir Nevil Brownjohn
