= John Macdonald (British Army officer, born 1907) =

British Army general (1907–1979)

Major-General John Macdonald CB DSO OBE
- Born: 1907
- Died: 29 May 1979 (aged 71–72)
- Military career
- Allegiance: United Kingdom
- Branch: British Army
- Service years: 1927–1961
- Rank: Major-General
- Service number: 38523
- Unit: King's Own Scottish Borderers
- Commands: 1st Battalion, King's Own Scottish Borderers; 28th Commonwealth Infantry Brigade; 31st Infantry Brigade; 52nd (Lowland) Infantry Division
- Conflicts: Second World War; Korean War
- Awards: Companion of the Order of the Bath; Distinguished Service Order; Officer of the Order of the British Empire

Major-General John Frederick Matheson Macdonald, CB, DSO, OBE (1907 – 29 May 1979) was a senior British Army officer.

== Military career ==
Macdonald entered the Royal Military College, Sandhurst, from where he was commissioned into the King's Own Scottish Borderers on 1 September 1927 and served in the Second World War.

He commanded the 1st Battalion, the King's Own Scottish Borderers on its deployment to Korea in April 1951 and then took command of the 28th Commonwealth Infantry Brigade in Korea in October 1951. His brigade saw action at the First Battle of Maryang-san in October 1951 during the Korean War.

He went on to be commander of 31st Infantry Brigade in November 1952, Deputy Director of Quartering at the War Office in January 1956 and Chief of Staff at Scottish Command in March 1957. His last appointment was as General Officer Commanding 52nd (Lowland) Infantry Division in 1958 before retiring in 1961.

== Works ==
- Macdonald, John F. M. Borderers in Korea. Berwick-upon-Tweed: Martin's Printing Works.

Military offices
Preceded by Rohan Delacombe	GOC 52nd (Lowland) Infantry Division; 1958–1961	Succeeded by John Frost
