= 54th (East Anglian) Infantry Division =

East Anglian Division 54th (East Anglian) Division 54th (East Anglian) Infantry Division
- Shoulder insignia of the 54th (East Anglian) Division, First World War
- Active: 1908–1919; 1920–1943
- Country: United Kingdom
- Branch: Territorial Army
- Type: Infantry
- Size: Division
- Peacetime HQ: Warley, Essex
- Engagements: Battle of Gallipoli; First Battle of Gaza; Battle of Mughar Ridge; Battle of Jerusalem (1917); Action of Tell 'Asur; Battle of Arara

Commanders
- Notable commanders: the Hon. Julian Byng; Charles Townshend; Evelyn Barker; Cyril Lomax; Sir Ian Freeland

Insignia
- Second World War division sign

The 54th (East Anglian) Infantry Division was an infantry division of the British Army. The division was raised in 1908 following the creation of the Territorial Force (TF) as the East Anglian Division. During the First World War the division fought at Gallipoli and in the Middle East. The division was disbanded after the war but reformed in the Territorial Army in 1920. During the Second World War it was a home service division and did not see any combat service abroad and was disbanded in late 1943 but many of its component units went to see service in the Normandy Campaign and North-western Europe from June 1944 to May 1945.

== Formation ==
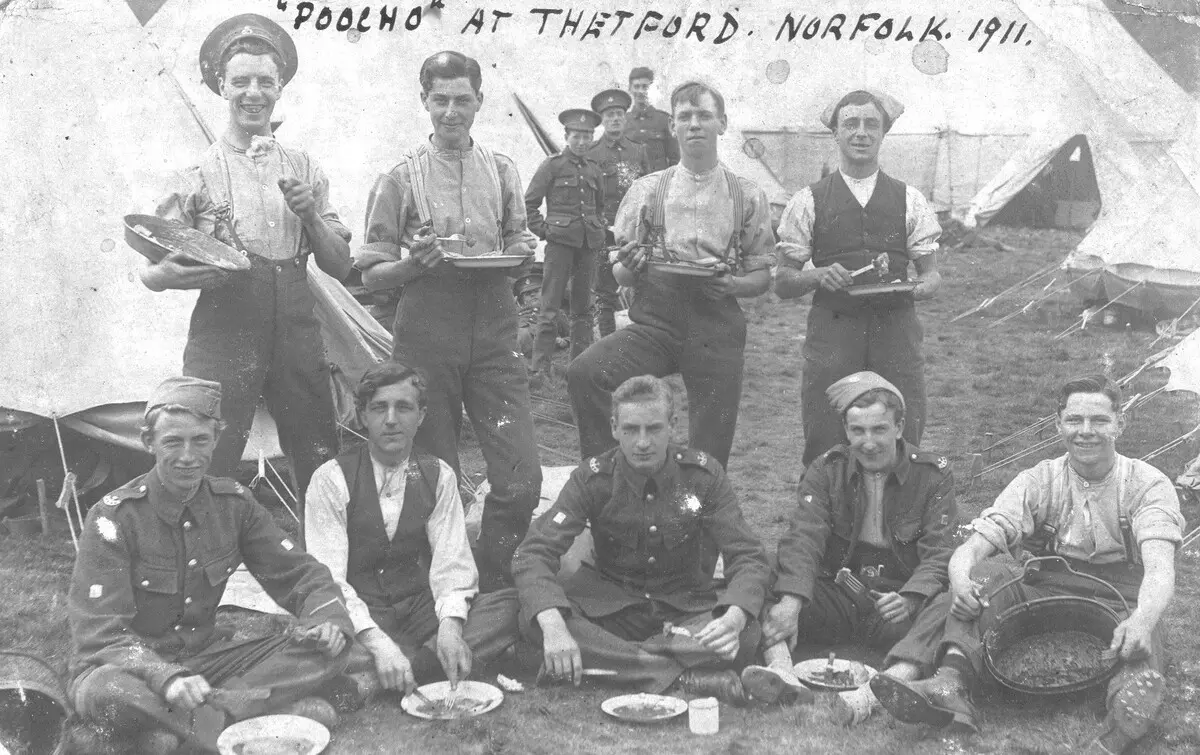
Men of the 1st Battalion, Hertfordshire Regiment, East Anglian Division, at Thetford Camp, Norfolk, 1911.

The Territorial Force (TF) was formed on 1 April 1908 following the enactment of the Territorial and Reserve Forces Act 1907 (7 Edw.7, c.9) which combined and re-organised the old Volunteer Force, the Honourable Artillery Company and the Yeomanry. On formation, the TF contained 14 infantry divisions and 14 mounted yeomanry brigades. One of the divisions was the East Anglian Division. The infantry of the division was composed of the Essex, East Midland, and Norfolk and Suffolk Brigades. Divisional headquarters was based at Claremont House in Warley, while the infantry brigades were headquartered at Brentwood, Bedford, and Norwich. Its subunits were spread across East Anglia and the East Midlands.

== First World War ==
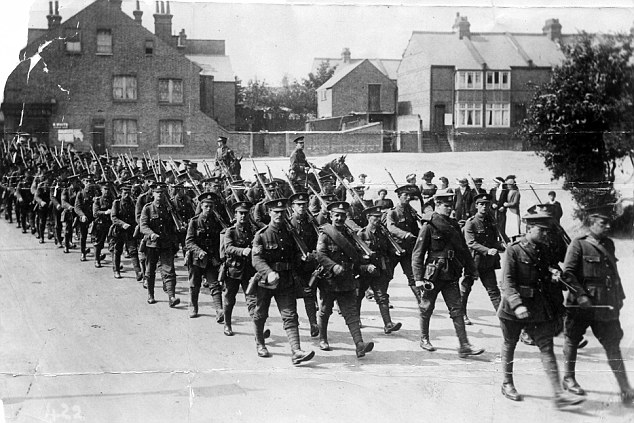
Men of the 1/5th Battalion, Norfolk Regiment, East Anglian Division, on the march somewhere in England, 1915.

While on annual training, the division was ordered to mobilise on 4 August 1914, concentrating in the vicinity of Brentwood by 10 August. After moving to Chelmsford, Bury St Edmunds, and Norwich on 20 August, the division served on coast defence duty. Three battalions – the 4th Suffolk Regiment, 1st Cambridgeshire, and 1st Hertfordshire – were sent to France between November 1914 and February 1915. They were replaced in April by the 8th Hampshires, 10th Londons, and 11th London. The battalions of the division were reorganised to include four companies (instead of eight) in January 1915, and in May it concentrated near St. Albans, preparing to be sent overseas. Its destination was revealed to be Gallipoli on 8 July. Leaving behind the divisional artillery and most of the train, the division departed St. Albans for Devonport and Liverpool between 20 and 30 July, boarding transports for Mudros, where it began arriving on 6 August.

The 54th (East Anglian) Division landed at Suvla on 10 August in the Gallipoli campaign, as a part of IX Corps under Lieutenant-General Stopford. By the end of 11 August, ten battalions and the divisional headquarters had landed. As part of the evacuation of the Gallipoli peninsula the division was ordered to re-embark from Gallipoli on 26 November, and returned to Mudros between 3 and 8 December. On 9 December, it included 240 officers and 4,480 other ranks, including reinforcements to bring the division up to strength. It began embarking for Egypt on 13 December, and arrived in Alexandria on 18 December. On the next day, it was concentrated at Sidi Bishr before moving to Mena Camp near Cairo.

As a result of the Senussi uprising, the 161st Brigade was sent into the Western Desert on 28 December 1915. Between 11 and 15 February 1916, the divisional artillery, which had been sent to France in November 1915 and attached to the 33rd Division, rejoined the division at Mena. The 161st Brigade returned to the division on 5 March, without the 4th Essex, which returned on 23 March. The division took over the southern section of the Suez Canal defences on 2 April, as part of the Egyptian Expeditionary Force, commanded by General Sir Archibald Murray. Then in the Sinai and Palestine campaign, during the First Battle of Gaza, on 26 March 1917, the 161st Brigade and divisional artillery were in reserve while the 53rd (Welsh) Division carried out the main attack. These reserves were committed as the battle progressed resulting in the British gaining a foothold in the Turkish defences but the British commander called off the attack as night fell. In the Second Battle of Gaza, the 1/4th and 1/5th battalions of the Norfolk Regiment sustained 75 per cent casualties (about 1,200 men). It took part in the successful Third Battle of Gaza as part of XXI Corps led by Lieutenant General Sir Edward Bulfin, and by the end of 1917 General Sir Edmund Allenby's forces had taken Jerusalem. The division fought in the Battle of Jaffa on 21 and 22 December.

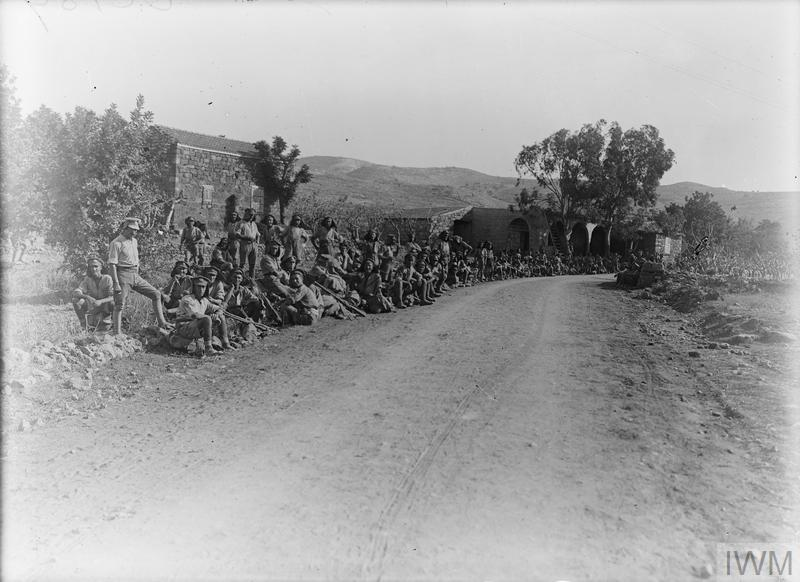
Men of the Norfolk Regiment resting on the road to Beirut, late October 1918.

The 162nd Brigade participated in the Fight at Ras el'Ain during the Battle of Tell 'Asur on 12 March 1918. The division fought in the attack at Berukin on 9 and 10 April/ In September 1918 the division took part in the Battle of Sharon between 19 and 23 September. After the end of the battle, the division concentrated at Hableh on 24 September and was ordered to move to Haifa three days later. It began advancing to Haifa on 28 September through Atlit, and finished concentrating there on 4 October, where it improved communications. The division was ordered to begin the advance to Beirut on 20 October, which was conducted by brigade group in daylong intervals. The advance began three days later, through Acre, Naqoura, Tyre, and Sidon. The division reached Beirut between 31 October and 5 November, as the war with the Ottoman Empire ended on 31 October.

The division moved back by sea to El Qantara from 28 November, beginning with the 163rd Brigade, and then moved to Helmie, where it concentrated on 7 December without its artillery and train. The divisional artillery and train arrived via El Qantara by 14 December, except for the CCLXXII Brigade, which marched from Beirut to Tulkarm before entraining for Helmie on 9 December. The demobilization of the division began on 6 January 1919 with the disbandment of the three brigade trench mortar brigades. The division personnel filled the time with educational courses in January as they were gradually demobilized. By 22 May only six battalions remained, and on 29 May the 77th Brigade joined the division and was renumbered as the 161st Brigade. The CII Brigade joined and temporarily became the division artillery on 1 June. The Territorial units were reduced to cadre strength and the war-time units were disbanded, with the division ceasing to exist in Egypt on 30 September 1919.

== Between the wars ==
The division was disbanded after the Great War when the whole of the Territorial Force was disbanded. However, it was reformed in 1920 as the Territorial Army (TA) and the division was reconstituted with Eastern Command, initially with a similar composition to before the First World War but, over the next few years, with a much different composition.

=== Buildup to the Second World War ===
Throughout the 1930s, tensions built between Germany and the United Kingdom as well as its allies. During late 1937 and throughout 1938, German demands for the annexation of Czechoslovakia's Sudetenland led to an international crisis. In an attempt to avoid war, British Prime Minister Neville Chamberlain met the German Chancellor Adolf Hitler in September and brokered the Munich Agreement. The agreement averted immediate war and allowed Germany to annexe the Sudetenland. Chamberlain had intended the agreement to lead to further peaceful resolution of issues, but relations between both countries soon deteriorated. On 15 March 1939, Germany breached the terms of the agreement by invading and occupying the remnants of the Czech state.

In response, on 29 March, the British Secretary of State for War Leslie Hore-Belisha announced plans to increase the Territorial Army from 130,000 men to 340,000 and in so doing double the number of territorial divisions. The plan of action was for the existing units to recruit over their allowed establishments (aided by an increase in pay for territorials, the removal of restrictions on promotion that had been a major hindrance to recruiting during the preceding years, the construction of better quality barracks, and an increase in supper-time rations) and then form Second Line divisions from small cadres that could be built upon. As a result, the 54th was to provide cadres to form a Second Line duplicate unit, which would become the 18th Infantry Division following the start of the war. In April, limited conscription was introduced. At that time 34,500 militiamen, all aged 20, were conscripted into the regular army, initially to be trained for six months before being deployed to the forming second line units. Despite the intention for the army to grow in size, the programme was complicated by a lack of central guidance on the expansion and duplication process and issues regarding the lack of facilities, equipment and instructors.

== Second World War ==
Upon the outbreak of the Second World War in September 1939, the 54th Division, commanded by Major-General John Priestman, a Regular Army officer, and serving under Eastern Command, was mobilised for full-time war service. Comprising still the 161st, 162nd and 163rd Infantry Brigades and divisional troops, the division absorbed hundreds of conscripts and spent the first few months of the war, after guarding various designated 'vulnerable points', training for eventual overseas service.

The division remained in the United Kingdom as a local defence formation, being downgraded to a Lower Establishment in January 1942. The division was disbanded and broken up on 14 December 1943. Its component units would take part in the Normandy Campaign as support units, with the HQ Royal Artillery becoming HQ 8th Army Group Royal Artillery and HQ Royal Engineers becoming HQ Royal Engineers for the 6th Airborne Division. The divisional HQ was redesignated HQ Lines of Communication (54th Division) for the 21st Army Group. The division was not reformed in the post-war Territorial Army in 1947 but the 161st and 162nd Infantry Brigades both survived until disbandment in the 1960s.

== Postwar ==
The formation became known as East Anglian District when the Territorial Army was reformed on 1 January 1947. In 1961 it became a district headquarters as 54th (East Anglian) Division/District, and it was disbanded on the reduction of the TA into the Territorial and Army Volunteer Reserve on 1 April 1967, when many individual TA units lost their identities. The district headquarters itself formed the core of the structure for the creation of Eastern District under HQ UK Land Forces in 1972.

== General officers commanding ==
General Officers Commanding have included:

Appointed	General officer commanding
August 1908	Brigadier-General John H. Campbell
October 1910	Major-General the Hon. Julian H.G. Byng
October 1912	Major-General Charles V.F. Townshend
7 June 1913	Major-General Francis S. Inglefield (sick)
6 October 1915	Brigadier-General F.F.W. Daniell (acting)
11 October 1915	Major-General Francis S. Inglefield (sick)
14 October 1915	Brigadier-General Henry Hodgson (acting)
13 November 1915	Major-General Francis S. Inglefield
27 April 1916	Major-General Sir Steuart W. Hare (sick)
31 March 1917	Brigadier-General Henry George Sandilands (acting)
12 April 1917	Major-General Sir Steuart Hare (leave)
4 January 1918	Brigadier-General Davison Bruce Stewart (acting)
16 March 1918	Major-General Sir Steuart Hare
July 1923	Major-General John Duncan
February 1927	Major-General Sir Torquhil G. Matheson
September 1930	Major-General Francis J. Marshall
September 1934	Major-General Russell M. Luckock
September 1938	Major-General John H.T. Priestman
February 1941	Major-General Evelyn H. Barker
April 1943	Major-General Charles B. Wainwright
May 1943	Major-General Colin B. Callander
1946	Major-General Cyril E.N. Lomax
March 1948	Major-General Maurice S. Chilton
April 1950	Major-General Charles E.A. Firth
January 1951	Major-General Hugh C. Stockwell
May 1951	Major-General Leslie K. Lockhart
December 1952	Major-General Roger H. Bower
May 1955	Major-General Reginald P. Harding
June 1958	Major-General Dennis E.B. Talbot
March 1961	Major-General Ian H. Freeland
July 1963	Major-General Richard A. Fyffe
May 1965	Major-General Fergus A.H. Ling

== Orders of battle ==
=== 1910 ===
East Anglian Division (1910)

- Norfolk and Suffolk Brigade
  - 4th Battalion, Norfolk Regiment
  - 5th Battalion, Norfolk Regiment
  - 4th Battalion, Suffolk Regiment
  - 5th Battalion, Suffolk Regiment
- East Midland Brigade
  - 5th Battalion, Bedfordshire Regiment
  - 4th Battalion, Northamptonshire Regiment
  - 1st Battalion, Cambridgeshire Regiment
  - 1st Battalion, Hertfordshire Regiment
- Essex Brigade
  - 4th Battalion, Essex Regiment
  - 5th Battalion, Essex Regiment
  - 6th Battalion, Essex Regiment
  - 7th Battalion, Essex Regiment
- Divisional Artillery
  - 1st East Anglian Brigade, Royal Field Artillery (RFA)
    - 1st Norfolk Battery
    - 2nd Norfolk Battery
    - 3rd Norfolk Battery
    - 1st East Anglian Ammunition Column
  - 2nd East Anglian Brigade, RFA
    - 1st Essex Battery
    - 2nd Essex Battery
    - 3rd Essex Battery
    - 2nd East Anglian Ammunition Column
  - 3rd East Anglian (Howitzer) Brigade, RFA
    - 1st Suffolk Battery
    - 2nd Suffolk Battery
    - 3rd East Anglian Ammunition Column
  - 4th East Anglian Brigade, RFA
    - 1st Hertfordshire Battery
    - 2nd Hertfordshire Battery
    - Northamptonshire Battery
    - 4th East Anglian Ammunition Column
  - East Anglian (Essex) Heavy Battery, Royal Garrison Artillery
- Divisional Engineers
  - 1st East Anglian Field Company, Royal Engineers (RE)
  - 2nd East Anglian Field Company, RE
  - East Anglian Divisional Telegraph Company, RE
- Army Service Corps
  - East Anglian Transport and Supply Column
- Royal Army Medical Corps
  - 1st East Anglian Field Ambulance
  - 2nd East Anglian Field Ambulance
  - 3rd East Anglian Field Ambulance

=== First World War ===
54th (East Anglian) Division (1914–1918)

- 161st (Essex) Brigade
  - 1/4th Battalion, Essex Regiment
  - 1/5th Battalion, Essex Regiment
  - 1/6th Battalion, Essex Regiment
  - 1/7th Battalion, Essex Regiment
  - 161st Machine Gun Company, Machine Gun Corps (formed 23 April 1916, moved to 54th Battalion, Machine Gun Corps 19 April 1918)
  - 161st Trench Mortar Battery (formed by 17 May 1917)
- 162nd (East Midland) Brigade
  - 1/5th Battalion, Bedfordshire Regiment
  - 1/4th Battalion, Northamptonshire Regiment
  - 1/1st Battalion, Cambridgeshire Regiment (to France, February 1915)
  - 1/1st Battalion, Hertfordshire Regiment (to France, November 1914)
  - 2/1st Battalion, Cambridgeshire Regiment (joined February 1915 from 2nd East Anglian Division to replace 1/1st Cambridgeshires, returned to 2nd East Anglian Division in April of that year)
  - 1/10th (County of London) Battalion, London Regiment (Hackney) (from April 1915)
  - 1/11th (County of London) Battalion, London Regiment (Finsbury Rifles) (from April 1915)
  - 162nd Machine Gun Company, Machine Gun Company (formed 26 April 1916, moved to 54th Battalion, Machine Gun Corps 19 April 1918)
  - 162nd Trench Mortar Battery (formed by 5 May 1917)
- 163rd (Norfolk and Suffolk) Brigade
  - 1/4th Battalion, Norfolk Regiment
  - 1/5th Battalion, Norfolk Regiment
  - 1/4th Battalion, Suffolk Regiment (to France, November 1914)
  - 1/5th Battalion, Suffolk Regiment
  - 1/8th (Isle of Wight Rifles, Princess Beatrice's) Battalion, Hampshire Regiment (from 19 April 1915)
  - 163rd Machine Gun Company, Machine Gun Corps (formed 1 May 1916, moved to 54th Battalion, Machine Gun Corps 19 April 1918)
  - 163rd Trench Mortar Battery (formed by 4 May 1917)
- 54th (East Anglian) Divisional Artillery (Note: The divisional artillery did not accompany the division to Gallipoli. On 17 November 1915 it embarked for France, where it was attached to the 33rd Division, a 'Kitchener's Army' division whose artillery were still under training. It rejoined 54th Division in Egypt in February 1916.)
- 1/I East Anglian Brigade, RFA (numbered CCLXX Brigade on 26 May 1916 and CCLXXII Brigade on 21 December 1916)
  - 1/1st Norfolk Battery (became A Battery on 26 May 1916)
  - 1/2nd Norfolk Battery (became B Battery on 26 May 1916)
  - 1/3rd Norfolk Battery (became C Battery on 26 May 1916, broken up between A and B Batteries on 21 December 1916)
  - 1/I East Anglian Brigade Ammunition Column
- 1/II East Anglian Brigade, RFA (numbered CCLXXI Brigade on 26 May 1916)
  - 1/1st Essex Battery (became A Battery on 26 May 1916)
  - 1/2nd Essex Battery (became B Battery on 26 May 1916)
  - 1/3rd Essex Battery (became C Battery on 26 May 1916, broken up between A and B Batteries on 20 December 1916)
  - C (Howitzer) Battery (joined 20 December 1916 from CCLXXII (H) Brigade)
  - 1/II East Anglian Brigade Ammunition Column
- 1/III East Anglian Brigade (Howitzers) (numbered CCLXXII (H) Brigade on 28 May 1916, broken up 21 December 1916)
  - 1/1st Suffolk Battery (Howitzers) (became A (Howitzer) Battery 28 May 1916, to CCLXXI Brigade 21 December 1916)
  - 1/2nd Suffolk Battery (Howitzers) (became B (Howitzer) Battery 28 May 1916, to CCLXX Brigade 21 December 1916)
  - 1/III East Anglian Brigade Ammunition Column
- 1/IV East Anglian Brigade, RFA (numbered CCLXXIII Brigade on 29 May 1916 and CCLXX Brigade on 21 December 1916)
  - 1/1st Hertfordshire Battery (became A Battery on 29 May 1916)
  - 1/2nd Hertfordshire Battery (became B Battery on 29 May 1916, broken up between A and C Batteries on 21 December 1916)
  - 1/1st Northamptonshire Battery (became C Battery on 29 May 1916, became B Battery on 21 December 1916)
  - C (Howitzer) Battery (joined 21 December 1916 from CCLXXII (H) Brigade)
  - 1/IV East Anglian Brigade Ammunition Column
- 1/1st East Anglian (Essex) Heavy Battery, RGA (left in England when division went to Gallipoli; later served in France)
- 54th (East Anglian) Divisional Ammunition Column (detachment accompanied division to Gallipoli, while the remainder were sent to France in November 1915, where they became the 55th (West Lancashire) Divisional Ammunition Column January 1916)

Divisional artillery after August 1916 reorganisation:

- CCLXX Brigade, RFA
  - A, B, C (H) Batteries
- CCLXXI Brigade, RFA
  - A, B, 440 (H) Batteries
- CCLXXIII Brigade, RFA
  - A, B, C (H) Batteries
- Trench Mortars (joined on 3 October 1917, left 2 March 1918)
  - X.54 Medium Trench Mortar Battery
  - Y.54 Medium Trench Mortar Battery
  - Z.54 Medium Trench Mortar Battery
- Divisional Engineers
  - 1/1st East Anglian Field Company, RE (joined 2nd Division in France on 5 January 1915)
  - /2nd East Anglian Field Company, RE (renumbered 484th Field Company on 1 February 1917)
  - 2/1st East Anglian Field Company (formed after mobilisation; renumbered 485th Field Company on 1 February 1917), RE
  - 1st Kent Fortress Field Company, RE (joined 1 July 1916; renumbered 495th (1st Kent) Field Company on 1 February 1917)
  - 54th (East Anglian) Divisional Signal Company, RE
- Royal Army Medical Corps
  - 1st East Anglian Field Ambulance (joined 29th Division in January 1915)
  - 2nd East Anglian Field Ambulance
  - 3rd East Anglian Field Ambulance
  - 2/1st East Anglian Field Ambulance (formed after mobilisation)

=== Second World War ===
54th (East Anglian) Infantry Division (Second World War)

- 161st Infantry Brigade (until 17 December 1940)
  - 1/4th Battalion, Essex Regiment (left 20 July 1940)
  - 1/5th Battalion, Essex Regiment (until 14 December 1940)
  - 2/4th Battalion, Essex Regiment (left 18 September 1939)
  - 2/5th Battalion, Essex Regiment
  - 5th (Hackney) Battalion, Royal Berkshire Regiment (left 18 September 1939)
  - 7th (Hackney) Battalion, Royal Berkshire Regiment (left 18 September 1939)
  - 161st Infantry Brigade Anti-Tank Company (formed 10 July 1940)
- 162nd Infantry Brigade (until 10 November 1942 and from 5 September 1943)
  - 6th Battalion, Bedfordshire and Hertfordshire Regiment
  - 1st Battalion, Hertfordshire Regiment (to September 1942)
  - 2nd Battalion, Hertfordshire Regiment (to September 1942)
  - 162nd Infantry Brigade Anti-Tank Company (formed 1 February 1940, disbanded 14 July 1941)
- 163rd Infantry Brigade (redesignated 53rd Infantry Brigade 18 September 1939)
  - 5th Battalion, Royal Norfolk Regiment (until 17 September 1939)
  - 6th Battalion, Royal Norfolk Regiment (until 17 September 1939)
  - 7th Battalion, Royal Norfolk Regiment (until 17 September 1939)
  - 2/4th Battalion, Essex Regiment (from 18 September 1939 until 11 April 1943)
  - 5th (Hackney) Battalion, Royal Berkshire Regiment (from 18 September 1939 until 1 November 1943)
  - 7th (Hackney) Battalion, Royal Berkshire Regiment (from 18 September 1939, disbanded 10 October 1942)
  - 163rd Infantry Brigade Anti-Tank Company (formed 1 February 1940, disbanded 14 July 1941)
  - 6th Battalion, King's Own Royal Regiment (Lancaster) (from 16 October until 11 December 1942)
  - 1st Buckinghamshire Battalion, Oxfordshire and Buckinghamshire Light Infantry (from 12 December 1942 until 30 May 1943)
  - 5th Battalion, King's Regiment (Liverpool) (from 18 July 1943 until 1 November 1943)
- 198th Infantry Brigade (from 20 December 1940)
  - 8th (Irish) Battalion, King's Regiment (Liverpool)
  - 6th Battalion, Border Regiment
  - 7th Battalion, Border Regiment (until 9 December 1942)
  - 198th Infantry Brigade Anti-Tank Company (formed 30 July 1940, disbanded 14 July 1941)
  - 2nd Battalion, Hertfordshire Regiment (from 9 December 1942)

Divisional troops

- HQ 54th Divisional Artillery, Royal Artillery (became 8th Army Group Royal Artillery 1 May 1943)
  - 85th (East Anglian) Field Regiment (to 24 August 1942)
  - 86th (East Anglian) (Hertfordshire Yeomanry) Field Regiment (to 9 June 1942)
  - 134th Field Regiment (to 10 February 1942)
  - 168th Field Regiment (from 9 June 1942 to 9 June 1943)
  - 55th (Suffolk Yeomanry) Anti-Tank Regiment (to 21 February 1943)
  - 19th Light Anti-Aircraft Regiment (from 21 April 1942 to 9 September 1942) (Note: Note typo: 19th not 199th)
- HQ 54th Divisional Engineers, Royal Engineers (to 6th Airborne Division 20 May 1943)
  - 248th (East Anglian) Field Company (to 16 September 1939)
  - 249th (East Anglian) Field Company (to 6th Airborne Division 20 May 1943)
  - 286th Field Company (to 20 May 1943)
  - 289th Field Park Company (to 2 March 1942)
  - 250th Field Company (from September, to 42nd Divisional Engineers 20 October 1939)
  - 556th Field Company (from 4 January 1940 to 29 December 1941)
  - 591st (Antrim) Field Company (from 1 January 1942, to 6th Airborne Division 20 May 1943)
- 54th (East Anglian) Divisional Signals, Royal Corps of Signals
- 54th Battalion, Reconnaissance Corps (formed 15 July 1941 from 21st Battalion, Royal Fusiliers; reduced to 54th Independent Reconnaissance Company 1 January 1942; 54th Independent Reconnaissance Squadron 6 June 1942; to 15th (Scottish) Infantry Division 9 February 1943)

== See also ==
- List of British divisions in World War I
- List of British divisions in World War II
- British Army Order of Battle (September 1939)
- Independent Company
