= Charles Loewen =

British Army general

General Sir Charles Loewen GCB KBE DSO
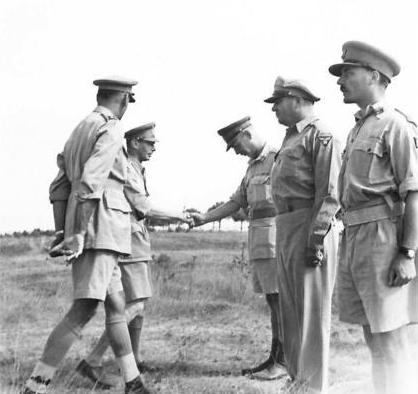
- Major-General Loewen greeting King George VI in 1944
- Born: 17 September 1900; Vancouver, British Columbia, Canada
- Died: 17 August 1986 (aged 85); London, England
- Spouse: Kathleen Gordon Ross (m. 1928)
- Military career
- Allegiance: United Kingdom
- Branch: British Army
- Service years: 1916–1959
- Rank: General
- Service number: 17987
- Unit: Royal Artillery
- Commands: Far East Land Forces (1953–1956); Western Command (1953); Anti-Aircraft Command (1950–1953); 50th (Northumbrian) Infantry Division (1948–1950); 1st Armoured Division (1947); 6th Armoured Division (1946); 1st Infantry Division (1944–1946)
- Conflicts: First World War; Second World War; Palestine Emergency
- Awards: Knight Grand Cross of the Order of the Bath; Knight Commander of the Order of the British Empire; Companion of the Distinguished Service Order; Mentioned in Despatches; Commander of the Legion of Merit (United States)

General Sir Charles Falkland Loewen, GCB, KBE, DSO (17 September 1900 – 17 August 1986) was a Canadian-born British Army officer who served as Adjutant-General to the Forces from 1956 to 1959.

== Early life and military career ==
Educated at the Royal Military College of Canada in Kingston, Ontario, where he enrolled in 1916, Charles Loewen joined the British Army in 1918. He was commissioned as a second lieutenant into the Royal Field Artillery during the close of the First World War as he was too young for active service with the Canadian Army. He was promoted to lieutenant on 17 March 1920, and to captain on 17 September 1931.

Loewen was a student at the Staff College, Quetta in 1933 and was promoted to brevet major on 2 July 1937. Promoted to major the following year, he served in British India with the local rank of lieutenant colonel (from 1 November 1938). Loewen was promoted to brevet lieutenant colonel on 1 July 1939. That same year saw the outbreak of the Second World War, at which time Loewen was serving in England as an instructor at the Staff College, Camberley.

== Second World War ==
Promoted to war substantive lieutenant colonel in 1941, in the Second World War Loewen served as Commander, Royal Artillery (CRA) in the 55th (West Lancashire) Infantry Division, then 6th Infantry Division, then 1st Infantry Division and finally I Corps. He saw active service during the Norwegian campaign and took part in planning in the War Office. He was promoted to colonel on 30 June 1943 (seniority from 1 July 1942). In 1943, he drafted Operation Skyscraper to occur on the beaches of Normandy. The plan was shelved as it was thought to need too many resources. It was re-used and re-expanded in Operation Overlord back to the original ten divisions – which Skyscraper had recommended in the first place.

Loewen was also involved in the Italian campaign, where he later served as General Officer Commanding (GOC) of the 1st Infantry Division from July 1944. As a temporary brigadier by 1944, he was appointed a Commander of the Order of the British Empire in the 1944 New Year Honours. He was promoted to the acting rank of major general on 24 July 1944, appointed a Companion of the Distinguished Service Order for distinguished service in Italy on 28 June 1945, appointed a Companion of the Order of the Bath on 5 July, and Mentioned in Despatches on 19 July. He was promoted to temporary major general on 24 July.

== Postwar and retirement ==
After the war, Loewen was promoted to the permanent rank of major general on 6 May 1946 (seniority from 30 August 1944). He took a number of commands including the 6th Armoured Division in 1946, which was later redesignated the 1st Armoured Division and which he led throughout the Palestine Emergency and, returning to England, the 50th (Northumbrian) Infantry Division and Northumbrian District in 1948. He was awarded the United States Legion of Merit in the degree of Commander on 14 May 1948. He was appointed General Officer Commanding-in-Chief (GOC-in-C) of Anti-Aircraft Command on 27 May 1950, with a promotion to lieutenant general from the same date. Knighted as a Knight Commander of the Order of the British Empire in the 1951 King's Birthday Honours, he was appointed GOC-in-C of Western Command on 23 April 1953.

Loewen became Commander-in-Chief (C-in-C) Far East Land Forces on 13 October 1953. Appointed a Knight Commander of the Order of the Bath in the 1954 New Year Honours, following his promotion to general on 16 April, he went on to be Adjutant-General to the Forces in 1956. He retired from the British Army in 1959. Loewen was Aide-de-Camp General to the Queen from 1956 to 1959.

Loewen moved with his wife to be with his sons, Charles Bernard Loewen and John Falkland Loewen, and retired at The Boyne River Mill near to Mansfield. He was the author of a book entitled Fly fishing flies.

His two-volume memoirs were self-published in 1986.

== Honours and legacy ==
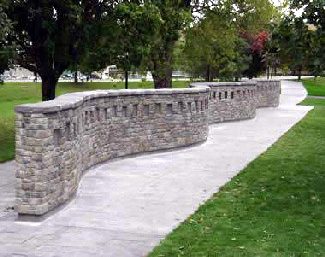
Wall of Honour, Royal Military College of Canada

Loewen, a graduate of the Royal Military College of Canada, is listed on the Wall of Honour in Kingston, Ontario.

== Bibliography ==
- Blaxland, Gregory (1979). Alexander's Generals (the Italian Campaign 1944–1945). London: William Kimber & Co. ISBN 0-7183-0386-5.
- Smart, Nick (2005). Biographical Dictionary of British Generals of the Second World War. Barnsley, South Yorkshire: Pen and Sword Books. ISBN 1844150496.
- 4237 Dr. Adrian Preston & Peter Dennis (Edited) "Swords and Covenants" Rowman And Littlefield, London. Croom Helm. 1976.
- H16511 Dr. Richard Arthur Preston "To Serve Canada: A History of the Royal Military College of Canada" 1997 Toronto, University of Toronto Press, 1969.
- H16511 Dr. Richard Arthur Preston "Canada's RMC – A History of Royal Military College" Second Edition 1982
- H1877 R. Guy C. Smith (editor) "As You Were! Ex-Cadets Remember". In 2 Volumes. Volume I: 1876–1918. Volume II: 1919–1984. Royal Military College. [Kingston]. The R.M.C. Club of Canada. 1984

Military offices
Preceded by Ronald Penney	GOC 1st Infantry Division; 1944–1946	Succeeded by Richard Gale
Preceded by John Whitfield	GOC 50th (Northumbrian) Infantry Division; 1948–1950	Succeeded by Lashmer Whistler
Preceded by Sir Ivor Thomas	GOC-in-C Anti-Aircraft Command; 1950–1953	Succeeded by Maurice Chilton
Preceded by Sir Cameron Nicholson	GOC-in-C Western Command; 1953	Succeeded by Sir Lashmer Whistler
Preceded by Sir Charles Keightley	C-in-C Far East Land Forces; 1953–1956	Succeeded by Sir Francis Festing
Preceded by Sir Cameron Nicholson	Adjutant General; 1956–1959	Succeeded by Sir Hugh Stockwell
