= Nickforce =

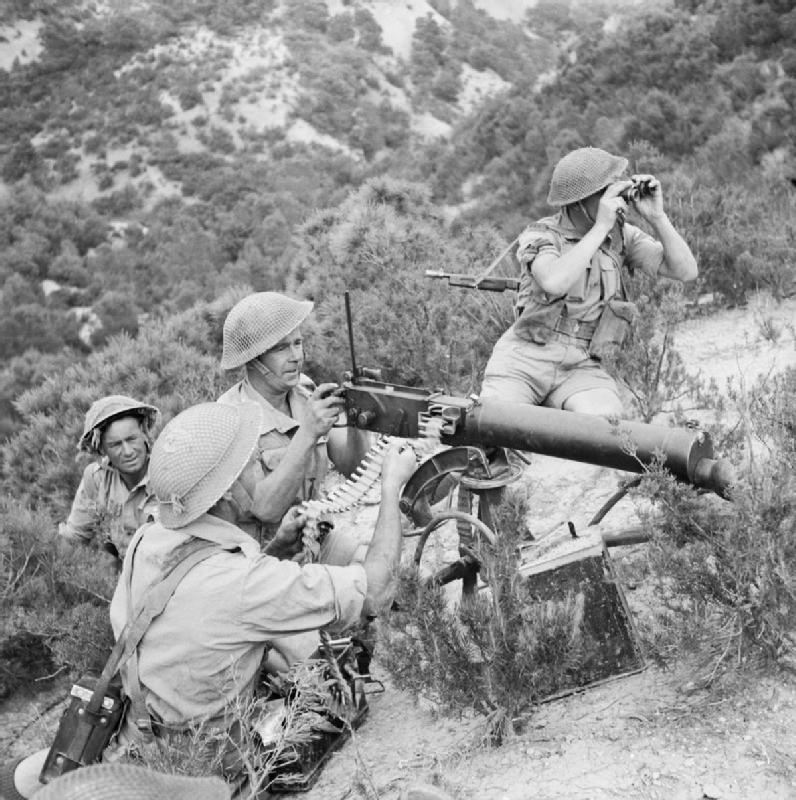
A Vickers machine gun team of the 10th Battalion, Rifle Brigade, training in Tunisia in 1943.

Nickforce was an improvised formation of the British First Army in the Tunisian campaign of the Second World War. It was hastily formed from elements of the British 6th Armoured Division on 14 February 1943, for the defence of Thala, during the latter stages of the Battle of Kasserine Pass. It took its name from the commanding officer, Brigadier Cameron Nicholson. In desperate fighting, the force successfully blocked a Kampfgruppe of the 10th Panzer Division, under the direct control of Generalfeldmarschall Erwin Rommel, on 21 and 22 February.

== Order of battle ==
On 14 February 1943

- 17th/21st Lancers
- 2nd Lothians and Border Horse
- 10th Battalion, Rifle Brigade (The Prince Consort's Own)
- 1 Troop, "F" Battery 12th (Honourable Artillery Company) Regiment Royal Horse Artillery
- 1 Troop, 450th Battery 71st (West Riding) Field Regiment, Royal Artillery

Units subsequently attached:

- 2nd/5th Battalion, Leicestershire Regiment
- 90 Battery, 23rd Field Regiment, Royal Artillery
- 229 Battery, 58th (Duke of Wellingtons) Anti-Tank Regiment, Royal Artillery
- All of "F" Battery 12th (HAC) Regiment, Royal Horse Artillery
- 4.2" Mortar Company, Royal Artillery
