= 308th Infantry Brigade =

- Active: Formed 22 January 1945
- Country: United Kingdom
- Branch: British Army
- Type: Infantry Brigade
- Role: Lines of Communication

308th Infantry Brigade (308 Bde) was a formation of the British Army organised from surplus Royal Artillery (RA) personnel retrained as infantry towards the end of the Second World War.

== Origin ==
By the end of 1944, 21st Army Group was suffering a severe manpower shortage, particularly among the infantry. In January 1945, the War Office began to reorganise surplus anti-aircraft and coastal artillery regiments in the UK into infantry battalions, primarily for line of communication and occupation duties in North West Europe, thereby releasing trained infantry for frontline service. 308th was the last of seven brigades formed from these new units.

== Composition ==
308th Infantry Brigade was formed on 22 January 1945 by conversion of Headquarters 61st Anti-Aircraft Brigade within 4 Anti-Aircraft Group. It was commanded by Brigadier R.R.B. Hilton and comprised the following Territorial Army RA units:

- 627th Infantry Regiment Royal Artillery formed by 98th Light Anti-Aircraft Regiment RA (TA).
- 629th Infantry Regiment Royal Artillery formed by 135th Light Anti-Aircraft Regiment RA (TA).
- 633rd (Queen's Own Royal West Kent) Infantry Regiment Royal Artillery formed by the 34th (Queen's Own Royal West Kent) Searchlight Regiment RA (TA), itself formed from the 20th Battalion, London Regiment (Blackheath and Woolwich) in 1935.

== Service ==
After infantry training, including a short period attached to 38th Infantry (Reserve) Division, 308 Bde came under the orders of 21st Army Group on 27 April 1945 and landed on the Continent two days later. It came under the control of Maasforce (4–22 May) and then I Canadian Corps.

== External sources ==
- Land Forces of Britain, The Empire and Commonwealth
- The Royal Artillery 1939–45
