= William Dimoline =

British Army general

Major-General William Dimoline CB CMG CBE DSO MC
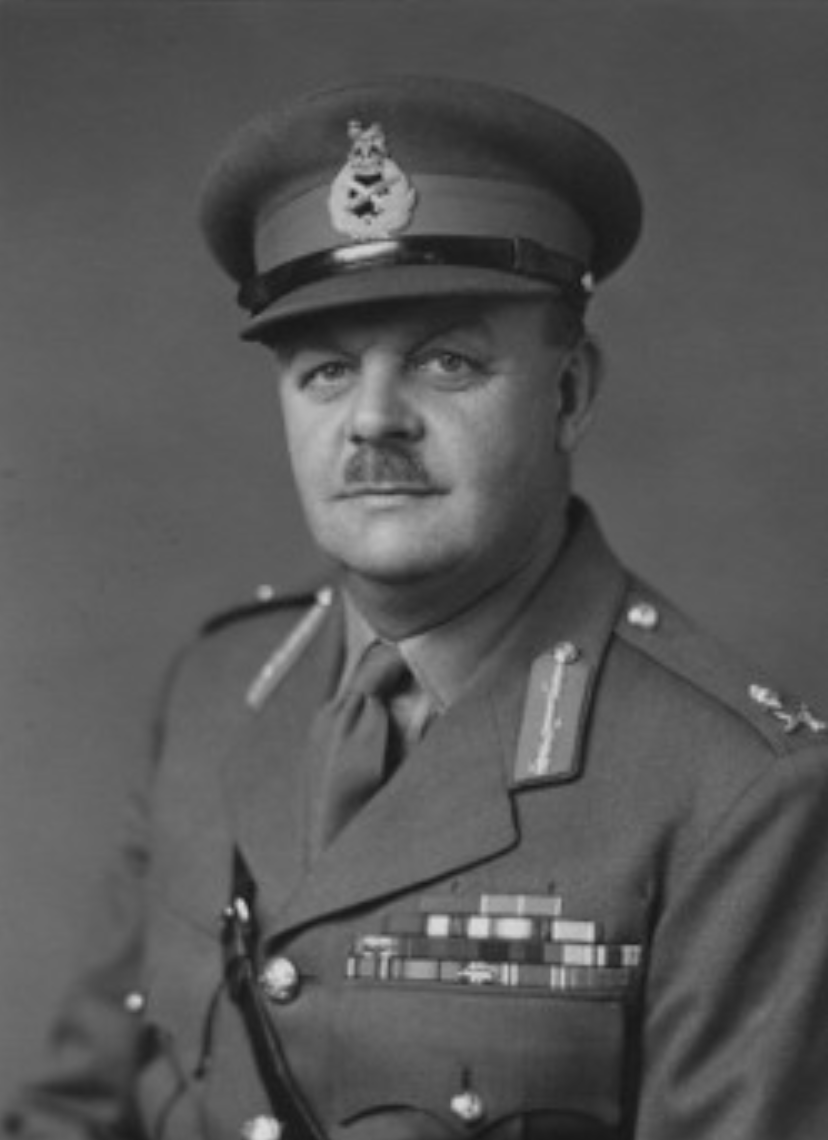
- Born: 6 July 1897; Wallasey, Cheshire, England
- Died: 24 November 1965 (aged 68); Westminster, London, England
- Military career
- Allegiance: United Kingdom
- Branch: British Army
- Service years: 1914–1953
- Rank: Major-General
- Nickname: "Dimmy"
- Service number: 12284
- Units: King's Regiment (Liverpool); East Surrey Regiment; Royal Signal Corps
- Commands: Aldershot District (1948–1951); East Africa Command (1946–1948); 11th (East Africa) Division (1945–1946); 28th (East Africa) Infantry Brigade (1944–1945); 30th (East Africa) Infantry Brigade (1944); 21st (East Africa) Infantry Brigade (1943); 22nd (East Africa) Infantry Brigade (1942–1943); 26th (East Africa) Infantry Brigade (1941–1942); Northern Rhodesia Regiment (1937–1939)
- Conflicts: First World War; Second World War
- Awards: Companion of the Order of the Bath; Companion of the Order of St Michael and St George; Commander of the Order of the British Empire; Distinguished Service Order; Military Cross; Mentioned in Despatches

Major-General William Alfred Dimoline, CB, CMG, CBE, DSO, MC (6 July 1897 – 24 November 1965) was a senior British Army officer who saw service during the First and Second World Wars. His nickname was "Dimmy."

== Early career ==
Dimoline was educated at Dean Close School, Cheltenham, where he was a member of the Officer Training Corps. Following the outbreak of the First World War, he was commissioned into the King's Regiment (Liverpool) (Territorial Force) as a second lieutenant in 1914. He was promoted to lieutenant in 1915, seconded to the Divisional Artillery Signals on 15 March 1917, and promoted to captain. In 1920 he was given a backdated regular army commission in the East Surrey Regiment from July 1916, as a second lieutenant, having transferred to the regiment as a lieutenant in 1918. He was awarded the Military Cross in January 1918.

Between the world wars Dimoline transferred to the Royal Signal Corps. He commanded a Divisional Signal Company as an acting captain for a period up to 1922. He was then seconded to the West African Frontier Force as a temporary captain in 1923. In 1925 he was seconded to the Colonial Office, promoted to substantive captain in 1927 (with seniority back to 1920), and returned to regimental duty to serve as adjutant from 1930. He attended the Staff College, Camberley from 1933 to 1934, and in 1936 was appointed a General Staff Officer Grade 3, holding the appointment until January 1937. He was appointed Commandant of the Northern Rhodesia Regiment, with the local rank of lieutenant colonel, and appointed to the Northern Rhodesia Legislative Council. He was promoted to substantive lieutenant colonel on 8 November 1938.

== Second World War ==
Dimoline was employed in the Middle East during the early stages of the Second World War, and was appointed an Officer of the Order of the British Empire in 1941 for his services there. He was promoted to substantive colonel on 19 December that year, and Mentioned in Despatches.

Brigadier Dimoline commanded the 26th (East Africa) Infantry Brigade (of the 12th (African) Division) in Italian Somaliland and Ethiopia during the East African Campaign. His brigade acted independently of its division for the duration of the campaign.

During the Battle of Madagascar in 1942, Dimoline commanded the 22nd (East Africa) Infantry Brigade. His brigade carried out an amphibious landing on 10 September at Majunga, in the north-west part of the island. He commanded a surprise attack on 18 October against forces based at Andriamanalina with such success that his troops suffered no casualties. He was appointed a Commander of the Order of the British Empire for his part in the battle.

Later, Dimoline commanded a number of east African brigades during the Burma campaign. He was promoted to acting major general in 1945, and appointed General Officer Commanding the 11th (East Africa) Division. He was again Mentioned in Despatches for his performance in Burma, and awarded the Distinguished Service Order.

== Post war ==
Dimoline was made a substantive major general on 6 September 1946, and was appointed General Officer Commanding East Africa Command. He was made a Companion of the Order of the Bath in the 1947 Birthday Honours and, in 1948, was appointed General Officer Commanding Aldershot District; he relinquished command of the Aldershot District on 1 September 1951. On 29 September, he was appointed "Head of The Service Advisers to The United Kingdom Delegation and United Kingdom Representative on, The Military Staff Committee of The United Nations", and held the post until 13 October 1953. He retired on 27 December 1953, remaining a reserve officer until 1957. He was appointed a Companion of the Order of St Michael and St George in the 1958 New Year Honours for his work as "Secretary, British Group, Inter-Parliamentary Union."

== Family ==
Dimoline's younger brother was Brigadier Harry Dimoline. His wife was Irene Muriel Dimoline, and he had three daughters.

== Bibliography ==
- Mead, Richard (2007). Churchill's Lions: a biographical guide to the key British generals of World War II. Stroud (UK): Spellmount. ISBN 978-1-86227-431-0.
- Smart, Nick (2005). Biographical Dictionary of British Generals of the Second World War. Barnsley, South Yorkshire: Pen and Sword Books. ISBN 1844150496.

Military offices
Preceded by Sir Kenneth Anderson	GOC East Africa Command; 1946–1948	Succeeded by Sir Arthur Dowler
Preceded by Joseph Baillon	GOC Aldershot District; 1948–1951	Succeeded by Sir John Eldridge
