= Francis Arkwright (cricketer) =

English cricketer

Personal information
- Full name: Francis Godfrey Bertram Arkwright
- Born: 30 January 1905; Bromley, Kent, England
- Died: 1 July 1942 (aged 37); Acroma, Italian Libya
- Batting: Right-handed

Domestic team information
- Years: Team
- 1923: Hampshire

Career statistics
Competition	First-class
Matches	4
Runs scored	67
Batting average	9.57
100s/50s	–/–
Top score	23
Catches/stumpings	2/–
- Source: Cricinfo, 23 December 2009

Francis Godfrey Bertram Arkwright DSO MC (30 January 1905 – 1 July 1942) was an English first-class cricketer and British Army officer. After a brief first-class cricket career, he served with the 12th Lancers for nearly twenty years, prior to his death during the Second World War.

== Cricket and military career ==
The son of Bertram Harry Godfrey Arkwright (1879–1949) and his wife, Grace Emma Julia Arkwright (née Hurt) (c.1875–1950), he was born at Bromley in January 1905. He was educated at Eton College, where he played for the cricket eleven. In his second year, he shared in a partnership of 301 for the second wicket with Eddie Dawson against Winchester College, which was a record partnership for the fixture. In 1923, he led the Eton batting averages with an average of 52.44. He was noted by Wisden whilst at Eton as being a "brilliant stylish batsman" who used his "fine physique in front of the wicket forcing strokes, besides the powerful drive". In the same year that he led the Eton averages, Arkwright made three first-class appearances for Hampshire in the County Championship, playing twice against Lancashire and once against Yorkshire. However, he was unable to repeat his Eton success at first-class level, scoring just 44 runs in his three matches, with a highest score of 14. After completing his education at Eton, Arkwright pursued a career in the British Army. He graduated from the Royal Military College at Sandhurst (RMC) into the 12th Lancers as a second lieutenant in January 1925. In the same year that he graduated from the RMC, Arkwright made a single first-class appearance for the British Army cricket team against Cambridge University at Fenner's.

Arkwright was promoted to lieutenant in January 1927, prior to his secondment to the Sudan Defence Force (SDF) in June 1932. While with the SDF, he held the rank of bimbashi (the equivalent of captain) and commanded No. 1 Motor Machine Gun Company. During the early months of 1934, Arkwright notably occupied Ain Murr in the remote Jebel Uweinat during the Sarra Dispute with Italy, which was the occupying power in neighbouring Libya. Upon his return to England in July 1934, he was restored to the 12th Lancers as an adjutant with the rank of captain.

He went up to the British Army Staff College at Camberley, Surrey in September 1939, when the Second World War began. After graduating, he was sent to France as a staff officer and saw action in the Battle of France in May and June 1940, where he was made a brigade major and placed in charge of a tank formation. For his actions during the campaign, he was awarded the Military Cross in October 1940. After returning to England, he was sent to North Africa in 1941. In January 1942, he was promoted to major, whilst in May 1942 he was placed in command of the 4th County of London Yeomanry. Arkwright was killed in action on 1 July 1942, at Acroma in Italian Libya, having been struck by an armour piercing round; he was later commemorated on the Alamein Memorial. He was posthumously made a Companion of the Distinguished Service Order in August 1942.

Arkwright was survived by his wife, Joyce. His elder brother was Robert Arkwright, who commanded the 2nd Infantry Division during the Second World War. His grandfather was the Reverend William Harry Arkwright, the older brother of the politician Francis Arkwright (1846–1915).
