= John Yeldham Whitfield =

British Army officer

Major-General John Yeldham Whitfield CB DSO* OBE
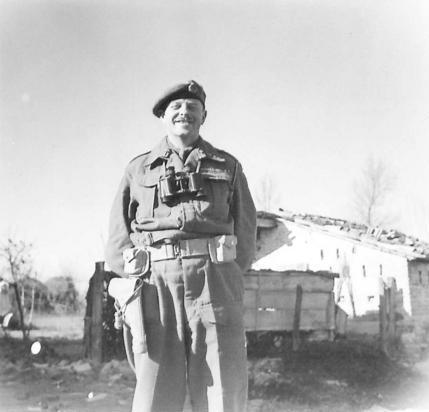
- Whitfield during the Second World War
- Born: 11 October 1899; Leamington Spa, Warwickshire, England
- Died: 23 September 1971 (aged 71)
- Military career
- Allegiance: United Kingdom
- Branch: British Army
- Service years: 1918–1955
- Rank: Major-General
- Service number: 26601
- Unit: Queen's Royal Regiment
- Commands: 2/5th Battalion, Queen's Royal Regiment; 15th Infantry Brigade; 56th (London) Infantry Division; 50th (Northumbrian) Infantry Division
- Conflicts: Second World War
- Awards: Companion of the Order of the Bath (United States); Order of the Red Star (USSR)

Major-General John Yeldham Whitfield, CB, DSO & Bar, OBE (11 October 1899 – 23 September 1971) was a senior British Army officer who commanded the 56th (London) Infantry Division during the Italian Campaign of the Second World War and later the 50th (Northumbrian) Infantry Division.

== Military career ==
Educated at Monmouth School and the Royal Military College, Sandhurst, Whitfield was commissioned as a second lieutenant into the Queen's Royal Regiment, British Army, on 20 December 1918.

Unable to see service in the First World War, he continued to serve in the army during the interwar period, where he remained in both East and West Africa for many years, serving with the Royal West African Frontier Force. Returning to England, he attended the Staff College, Camberley from 1934 to 1935, married in 1936, and was a brigade major with the King's African Rifles from 1937 to 1939.

He returned to England in 1942 during the Second World War, where he became commanding officer (CO) of the 2/5th Battalion, Queen's Royal Regiment in July, leading the battalion in Iraq, Palestine, Egypt and Libya and in the final stages of the Tunisian campaign in late April 1943.

Whitfield was awarded the Distinguished Service Order (DSO), "in recognition of gallant and distinguished services in the Middle East", on 19 August. He then led the battalion in many battles in the Italian Campaign, including in the Allied invasion of Italy in September, followed by the capture of Naples, the crossing of the Volturno Line, both in October, and, fighting in front of the Bernhardt Line, part of the Winter Line, the Battle for Monte la Difensa in December. He briefly commanded the 169th (Queens) Infantry Brigade, his battalion's parent formation, in October and November 1943. In January 1944 he took command of the 15th Infantry Brigade, commanding the brigade in the First Battle of Monte Cassino, later taking part in the Battle of Anzio. He briefly served as a brigadier on the General Staff of V Corps. In July he became the general officer commanding (GOC) 56th (London) Infantry Division, rising from battalion to divisional command in the space of just six months. He led the division in the attack on the Gothic Line in the latter half of 1944 and the offensive in Italy in April 1945. He was appointed a Companion of the Order of the Bath in July 1945.

The 56th Division was deactivated in Austria after the war and Whitfield subsequently became GOC 50th (Northumbrian) Infantry Division and Northumbrian District in October 1946, chief of staff at Northern Command in January 1948 and Inspector of Recruiting at the War Office in 1951 before he finally retired from the army in 1955.

== Bibliography ==
- Smart, Nick (2005). Biographical Dictionary of British Generals of the Second World War. Barnsley, UK: Pen & Sword Military. ISBN 1-84415-049-6.

Military offices
Preceded by Gerald Templer	GOC 56th (London) Infantry Division; 1944–1946	Succeeded by Gerald Lloyd-Verney
Preceded by John Churcher	GOC 50th (Northumbrian) Infantry Division; 1946–1948	Succeeded by Charles Loewen
Honorary titles
Preceded by Sir George Giffard	Colonel of the 2nd (The Queen's Royal) Regiment of Foot; 1954–1959	Succeeded by Post disbanded
