= Charles Firth (British Army officer) =

British Army general (1902–1991)

Major-General Charles Firth CB CBE DSO
- Born: 1902
- Died: 13 October 1991 (aged 88–89)
- Military career
- Allegiance: United Kingdom
- Branch: British Army
- Service years: 1923–1956
- Rank: Major-General
- Service number: 24722
- Unit: Gloucestershire Regiment
- Commands: 1st Battalion, Royal Sussex Regiment; 167th Infantry Brigade; 21st Army Tank Brigade; 2nd Infantry Brigade; Berlin Infantry Brigade; East Anglian District
- Conflicts: Second World War
- Awards: Companion of the Order of the Bath; Commander of the Order of the British Empire; Distinguished Service Order

Major-General Charles Edward Anson Firth, CB, CBE, DSO (1902 – 13 October 1991) was a British Army officer.

== Early life ==
He was the son of Major Edward William Anson Firth of the 69th Punjabis, who died in 1906. He was educated at Wellington College and the Royal Military College, Sandhurst.

== Military career ==
Firth was commissioned into the Gloucestershire Regiment on 1 February 1923 and attended the Staff College, Camberley from 1936 to 1937. On 15 June 1938, towards the end of the interwar period, he was appointed a staff captain at the War Office in London.

After being promoted to major on 1 February 1940, he became commanding officer of the 1st Battalion Royal Sussex Regiment, in the Middle East in 1942 during the Second World War. He also served as commander of the 167th (1st London) Brigade in North Africa from June 1943, as commander of 21st Army Tank Brigade in North Africa and in Italy from February 1944 and as commander of 2nd Infantry Brigade from May 1944.

After the war he became deputy director of personal services at the War Office in February 1946, commander of the Berlin Infantry Brigade in February 1949 and general officer commanding East Anglian District in April 1950. He was promoted to substantive major general on 13 November 1950 and went on to be general officer commanding, Salisbury Plain District in May 1951 and director of personal services at the War Office in August 1953 before retiring in September 1956.

He served as Colonel of the Gloucestershire Regiment from 1954 to 1964.

Military offices
Preceded by Maurice Chilton	GOC East Anglian District; 1950–1951	Succeeded by Sir Hugh Stockwell
Honorary titles
Preceded by Sir Harry Wetherall	Colonel of the Gloucestershire Regiment; 1954–1964	Succeeded by Philip Heidenstam
