= Cameron Nicholson =

British Army General (1898–1979)

General Sir Cameron Nicholson GCB KBE DSO* MC*
- Nicholson in 1961
- Born: 30 June 1898
- Died: 7 July 1979 (aged 81); Cornwall, England
- Military career
- Allegiance: United Kingdom
- Branch: British Army
- Service years: 1915–1956
- Rank: General
- Nickname: "Cam"
- Service number: 13382
- Unit: Royal Artillery
- Commands: Middle East Land Forces (1953); Western Command (1951–1953); West Africa Command (1948–1951); 2nd Division (1944–1946); 5th Indian Infantry Division (1944); 21st Indian Infantry Division (1944); 44th Indian Armoured Division (1943–1944); Nickforce (1942–1943); 42nd Support Group (1941–1942); 127th (Manchester) Brigade (1941)
- Conflicts: First World War; Second World War; Mau Mau Uprising
- Awards: Knight Grand Cross of the Order of the Bath; Knight Commander of the Order of the British Empire; Companion of the Distinguished Service Order & Bar; Military Cross & Bar; Mentioned in Despatches; Silver Star (United States); Officer of the Legion of Merit (United States)

General Sir Cameron Gordon Graham Nicholson, GCB, KBE, DSO & Bar, MC & Bar (30 June 1898 – 7 July 1979) was a British Army officer who served as Adjutant-General to the Forces. He later served as Governor of the Royal Hospital Chelsea.

== Military career ==
After being educated at Wellington College, Berkshire and the Royal Military Academy, Woolwich, Cameron Nicholson was commissioned into the Royal Artillery in July 1915. He served in the First World War and was awarded Military Cross and Bar in 1918. The citation for his MC reads:

For conspicuous gallantry and devotion to duty while in charge of wagon lines and ammunition supply. He repeatedly brought up teams, and controlled their withdrawal, under heavy shell fire. He never let the guns be without ammunition.

Nicholson served with the Royal Horse Artillery in France, India, Iraq, Palestine and Egypt from 1917 to 1927. He served as an instructor at the Royal Military Academy, Woolwich from 1927 to 1930, attended the Staff College, Camberley from 1931 to 1932, and then worked as an instructor at the Staff College from 1938 to 1939. On 16 October 1936 he was appointed as a GSO3 at the War Office in London.

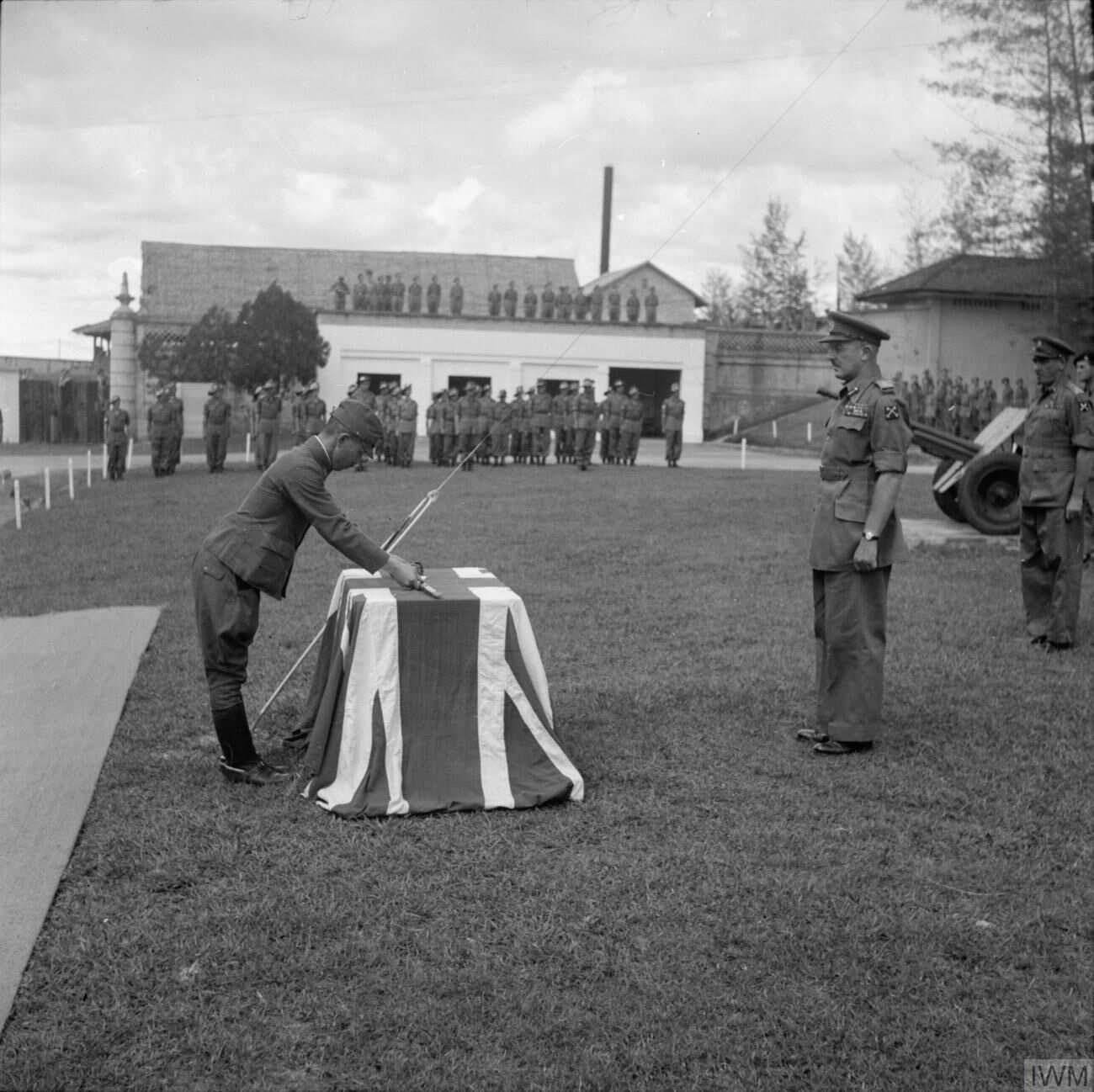
Captain Tomeichi Okazaki surrenders his sword to Major-General Cameron Nicholson in an official ceremony at Johor Bahru, Malaya, 1945.

He served in the Second World War and was appointed a Companion of the Distinguished Service Order with Bar in 1940. The beginning of the war in September 1939 found him still at the Staff College as an instructor, but this came to an end in February 1940, after which he was posted to the 45th Infantry Division, then commanded by Major-General Desmond Anderson, as a General Staff Officer Grade 1 (GSO1). He was not there for long, however, as towards the end of April he was requested by Major-General Bernard Paget to be his chief of staff. Paget had been selected to command 'Sickleforce' in the Norwegian campaign. The idea behind this ultimately doomed expedition was the British and French response to the German invasion of Norway, a consequence of which led to British and French troops being sent to Narvik in the north and to Namsos and Åndalsnes in Central Norway, with the British and French given the task of expelling the Germans from the major port of Trondheim, which lay between them. Paget's 'Sickleforce' consisted mainly of the 148th Infantry Brigade, a poorly trained and equipped Territorial Army (TA) formation, which had already landed at Åndalsnes and was by that time at the village of Dombås, on the road to the town of Lillehammer, and the 15th Infantry Brigade, a well-trained Regular Army formation which had been part of the 5th Division in France with the British Expeditionary Force (BEF) until being withdrawn for the campaign in Norway.

The 148th Brigade had reached Lillehammer where it encountered the Norwegian Army, commanded by General Otto Ruge, and with which it joined forces. Soon afterwards, the brigade was attacked by strong German air and ground forces and the brigade, with a strength of only two instead of three infantry battalions, was forced to give way in great confusion and by the evening of 23 April it had been forced back all the way down the Gudbrandsdalen, the valley through which the main road ran from the Norwegian capital of Oslo to Trondheim. By now it was no longer a worthy fighting formation. Nicholson and Paget themselves arrived in Norway on 25 April along with the 15th Brigade, which relieved the 148th Brigade. The 15th Brigade was up to strength with three infantry battalions and fought skillfully in engagements at Kvam, Kjoren and Otta but was forced to withdraw, which it did so in an orderly fashion, causing heavy damage to the Germans who were pursuing them. By now, the situation in Norway was hopeless and Paget, believing his objective to be unattainable, received orders on 27 April to evacuate 'Sickleforce' from Norway. The Royal Navy achieved this with little additional loss.

Following this disastrous campaign, Nicholson returned to the United Kingdom, where he went to the 18th Infantry Division as its GSO1, a position he held until October when he was promoted to the rank of brigadier and again came into contact with Paget, this time to serve as his deputy while Paget himself was serving as Deputy Chief of the General Staff (DCGS) of Home Forces. The Commander-in-Chief, Home Forces at this time was General Sir Alan Brooke, and this brought Nicholson into contact with Brooke, who later became Chief of the Imperial General Staff (CIGS). The objective at this time, shortly after the BEF had been evacuated from France along with the French surrender had completely transformed the war situation for the United Kingdom, and the country was preparing itself for a potential German invasion.

He was appointed Commander of the Support Group of the 42nd Armoured Division in 1941 and then second-in-command of the 6th Armoured Division in 1942. In 1943 he became Brigadier General Staff for the 1st Army. In February 1943 Field Marshal Erwin Rommel launched an assault, known as the Battle of the Kasserine Pass, on units of the British First Army in Tunisia. Nicholson proved an effective combat leader who kept his remaining forces steady under relentless German hammering. The stubborn resistance of the British Nickforce, led by Nicholson, enabled British Forces to hold the vital road leading into the Kasserine Pass against the heavy pressure of the German 10th Panzer Division, which was under Rommel's direct command.

In 1944 he became General Officer Commanding 44th Indian Armoured Division, a post he held until 1944. He then became successively GOC 21st Indian Infantry Division, GOC 2nd Division, GOC 5th Indian Infantry Division and then GOC 2nd Division again – all of which commands were held while fighting in Burma.

== Post-war ==
In 1946 he became Director of Artillery at the War Office and then in 1948 he was appointed Commander-in-Chief of West Africa Command. Then in 1951 he was made General Officer Commanding-in-Chief for Western Command. Then in 1953 he became Commander in Chief Middle East Land Forces. That same year he also made a visit to East Africa at which time units were engaged in the Mau Mau Uprising. He became Adjutant General later in 1953 and retired from the British Army in 1956.

He was ADC General to the Queen from 1954 to 1956.

He was also Colonel Commandant of the Royal Artillery from 1950 to 1960 and Colonel Commandant of the Royal Horse Artillery from 1956 to 1960.

He was appointed a Companion of the Order of the Bath in 1945, advanced to Knight Commander of the Order of the Bath in 1953 and made Knight Grand Cross of the Order of the Bath in 1954. He was also appointed a Commander of the Order of the British Empire in 1943 and a Knight Commander of the Order of the British Empire in 1950.

== Retirement ==
He was also Master Gunner, St James's Park from 1956 to 1960. He was Governor of the Royal Hospital Chelsea from 1956 to 1961.

== Bibliography ==
- Mead, Richard (2007). Churchill's Lions: a biographical guide to the key British generals of World War II. Stroud (UK): Spellmount. ISBN 978-1-86227-431-0.
- Smart, Nick (2005). Biographical Dictionary of British Generals of the Second World War. Barnesley: Pen & Sword. ISBN 1844150496.

Military offices
| Preceded by John Grover | GOC 2nd Infantry Division; 1944–1946 | Succeeded by Robert Arkwright |
| Preceded by Noel Irwin | GOC West Africa Command; 1948–1951 | Succeeded by Sir Lashmer Whistler |
| Preceded by Sir Frank Simpson | GOC-in-C Western Command; 1951–1953 | Succeeded by Sir Charles Loewen |
| Preceded by Sir Brian Robertson | C-in-C Middle East Land Forces; 1953 | Succeeded by Sir Charles Keightley |
| Preceded by Sir John Crocker | Adjutant General; 1953–1956 | Succeeded by Sir Charles Loewen |
Honorary titles
| Preceded by Viscount Alanbrooke | Master Gunner, St. James's Park; 1956–1960 | Succeeded by Sir Robert Mansergh |
| Preceded by Sir Bernard Paget | Governor, Royal Hospital Chelsea; 1956–1961 | Succeeded by Sir Frank Simpson |
