= Hugh Stockwell =

British Army general (1903–1986)

General Sir Hugh Stockwell GCB KBE DSO & Bar
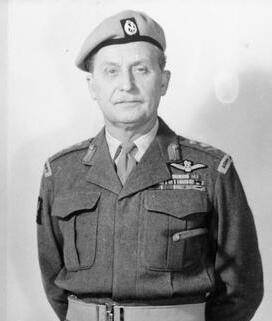
- Born: 16 June 1903; Jersey, Channel Islands
- Died: 27 November 1986 (aged 83); Swindon, Wiltshire, England
- Military career
- Allegiance: United Kingdom
- Branch: British Army
- Service years: 1923–1964
- Rank: General
- Service number: 23894
- Unit: Royal Welch Fusiliers
- Commands: Deputy Supreme Allied Commander Europe (1960–1964); I Corps (1954–1956); Malaya (1952–1954); 3rd Division (1950–1952); Royal Military Academy Sandhurst (1948–1950); 6th Airborne Division (1947–1948); 44th (Home Counties) Infantry Division (1946–1947); 82nd (West Africa) Division (1945–1946); 29th Independent Infantry Brigade (1943–1945); 30th (East Africa) Infantry Brigade (1942–1943); 2nd Battalion, Royal Welch Fusiliers (1942)
- Conflicts: Second World War; Palestine Emergency; Suez Crisis
- Awards: Knight Grand Cross of the Order of the Bath; Knight Commander of the Order of the British Empire; Companion of the Distinguished Service Order & Bar; Mentioned in Despatches (4)
- Other work: Colonel Royal Welch Fusiliers; Colonel Malay Regiment; Colonel Commandant, Army Air Corps

General Sir Hugh Charles Stockwell, GCB, KBE, DSO & Bar (16 June 1903 – 27 November 1986) was a senior British Army officer most remembered for commanding the Anglo-French ground forces during the Suez Crisis and his service as Deputy Supreme Allied Commander Europe of NATO from 1960 to 1964.

== Early life ==
Stockwell was born in Jersey, but spent his childhood in India where his father (also Hugh Charles Stockwell) served as an officer in the Highland Light Infantry. Stockwell attended Cothill House school, Marlborough College, and the Royal Military College, Sandhurst. On graduation from Sandhurst he was commissioned into the Royal Welch Fusiliers on 1 February 1923.

Stockwell was stationed in India until 1929, where he was promoted to lieutenant on 1 February 1925. He was then seconded to the Royal West African Frontier Force from 1 January 1930, and promoted to captain on 25 June 1932.

In 1935, he left the Frontier Force to join the Small Arms School Corps as a Vickers machine gun instructor in Netheravon, taking up his post on 30 January 1936. He served in that capacity until 1938.

== Second World War ==
With the approach of the Second World War, on 23 December 1938, Stockwell became brigade major of the 158th Brigade, which was known as the "Royal Welch Brigade" because it was composed entirely of three Territorial Army battalions of his regiment. He was promoted major on 1 February 1940. Unlikely to see action in Northern Ireland where his unit was based, Stockwell volunteered in March 1940 and was selected to command one of the independent companies formed to serve in the Norwegian campaign. The independent companies arrived in Norway in early May under the command of Colin Gubbins. Stockwell, commanding No. 2 Independent Company, was soon promoted to lieutenant-colonel to replace Gubbins who had been given command of 24th Guards Brigade. By late May it was clear that lacking air support the British force was outmatched and there was no alternative to evacuation. As the British withdrew from Norway, Stockwell was assigned to the rearguard and commanding a force of two independent companies and a battalion of the Irish Guards successfully held a defensive position for two days, before being ordered to withdraw. After withdrawing, he assembled two platoons and attacked the German positions to stop their assault. For his "great courage and determination" in this action, he was appointed a Companion of the Distinguished Service Order (DSO) in 1940. The citation for this award read:

STOCKWELL. MAJOR (LOCAL LIEUTENANT-COLONEL)
HUGH CHARLES. The Royal Welch Fusiliers.
When Placed in command of a mixed force of all arms at a difficult moment in the Rognan Valley operation, he showed great skill and energy in organizing a defensive Position within a short period, and by his energy and determination inspiring all ranks. He held the position successfully for 48 hours until ordered to withdraw. During the withdrawal towards a small and congested harbour, close behind where troops were embarking, he showed great courage and determination when part of his rearguard went astray. He immediately came back, collected two platoons, and went forward again with them, and put them into action to stem the German advance. This officer's military capacity and soldierly qualities were displayed at a time when the situation was most difficult.

After the Norwegian Campaign, the independent companies were disbanded but many individuals involved moved to the newly formed British Commandos. Stockwell was selected to head the commando training centre at Lochailort. In 1942, he returned to the Royal Welch to command the 2nd battalion, part of 29th Independent Infantry Brigade Group which was training in amphibious operations to take part in Operation Ironclad, the seizure of the natural port of Diego Suarez in Madagascar which was occupied by the Vichy French. The brigade left Scotland in late March 1942 and after a brief pause in South Africa, sailed for Madagascar to land unopposed on 5 May. After a day's fighting the British force achieved its objectives. The brigade group took part in further fighting in September when it was decided to take control of the whole of the island and establish Free French control.

After his success in the battle, Stockwell was promoted to brigadier in late October and given command of the 30th (East Africa) Infantry Brigade. After a tenure of only just over a month he was posted to South Africa to take command of the 29th Independent Infantry Brigade Group which was preparing to ship to India as part of 36th Infantry Division. Arriving in India in late January 1943, Stockwell remained the brigade's commander until January 1945 seeing action in the Second Arakan Campaign in early 1944 and then in northern India and Burma from mid 1944 onwards.

In January 1945, Stockwell was granted the acting rank of major-general and still in Burma, was at short notice given command of the 82nd (West Africa) Division. George Bruce, its existing commander, had displayed erratic behaviour which had resulted in Philip Christison, the commander of XV Indian Corps and a party of senior officers being placed in jeopardy when visiting the division's front. Christison placed Bruce on the sick list and called for Stockwell. Stockwell was not without his own eccentricities. He selected a WO 1 (RSM) as a sort of adviser on the Africans. This man, who Stockwell described as 'tremendous', had fought for the Germans in the First World War and won the Iron Cross. Stockwell got him a DCM (Distinguished Conduct Medal). "He must have been the only soldier to wear an Iron Cross and a DCM."

But Louis Mountbatten, the theatre supreme commander, wrote in his diary:

...so Hugh Stockwell has taken over and it is possible to visit his front in greater safety! I can hardly imagine a better Divisional Commander than the latter.

His promotion from major to acting major general had taken less than five years although on taking command of the division his permanent rank was still only lieutenant-colonel (war substantive colonel) and he became a substantive colonel only in July 1946. 82nd Division saw heavy fighting and suffered the highest casualties of any formation in XV Indian Corps. April 1945 saw the end of the division's active service but it remained in Burma until October 1946. Stockwell's major-general's rank was made permanent in May 1947. For his services in Burma he was made a Commander of the Order of the British Empire in 1945 and a Companion of the Order of the Bath in 1946. He was also mentioned in despatches in 1945.

== Post-war service ==
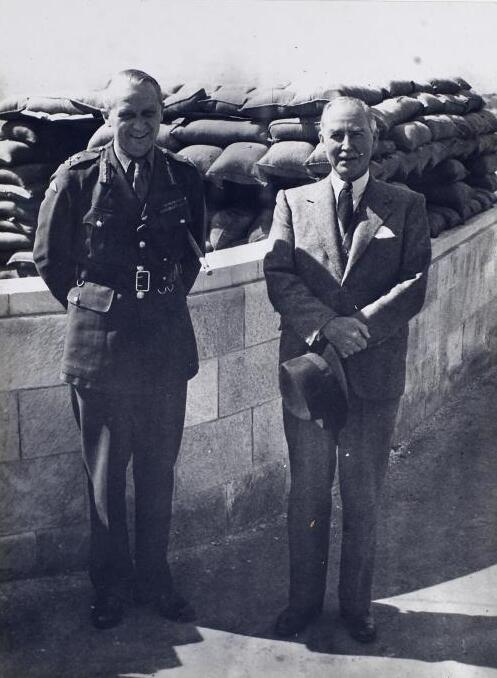
Major General Hugh Stockwell (left), GOC 6th Airborne Division, with the High Commissioner for Palestine and Transjordan, General Sir Alan Cunningham, in Palestine, April 1948.

At the end of the war, Stockwell remained in the army, commanding the 44th (Home Counties) Infantry Division until 1947. He then took command of the 6th Airborne Division, stationed in Palestine. In that capacity, "he was responsible for the evacuation" of all British troops from Palestine in 1948, as the result of the Israeli declaration of independence. In April 1948, during the Battle of Haifa, Stockwell was able to arrange a truce in Haifa between the Jewish and Arab sides. As Stockwell wrote in his report afterwards, the Arab leaders told him "that they were not in a position to sign the truce, as they had no control over the Arab military elements in the town and that, in all sincerity, they could not fulfil the terms of the truce, even if they were to sign". Instead, the Arab leaders offered "as an alternative, that the Arab population wished to evacuate Haifa and that they would be grateful for military assistance". Stockwell told the Arab leaders:

"You have made a foolish decision...Think it over, as you'll regret it afterward. You must accept the conditions of the Jews. They are fair enough. Don't permit life to be destroyed senselessly. After all, it was you who began the fighting and the Jews have won."

Despite Stockwell's advice, the Arab leaders insisted upon evacuation, and Stockwell oversaw the evacuation of 30,000 Arabs from Haifa. For his services in Palestine between March and September 1947 Stockwell was mentioned in dispatches and for his "gallant and distinguished services" in Palestine between March and June 1948 he was knighted as a Knight Commander of the Order of the British Empire, an unusual honour for an officer of major general rank.

After leaving Palestine, he was appointed Commandant of the Royal Military Academy Sandhurst, where he served until the end of 1950. Stockwell then served as General Officer Commanding East Anglian District from January to May 1951 before commanding the 3rd Division for a year.

In June 1952, Stockwell was made GOC Malaya with responsibility for the British forces fighting in the Malayan Emergency. He was raised to the temporary rank of lieutenant-general and this rank was made permanent in September 1953. In 1954, Stockwell left Malaya to take command of the I Corps and was appointed a Knight Commander of the Order of the Bath in that year's Queen's Birthday Honours, before leaving in 1956 to take command of II Corps and attached French ground forces at Port Said during the Suez Crisis. In his planning for the war against Egypt, Stockwell as ground commander for the Allied Task Force preferred slow, low-risk, methodical operations centered around the Centurion battle tank. In the summer of 1956, Stockwell rejected the Contingency Plan prepared by the British Chiefs of Staff, and instead submitted Operation Musketeer, which called for the British to take Alexandria and then for British armoured forces to engage in a decisive battle of annihilation with the Egyptians north of Cairo. Together with his deputy, the French General Andre Beaufre, Stockwell was highly opposed to the change imposed on Musketeer in September 1956 when Port Said replaced Alexandria as the main target. Stockwell was not popular with the officers who served under him. One French officer recalled that Stockwell was:

Extremely excitable, gesticulating, keeping no part of him still, his hands, his feet, and even his head and shoulders perpetually on the go, he starts off by sweeping objects off the table with a swish of his swagger cane or in his room by using it to make golf-strokes with the flower vases and ash-trays. Those are the good moments. You will see him pass in an instant from the most cheerfully expressed optimism to a dejection that amounts to nervous depression. He is a cyclothymic. By turns courteous and brutal, refined and coarse, headstrong in some circumstances, hesitant and indecisive in others, he disconcerts by his unpredictable responses and the contradictions of which he is made up. One only of his qualities remains constant: his courage under fire".

When Beaufre suggested on 3 November 1956 that the Allies launch Telescope, namely Anglo-French paratroop landings in the Canal Zone ahead of schedule, Stockwell reluctantly agreed to the change. Stockwell was always in favour of rigidly following already agreed to plans, and was most reluctant to see any changes, whereas Beaufre was all for changing plans to match with changed circumstances. The differences between Stockwell and Beaufre were summarized by the American historian Derek Varble as: "Stockwell favored existing plans; their methodical construction and underlying staff work reduced risks. Beaufre, by contrast an opportunist, saw plans merely a means to an end, without much inherent value. For him, altered circumstances or assumptions provided adequate justification to jettison part or all of the original plan".

For this service in the Suez War, he was awarded a Bar to his DSO in the 1957 Birthday Honours. In the recommendation for the award, Stockwell's commander, General Sir Charles Keightley wrote, "[Stockwell's] skill, energy and courage throughout [the Suez campaign] were of the highest order."

In February 1957 Stockwell became Military Secretary to the Secretary of State for War, and was promoted to full general that August. He served as Military Secretary until 1959 when he was appointed Adjutant-General to the Forces. He was advanced to Knight Grand Cross of the Order of the Bath in the 1959 Birthday Honours.

In 1960, on the advice of Viscount Montgomery of Alamein, Stockwell was appointed Deputy Supreme Allied Commander Europe of NATO, a post which he held until his retirement in 1964. Stockwell was described as a "surprise choice" for the position because he had never attended Staff College, Camberley, and had "spent his whole career as a fighting soldier." As Deputy Supreme Allied Commander, he worked to promote the creation of strong conventional forces, and advocated "the use of tactical nuclear weapons only as a last resort."

== Retirement ==
After retiring from the military, Stockwell became the chairman of the Kennet and Avon Canal Trust and served in a variety of other positions for corporate and charitable organizations. He died on 27 November 1986 of leukemia at the Princess Alexandra Hospital at the Royal Air Force base at Wroughton near Swindon.

== Notes ==
Military offices
Preceded by George Bruce	GOC 82nd (West Africa) Division; 1945–1946	Division disbanded
New title	GOC 44th (Home Counties) Division; 1946–1947	Succeeded by Philip Gregson-Ellis
Preceded by Eric Bols	GOC 6th Airborne Division; 1947–1948	Division disbanded
Preceded by Francis Matthews	Commandant of the Royal Military Academy Sandhurst; 1948–1950	Succeeded by David Dawnay
Preceded by Charles Firth	GOC East Anglian District; January 1951 – May 1951	Succeeded by Leslie Lockhart
Preceded by George Wood	GOC 3rd Division; 1951–1952	Succeeded by Nigel Poett
Preceded by Roy Urquhart	GOC Malaya; 1952–1954	Succeeded by Sir Geoffrey Bourne
Preceded by Sir James Cassels	GOC 1st (British) Corps; 1954–1956	Succeeded by Sir Harold Pyman
Preceded by Sir Colin Callander	Military Secretary; 1957–1959	Succeeded by Sir Geoffrey Thompson
Preceded by Sir Charles Loewen	Adjutant General; 1959–1960	Succeeded by Sir Richard Goodbody
