= Robert Arkwright =

British Army general

Major-General Robert Arkwright CB DSO*
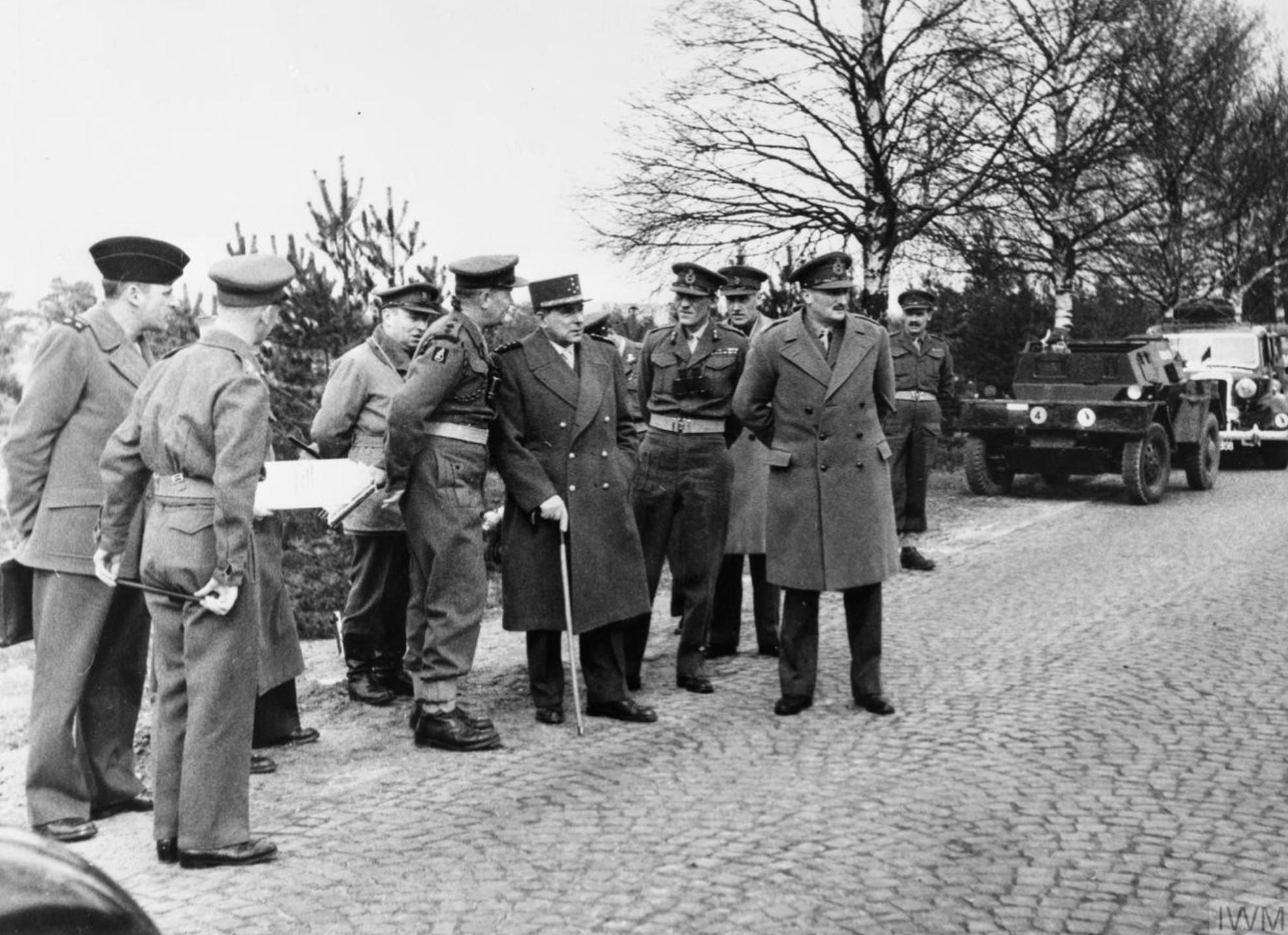
- Senior British and French Army officers observe a NATO exercise in Germany, 1950. Lieutenant Colonel Frederick Stephens explains the exercise to a group of officers, including Général d'armée Jean de Lattre de Tassigny, Major-General Robert Arkwright, and Lieutenant-General Sir Charles Keightley.
- Born: 30 July 1903; Bickley, Kent, England
- Died: 14 November 1971 (aged 68); Swindon, Wiltshire
- Military career
- Allegiance: United Kingdom
- Branch: British Army
- Service years: 1924–1951
- Rank: Major-General
- Service number: 28043
- Unit: 12th Royal Lancers
- Commands: 7th Armoured Division (1949–1951); 56th (London) Armoured Division (1948–1949); 2nd Infantry Division (1946); 23rd Armoured Brigade (1943–1946)
- Conflicts: Second World War; Greek Civil War
- Awards: Companion of the Order of the Bath; Companion of the Distinguished Service Order & Bar

Major-General Robert Harry Bertram Arkwright, CB, DSO & Bar (30 July 1903 – 14 November 1971) was a British Army officer who served in the Second World War and later commanded the 2nd Infantry Division.

== Early life ==
Arkwright was born in Bickley, Kent, England, the son of Bertram Harry Godfrey Arkwright (1879–1949) and his wife Grace Emma Julia Hurt. Francis Arkwright was his younger brother.

In 1927 Arkwright married Kathleen Gladys Hanbury. He lived at Pen y Bryn Hall in Montgomery.

== Military career ==
After attending the Royal Military College, Sandhurst, Arkwright was commissioned into the 12th Royal Lancers on 31 January 1924. He attended the Staff College, Camberley from 1934 to 1935.

Arkwright served in the Second World War, initially at the War Office as a General Staff Officer Grade 2 (GSO2), then as Deputy Assistant Adjutant General for the 1st Armoured Division during the Battle of France, as a General Staff Officer with the 8th Armoured Division and as brigadier responsible for Armoured Fighting Vehicles in the Eighth Army, before being made commander of the 23rd Armoured Brigade in 1943. As commander of the 23rd Armoured Brigade, he took part in the Sicily landings, the Italy landings, both part of the Italian Campaign, and later the Civil War in Greece. After the war he became General Officer Commanding the 2nd Infantry Division in 1946, Director of the Royal Armoured Corps in 1947 and General Officer Commanding the 56th (London) Armoured Division in 1948. His last appointment was as General Officer Commanding 7th Armoured Division from 1949 until his retirement in 1951.

Military offices
Preceded by Cameron Nicholson	GOC 2nd Division; 1946–1947	Succeeded by John Churcher
Preceded by Gerald Lloyd-Verney	GOC 56th (London) Armoured Division; 1948–1949	Succeeded by Harold Pyman
Preceded by Euan Miller	GOC 7th Armoured Division; 1949–1951	Succeeded by Charles Jones
