= Victor Campbell (British Army officer) =

British Army general (1905–1990)

Major-General Victor Campbell CB DSO OBE
- Born: 9 March 1905
- Died: 4 June 1990 (aged 85); South Brent, Devon, England
- Military career
- Allegiance: United Kingdom
- Branch: British Army
- Service years: 1924–1957
- Rank: Major-General
- Service number: 30818
- Unit: Queen's Own Cameron Highlanders
- Commands: 1st Battalion, Gordon Highlanders; 31st Lorried Infantry Brigade
- Conflicts: Second World War
- Awards: Companion of the Order of the Bath; Companion of the Distinguished Service Order; Officer of the Order of the British Empire

Major-General Victor David Graham Campbell CB DSO OBE (9 March 1905 – 4 June 1990) was a British Army officer of the Second World War and post-war period.

== Early life ==
Campbell was the son of General Sir David Campbell and Janet Mary Aikman. He was educated at Rugby School and the Royal Military College, Sandhurst.

== Military career ==
He commissioned into the Queen's Own Cameron Highlanders on 30 August 1924. He was promoted to captain in 1935, and between 1933 and 1935 served as Adjutant of the 2nd Battalion, The Queen's Own Cameron Highlanders at Aldershot. Campbell then served as an instructor at RMC Sandhurst until 1938. In 1939 he undertook the staff course at the Staff College, Camberley, before serving with his regiment in the Battle of France. On 12 June 1940 he was captured by German forces and became a prisoner-of-war. He was kept at Colditz Castle from 1942 until his liberation in 1945, when he was awarded the Distinguished Service Order.

Between October 1945 and July 1946, Campbell served with the Allied HQ in the Netherlands East Indies, after which he was invested as an Officer of the Order of the British Empire. In February 1949 he transferred to the Gordon Highlanders and became commander of the regiment's 1st Battalion. Between December 1950 and November 1952 he was Commanding Officer, 31st Lorried Infantry Brigade in the British Army of the Rhine. From 1954 to 1957 he was Chief of Staff, HQ Scottish Command, and retired on 6 April 1957 with the rank of major-general. In 1956 he was invested as a Companion of the Order of the Bath.

== Other work ==
Campbell became a Justice of the Peace in 1962, and in April 1962 became a Deputy Lieutenant for Devon. He served as High Sheriff of Devon in 1968.

== Personal life ==
He married Dulce Beatrix, daughter of G.B. Collier and the widow of Lt. Col. J.A. Goodwin, in 1947. Campbell died in South Brent, Devon in 1990.
