= Ashton Wade =

British Army officer

Major-General Ashton Wade CB OBE MC
- Born: 13 March 1898; Saffron Walden, Essex, England
- Died: 14 January 1996 (aged 97); Norwich, Norfolk, England
- Military career
- Allegiance: United Kingdom
- Branch: British Army
- Service years: 1916–1950
- Rank: Major-General
- Service number: 19214
- Units: Royal Garrison Artillery; Royal Corps of Signals
- Commands: Madras Area; Malaya District
- Conflicts: First World War; Second World War
- Awards: Companion of the Order of the Bath; Officer of the Order of the British Empire; Military Cross; Mentioned in Despatches

Major-General Douglas Ashton Lofft Wade, CB, OBE, MC (13 March 1898 – 14 January 1996) was a British Army officer who commanded Malaya District after the Second World War.

== Military career ==
Wade was commissioned into the Royal Garrison Artillery in 1916 and served in the First World War in France and Belgium from 23 September 1916 to 20 December 1916 and in Italy from 20 September 1917 to 4 November 1918. He was wounded twice, awarded the Military Cross (MC) and was mentioned in despatches. The citation for his MC appeared in The London Gazette in September 1918 and read:

For conspicuous gallantry and devotion to duty when all the telephone lines from brigade headquarters to batteries and observation posts had been cut by enemy shell fire. He took out linesmen under heavy fire and mended them; and also kept up visual signalling and a service of runners, so that brigade headquarters were rarely out of communication with batteries and observation posts, and orders were successfully carried out.

Wade transferred to the Royal Corps of Signals in 1921, by which time the war was over. He attended the Staff College, Camberley, from 1933 to 1934. He served as Deputy Assistant Quartermaster General in Quetta in India from 1 January 1938 to 31 July 1939. He served in the Second World War as a General Staff Officer 1 with the British Expeditionary Force in France from 26 April to 30 June 1940 and took part in the Dunkirk evacuation in 1940. He was again appointed General Staff Officer 1 from 1 July 1940 to 15 May 1941. Wade was mentioned in despatches for distinguished service in connection with operations in the field March in June 1940. He was appointed an Officer of the Order of the British Empire on 1 July 1941.

Wade continued his war service as assistant adjutant and quartermaster general for 2nd Division in Hull from 16 May 1941 to 3 October 1942. He was appointed deputy adjutant general and acting major-general 4 October 1942 in Simla and as commander of the Madras Area in India from 1944. He was made General Officer Commanding Malaya District in 1947 and then became member of First and Second War Crimes Review of Sentences Boards for German, Italian and Japanese war criminals in 1948 (the second review included Field Marshal Erich von Manstein) before retiring in 1950.

In retirement Wade became telecommunications attaché in Washington D.C. and then senior planning engineer at the Independent Television Authority.

== Family ==
In 1926 Wade married Heather Bulmer; they had one daughter. Following the death of his first wife he married Cynthia Halliday (née Allen) in 1972.

== Publications ==
- Wade, Major-General Ashton (1988). A Life on the Line. Costello Publishing Company. ISBN 978-0710430397.

== Bibliography ==
- Smart, Nick (2005). Biographical Dictionary of British Generals of the Second World War. Barnsley: Pen and Sword Books. ISBN 1844150496.

Military offices
Preceded by Sir Alexander Galloway	GOC Malaya District; 1947–1948	Succeeded by Sir Charles Boucher
