= Douglas Wimberley =

British Army general (1896–1983)

Major-General Douglas Wimberley CB DSO MC
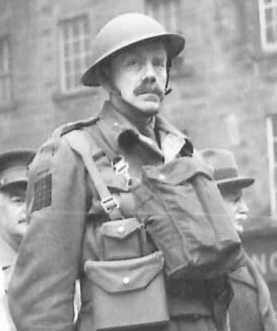
- Wimberley with the 152nd Infantry Brigade in Inverness, February 1941
- Born: 15 August 1896; Inverness, Scotland
- Died: 26 August 1983 (aged 87); Coupar Angus, Scotland
- Military career
- Allegiance: United Kingdom
- Branch: British Army
- Service years: 1915–1946
- Rank: Major-General
- Nicknames: "Tartan Tam" "Lang Tam"
- Service number: 10800
- Units: Queen's Own Cameron Highlanders; Machine Gun Corps
- Commands: Staff College, Camberley (1943−1944); 51st (Highland) Infantry Division (1941−1943); 46th Infantry Division (1941); 152nd Infantry Brigade (1940−1941); 13th Infantry Brigade (1940); 1st Battalion, Queen's Own Cameron Highlanders (1938−1939)
- Conflicts: First World War; Russian Civil War; Anglo-Irish War; North-West Frontier; Second World War
- Awards: Companion of the Order of the Bath; Distinguished Service Order; Military Cross; Mentioned in despatches (2)
- Other work: Gentleman Usher of the Scarlet Rod; Principal of University College, Dundee

Major-General Douglas Neil Wimberley, CB, DSO, MC (15 August 1896 – 26 August 1983) was a British Army officer who, during the Second World War, commanded the 51st (Highland) Division for two years, from 1941 to 1943, notably at the Second Battle of El Alamein, before leading it across North Africa and in the Allied campaign in Sicily.

== Early life and First World War ==
Douglas Neil Wimberley was born on 15 August 1896 at 8 Ardross Terrace, Inverness, Scotland, the son of Surgeon-Captain Charles Neil Campbell Wimberley, and Minnie Lesmoir Gordon, daughter of R. J. Wimberley.

Wimberley was educated at Alton Burn, Nairn, Wellington College, followed by Cambridge University. In December 1914, four months after the outbreak of the First World War, he entered the Royal Military College, Sandhurst and, on 11 May 1915, he was commissioned as a second lieutenant, into his grandfather's regiment, the Queen's Own Cameron Highlanders. His first posting was with the 3rd (Militia) Battalion of his regiment at Invergordon before his eventual posting, in September, to the 1st Battalion on the Western Front. The battalion, a Regular Army unit, formed part of the 1st Brigade of the 1st Division. In October, Wimberley, now aged 19 and the machine gun officer of his battalion, fought in the Battle of Loos.

In January 1916 he was seconded to the newly created Machine Gun Corps (MGC) and served with the 1st and 2nd Brigade machine gun companies, serving with them during the Somme offensive in the second half of 1916. He was promoted to lieutenant on 17 March 1916, and, in October, was sent to England, where he attended the Machine Gun Training Centre at Grantham, Lincolnshire and, returning to the Western Front, was promoted to the acting rank of captain on 12 February 1917, and assumed command of the 232nd Machine Gun Company, which in July became part of the 51st (Highland) Division, a Territorial Force (TF) formation.

Wimberley's company fought in the Battle of Passchendaele (also known as the Third Battle of Ypres). In November he was wounded and awarded the Military Cross during the Battle of Cambrai. In early 1918 the four machine gun companies of the division were merged into the 51st Machine Gun Battalion, resulting in his company being retitled as 'D'Company. On 18 February 1918 Wimberley was promoted to the acting rank of major. The German Army launched its Spring Offensive in late March and Wimberley was again wounded and, evacuated to England, was passed fit for service in June and attended a machine gun refresher course at Grantham the following month, but was not to see any further action during the war. He was soon afterwards posted as a company commander in the 9th Reserve Battalion, Machine Gun Corps, a training unit. In October/November he attended a Royal Air Force (RAF) cooperation course, with the intention of training infantry officers to be air observers. He was there by the time of the Armistice with Germany in November, which brought the war to an end.

== Between the wars ==
Shortly after the end of the war, in 1919, Wimberley, now serving with the 8th Battalion, MGC, was despatched to Russia during the Russian Civil War. In December 1919 he returned to the Queen's Own Cameron Highlanders. Wimberley chose to stay in the army during the interwar period and, in 1921, served as the assistant adjutant of the 2nd Battalion, Cameron Highlanders, then stationed at Queenstown during the Irish War of Independence. Wimberley's battalion, a Regular Army unit, was regarded by Bernard Montgomery, the brigade major of the parent Cork Brigade, to be the best troops available to act as a "flying column" to round up rebels. 1922 saw Wimberley made the adjutant of the 2nd Battalion, Camerons. Two years later he gained distinction in promotion examinations and was allowed to spend a year at Emmanuel College, Cambridge. On 29 April 1925 he married Elsye Myrtle Livingston, daughter of Captain F. L. Campbell of the Royal Navy, of Achalader, Perthshire. With her, he had one son and one daughter.

Following his studies, Wimberley attended the Staff College, Camberley from 1926 to 1927, where he was a student in a class of instructors who would lead the army to victory in the next war, such as Bernard Montgomery, Alan Brooke and Bernard Paget, with fellow students such as Harold Alexander, Charles Hudson, Roy Bucher, Alan Duff, George Wood, John Clark, Noel Holmes, Sidney Archibald, Euan Miller, John Albert Charles Whitaker, Leonard Arthur Hawes, William Holden, Noel Holmes, Richard Bond and Richard Lewis, along with Warren Melville Anderson of the Australian Army.

After his marriage, the still-young Wimberley's peacetime career progressed steadily. In 1929 he was appointed brigade major of the 1st Gurkha Brigade, which was involved in operations in the North West Frontier Province a year later. On 1 January 1933 Wimberley was promoted to the brevet rank of major, the same year that he won the Army Quarterly military prize for an essay on recent military campaigns.

Wimberley then served as a General Staff Officer Grade 2 (GSO2) at the War Office for four years, during which time he received a promotion on 3 January 1934 to major, and brevet lieutenant-colonel on 1 January 1936, before returning to an active command when he was promoted to the rank of lieutenant-colonel on 19 December 1938 and succeeded Lieutenant-Colonel James Gammell as commanding officer (CO) of the 1st Battalion, Cameron Highlanders, then stationed in England, which he commanded until the outbreak of war nine months later.

== Second World War ==
Shortly after the Second World War began, in September 1939, Wimberley took his battalion to France, where it formed part of the British Expeditionary Force (BEF). The battalion was part of Brigadier Gerald Gartlan's 5th Infantry Brigade, part of the 2nd Infantry Division, then commanded by Major-General Charles Loyd, and arrived in France in late September. There was no immediate action, however, and in late December Wimberley was sent to England and made GSO1 and Chief Instructor at the Senior Officers' School, Sheerness, so missing the hostilities in France which commenced in May 1940.

Made an acting colonel on 16 March 1940, Wimberley was, on 20 July 1940, shortly after the Dunkirk evacuation, promoted to the acting rank of brigadier and succeeded Brigadier Miles Dempsey in command of the 13th Brigade, part of the 5th Infantry Division. The division was then stationed in Scotland under Scottish Command, reforming after having played a distinguished part in the Battle of France, but suffering alarmingly heavy casualties in the process. The division was commanded by Major-General Horatio Berney-Ficklin, succeeding the original general officer commanding (GOC), Major-General Harold Franklyn, on the same day as Wimberley took command of the 13th Brigade. Wimberley was to remain with the brigade for just seven weeks, however, as in mid-September he was posted to the 152nd Infantry Brigade, part of the 51st (Highland) Infantry Division, whose GOC was then Major-General Alan Cunningham, who was replaced in late October by Major-General Neil Ritchie. On 17 October 1940 Wimberley's permanent rank was promoted to colonel, with seniority backdated to 1 January 1939.

On 21 May 1941 Wimberley was promoted to the acting rank of major-general and became GOC of the 46th Infantry Division, succeeding Major-General Charles Hudson, who had been one of Wimberley's fellow students at the Staff College, Camberley in the late 1920s. The division was a second-line Territorial Army (TA) formation that had fought with the BEF the year before and, like the 5th Division, had suffered heavy losses but was now reformed. He was to remain with the division for just three weeks as, in mid-June, after handing over the 46th to Major-General Miles Dempsey, he returned to the 51st (Highland) Division, this time as its GOC. He was made GOC at the specific request of his predecessor, Ritchie, who was then being posted to the Middle East.

The 51st (Highland) Division to which Wimberley was now GOC was a very different formation from that which Wimberley had served with during the Great War. Formerly, the division's reputation had been forged over successive battles in the trenches of the Western Front. The division which he now commanded was in reality the untried 9th (Highland) Infantry Division, the sister TA division to the 51st, created with the intention of supplying drafts of men as reinforcements to the 51st, which had been renumbered after the latter's surrender during the Battle of France on 12 June 1940. The division as it stood would now be able to fight as a unit, and Wimberley made a successful effort to instill a sense of esprit de corps in the unit. He refused "Sassenach" troops for his brigades and battalions whilst "poaching" Scottish troops from other units, and appealed to his men's Scottish patriotism by encouraging the wearing of their respective tartans as much as possible, for which he was dubbed "Tartan Tam", and later "Lang Tam", due to his 6'3" height. The only non-Highland unit in the 51st Division was the 1st/7th Battalion, Middlesex Regiment, because there was no machine gun battalion in the British Army which recruited exclusively in Scotland. The Cockneys, as it turned out, got along very well with the Highlanders. At the same time, training was not neglected. The results would manifest themselves in action.

=== North Africa ===
In late March 1942 the division moved from Scotland down to Aldershot in South-Eastern Command, then commanded by Lieutenant-General Bernard Montgomery, who had been an instructor of Wimberley's at the Staff College, for its final stages of training before being sent overseas. Wimberley's rank of major-general was made temporary on 21 May 1942, and, towards the end of June, the 51st Division left the United Kingdom, destined for North Africa. In August the division arrived in Egypt to join the Eighth Army. Missing the Battle of Alam el Halfa, the 51st Division went into the line in mid-September, initially as part of XIII Corps, under Lieutenant-General Brian Horrocks, later transferring in October to XXX Corps, under Lieutenant-General Oliver Leese (a fellow student at the Staff College), as the new Eighth Army commander, Lieutenant-General Bernard Montgomery began preparing for the offensive which would defeat the Axis forces, which were led by Generalfeldmarschall Erwin Rommel, in North Africa. In October and November, the division figured prominently in the "break-in" and "crumbling phase" of the Battle of El Alamein and actions round Kidney Ridge. Before the battle, Wimberley had briefed his COs with a model of the battlefield and instructed them to repeat their tasks as he had shown them, so as to ensure the unity of the division's battle plan.

Before and during the battle, Wimberley had become a familiar sight touring the divisional areas, an incongruous spectacle in his jeep with his knees nearly reaching head height. During the battle Wimberley's jeep was blown up by a mine, killing two of the occupants but only badly shaking Wimberley himself. He often paused to assist troops carrying out work or briefed individual private soldiers, so as to make them better understand the part which they were to play. Therefore, the casualties suffered by the Eighth Army, amounting to nearly a quarter of the infantry force, caused Wimberley to comment "never again". Having observed in the closing stages of the battle an assault by his Highlanders which had gone in without an artillery barrage, he wrote:

The position was, as we had reported, strongly held, not a sign of our tanks was to be seen, but plenty of enemy ones... The Gordons made little progress, and lost a lot of men; I felt it had been sheer waste of life and was sick at heart.

Known, trusted and respected by Montgomery, Wimberley led the 51st Division across North Africa and almost continuously throughout the Tunisian Campaign, fighting at Mareth, Medinine, Akarit and Enfidaville, and Adrano. On 29 December 1942 Wimberley was awarded the Distinguished Service Order (DSO) for "gallant and distinguished services" so far in the campaign.

The pace of the pursuit of Rommel – the fear of another battle of attrition like Alamein – began to tell. In his unpublished memoirs, Wimberley wrote of the Battle of El Agheila:

The 14th December is a day I will never forget....As I motored forward I saw every 100 yards or so wounded men, mostly sappers who had become casualties on the mines. The black Macadam road wound through the soft sand of the desert, pitch black in the brilliant sunshine. At intervals all down the road, mile after mile, the enemy had spread shovel-fulls of sand, and under every sixth heap or so, a mine had been buried, a hole having been drilled in the tarmac for it. About every quarter of a mile along the road derelict vehicles had been pulled across it, to block it, and each vehicle was a mass of trip wires and booby traps....I was told the very corpses of our poor dead, which we lost out on patrol, were all booby trapped, when later the burial parties went out to clear the battlefield and bury them.... Never again, while I commanded the Highland Division, did we ever meet such a heavily mined area.

To Wimberley was entrusted the task of taking Buerat and opening the way to Tripoli, before supplies ran out over a tenuous chain of communication, so fast had the Eighth Army advanced. Having opened the way to the city – the first major Axis prize to fall in the whole of the war so far – Wimberley's achievement went virtually unrecognised by Montgomery, who accused him of "dilatoriness". Wimberley forgave all during the Battle of Medenine, however, when he wrote, "I felt grateful, and thought, again, what a wonderful little commander I was serving under, in Monty."

Shortly after the capture of Tripoli, Wimberley's division was visited by Winston Churchill, the British Prime Minister, and General Alan Brooke, now the Chief of the Imperial General Staff (CIGS), who, like Montgomery, had formerly been one of Wimberley's Staff College instructors. On 4 February 1943, when Churchill and Brooke arrived, Wimberley ordered a composite brigade of the 51st Division, all of whom were wearing kilts and were led by the massed pipers, to march past the Prime Minister and CIGS. Both men were moved to tears by the encounter. Brooke wrote in his diary later that night about the encounter:

At 9:30am we all assembled and started off by car for Tripoli. It was most interesting seeing the place for the first time. The streets and housetops were lined with sentries, who held back the local inhabitants. When we arrived on the main square we found there the bulk of the 51st Division formed up on the sea front and the main square. The last time we had seen them was near Ismailia just after their arrival in the Middle East. Then they were still pink and white, now they bronzed warriors of many battles and of a victorious advance. I have seldom seen a finer body of men or one that looked prouder of being soldiers. We drove slowly round the line and then came back with men cheering him [Churchill] all the way. We then took up our position on a prepared stand and the whole Division marched past with a bagpipe band playing. It was quite one of the most impressive sights I have ever seen. The whole Division was most beautifully turned out, and might have been in barracks for the last 3 months instead of having marched some 1200 miles and fought many battles during the same period.

The campaign in Tunisia came to an end on 13 May 1943, with the Allies capturing nearly 250,000 Axis soldiers, although Wimberley and the 51st Division was, by this time, in Algeria resting after six months of combat, absorbing reinforcements, and, later, training in combined operations in preparation for the Allied invasion of Sicily. On 24 June 1943 Wimberley was mentioned in despatches for his services in North Africa.

=== Sicily ===
In July 1943 Wimberley led the 51st Division, again serving under Leese's XXX Corps, during the Allied invasion of Sicily (codenamed Operation Husky). At this time, all three of Wimberley's brigades were commanded by future general officers, the 152nd by Gordon MacMillan, the 153rd by Horatius Murray and the 154th by Tom Rennie. The division was involved in heavy fighting until gradually being relieved in August by the 78th Infantry Division.

Despite the renowned fighting ability and reputation of the 51st, Montgomery decided after the campaign in Sicily in August 1943 that Wimberley, although Montgomery admired him greatly, was showing tiredness after over two years in command, and should be removed from his command and replaced. This he did, and Wimberley was replaced by Major-General Charles Bullen-Smith, of the King's Own Scottish Borderers, who had been GOC of the 15th (Scottish) Infantry Division, another TA formation. In the event, Bullen-Smith was himself replaced by Major-General Tom Rennie, a Highlander, in July 1944, when the division was fighting in Normandy after being brought back to the United Kingdom by Montgomery (upon his promotion to command the 21st Army Group) to spearhead the Allied invasion of Normandy (codenamed Operation Overlord). On 5 August 1943 Wimberley was made a Companion of the Order of the Bath (CB).

Whilst Montgomery judged "Tartan Tam" Wimberley as unsuitable for corps command, he recommended him to his mentor and friend, General Alan Brooke, the CIGS, for the position of Commandant at the Staff College, Camberley, a recommendation which was accepted. He assumed command in September, after a long leave, returning to the college nearly twenty years after he had attended it as a student, in turn succeeding Major-General Alan Cunningham. By now the course at the Staff College had been considerably reduced in length (down from just over two years in peacetime to a mere five months), due mainly to the needs of the wartime army, with its role being now to produce large numbers of competent staff officers in the shortest time possible, although the appointment itself was still seen as a very prestigious posting.

On 31 July 1944 Wimberley's rank of major-general was confirmed (with seniority backdated to 24 December 1943) and, in mid-December, Wimberley relinquished this appointment and, after handing over to Major-General Philip Gregson-Ellis, was appointed Director of Infantry at the War Office, his last appointment in the army, for which he was responsible for infantry training, although his assignment came at a difficult time, with the British Army then suffering from a severe manpower crisis, and the infantry having been forced to accept the worst recruits throughout the war. He held this post until his resignation from the army on 8 October 1946, after a 31-year military career, when it became clear that, with Montgomery having now become CIGS, in succession to Brooke, he would progress no higher in the army.

Richard Mead wrote that "Wimberley will always be associated with the Highland Division, which became under his command one of the best-known of all British formations, with a reputation which spread a long way beyond Scotland. A superb motivator of men and a fearless leader in battle, he restored not only the honour of a division, but of a whole country."

== Postwar ==
Upon leaving the army Wimberley became principal of University College, Dundee, which was at the time a constituent college of the University of St Andrews. The University of St Andrews, steeped in tradition and jealous of its academic reputation refused to allow the academic expansion of its sister college which led to agitation in Dundee for the independence of the Dundee College. Wimberley attempted to expand University College whilst at the same time not undermining the parent University, and its principal, James Irvine.

Without much academic power, Wimberley sought to give the college the same esprit de corps with which he had invigorated the 51st (Highland) Division. He worked as closely with the staff and students of the college as he had with the officers and men of his division.

In 1947 he wrote the "Wimberley Memo", which set the scene for the parting of ways between the University of St Andrews, and the former University College, Dundee. In honour of this event, the University of Dundee awards annually the Wimberley Award to the student who has contributed most to university life.

In his role as Principal of University College, Dundee Wimberley helped to found the Abertay Historical Society in 1947, along with the History lecturer Dr. Wainwright. The society, which is still active, was formed to encourage the study of the history of the Abertay area (Dundee, Angus, Perthshire and northern Fife). According to University of Dundee historian Kenneth Baxter, Wimberley set up the Society as part of a process of developing 'town and gown links' in Dundee.

In 1954, University College was replaced by Queen's College Dundee. The post of Principal of University College was replaced by the new role of Master of Queen's College. Wimberley was not considered for this new position and left the University. Having retired, he took up genealogy and lived with his wife in the town of Coupar Angus, Perthshire. From 2 September 1951 until 1961 he was colonel of the Queen's Own Cameron Highlanders. In 1973, Wimberley collated his papers and diaries into a five-volume autobiography called Scottish Soldier. This unpublished memoir was deposited by the general in the National Library of Scotland.

He died at Foxhall, Coupar Angus, on 26 August 1983, shortly after turning 87. He was survived by his son Neil Wimberley (b. 1927), who lives with his wife in Foxhall, and daughter Lesmoir Edington (1926-2019) living in Haddington, Scotland.

His name lives on in Dundee with the Wimberley Houses, Dundee University student accommodation by Ninewells Hospital. The University of Dundee Archive Services also holds his papers relating to his time as Principal of University College.

== Bibliography ==
- Alanbrooke, Field Marshal Lord (2001). Danchev, Alex; Todman, Daniel (eds.). War Diaries 1939–1945. Phoenix Press. ISBN 1-84212-526-5.
- Hamilton, Nigel (1981). Monty : the making of a general, 1887–1942. London: Hamish Hamilton. OCLC 174371477.
- Hamilton, Nigel (1983). Monty: Master of the Battlefield 1942–1944. London: Hamish Hamilton. OCLC 174371481.
- Mead, Richard (2007). Churchill's Lions: a biographical guide to the key British generals of World War II. Stroud (UK): Spellmount. ISBN 978-1-86227-431-0.
- Smart, Nick (2005). Biographical Dictionary of British Generals of the Second World War. Barnesley: Pen & Sword. ISBN 1844150496.
- Scottish Soldier by Major-General D.N. Wimberley. Unpublished memoir in the possession of the NLS.
- Monty: A Personal Memoir by Major-General D.N. Wimberley. Unpublished memoir.

Military offices
Preceded by Charles Hudson	GOC 46th Infantry Division; May–June 1941	Succeeded by Miles Dempsey
Preceded by Neil Ritchie	GOC 51st (Highland) Infantry Division; 1941–1943	Succeeded by Charles Bullen-Smith
Preceded by Alan Cunningham	Commandant of the Staff College, Camberley; 1943–1944	Succeeded by Philip Gregson-Ellis
Honorary titles
Preceded by Charles Longcroft	Gentleman Usher of the Scarlet Rod; 1948–1954	Succeeded by Robert Sherbrooke
Academic offices
Preceded by Angus Fulton	Principal of University College Dundee; 1946–1954	Post abolished
Honorary titles
Preceded by James Drew	Colonel of the Queen's Own Cameron Highlanders; 1951–1961	Succeeded by Regiment consolidated to form the Queen's Own Highlanders (Seaforth and Camerons)
