= Euan Miller =

British Army general (1897–1985)

Lieutenant-General Sir Euan Miller KCB KBE DSO MC
- Born: 5 July 1897; Laxey, Isle of Man
- Died: 30 August 1985 (aged 88); Tunbridge Wells
- Military career
- Allegiance: United Kingdom
- Branch: British Army
- Service years: 1915–1955
- Rank: Lieutenant-General
- Service number: 11736
- Unit: King's Royal Rifle Corps
- Commands: 7th Armoured Division (1949–1951); Hannover District (1948–1949); 2nd Battalion, King's Royal Rifle Corps (1940)
- Conflicts: First World War; Second World War
- Awards: Knight Commander of the Order of the Bath; Knight Commander of the Order of the British Empire; Distinguished Service Order; Military Cross; Mentioned in Despatches (2)

Lieutenant-General Sir Euan Alfred Bews Miller, KCB, KBE, DSO, MC (5 July 1897 – 30 August 1985) was a senior British Army officer who fought in both world wars and later went on to be Military Secretary.

== Military career ==
Euan Miller was born on 5 July 1897 and was educated at Wellington College, Berkshire and, later, at the Royal Military College, Sandhurst. He was commissioned as a second lieutenant into the King's Royal Rifle Corps on 17 April 1915. He served with his regiment during the First World War in France and Salonika.

Miller remained in the army between the wars, attending the Staff College, Camberley from 1926 to 1927, alongside fellow students such as Douglas Wimberley, Charles Hudson, Edward Williams, George Wood, John Whitaker, Noel Holmes. He became a General Staff Officer in Northern Ireland District in 1928 and on 15 December 1930 he was appointed as brigade major of the 7th Infantry Brigade, part of the 3rd Division in Southern Command.

He moved on to be a General Staff Officer at the War Office in 1934 and at the Staff College, Camberley in 1936. He was promoted to brevet major on 1 July 1934.

Miller served in the Second World War as a General Staff Officer at the General Headquarters of the British Expeditionary Force and then as commanding officer of the 2nd Battalion, King's Royal Rifle Corps during the Defence of Calais in 1940. He spent the remainder of the war as a prisoner of war. After the war, he became Deputy Military Secretary and then Commander of Hanover District in Germany from 1948. He was then General Officer Commanding 7th Armoured Division, before being appointed Chief of Staff at Middle East Land Forces in 1949 and Military Secretary in 1951. He retired in 1955.

In 1955 Miller led an inquiry into under-age soldiers in the British Army, which made various recommendations in the form of a White Paper and led to higher education standards and improved training for boys destined to join the army.

In retirement, Miller became Lieutenant of the Tower of London.

== Family ==
In 1926 Miller married Margaret Petrena Brocklebank and they went on to have one son and two daughters.

Military offices
Preceded by Sir Kenneth McLean	Military Secretary; 1951–1954	Succeeded by Sir Colin Callander
New command	GOC 7th Armoured Division; 1949–1951	Succeeded by Robert Arkwright
