= John Copley (producer) =

British theatre producer

John Copley CBE
- Born: 12 June 1933 (age 92); Birmingham, West Midlands, England, UK
- Occupations: Theatre and opera producer
- Spouse(s): John Hugh Chadwyck-Healey (civil partner 2006–2014)

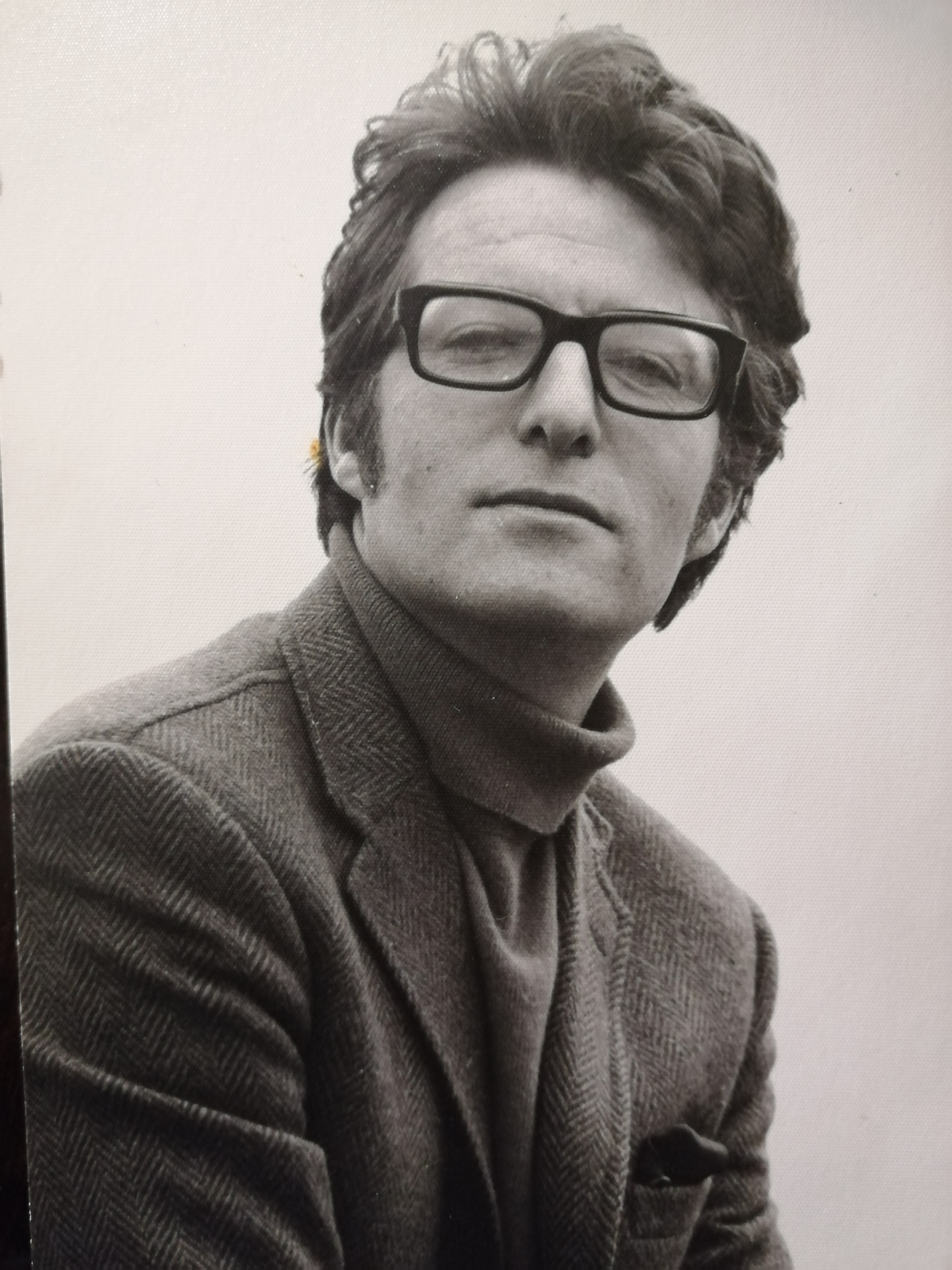
John Copley

John Michael Harold Copley CBE (born 12 June 1933), is a British theatre and opera producer and director.

He was born in Birmingham to Ernest and Lilian (née Forbes) Copley, and attended King Edward VI Five Ways grammar school. Later, he attended the Sadlers Wells Ballet School for a year before training as a production designer at The Central School of Art, while working as a supernumerary at the Covent Garden Opera Company.

He became an assistant stage manager for Sadler’s Wells Opera Ballet before becoming the stage manager for Sadler's Wells Touring Opera. He later worked in the West End on productions of Keep Your Hair On, The World of Paul Slickey and My Fair Lady. He was then invited to work as a stage manager for the Covent Garden Opera and as the Technical Manager of Benjamin Britten’s Aldeburgh Festival in 1960. While there, he oversaw the premier of A Midsummer Night’s Dream (opera).

By the mid-60s, Copley was working as staff director at Covent Garden and assisting directors including John Gielgud, Luchino Visconti and Franco Zeffirelli. He worked with Zeffirelli on the famous production of Tosca with Maria Callas and Tito Gobbi, Act 2 of which was filmed for television. He also revived existing productions at Covent Garden, including Madama Butterfly – Covent Garden’s first opera in Italian, instead of English, starring Renata Scotto and Elektra with Birgit Nilsson.

In 1967, he was invited to direct Covent Garden’s first production of Così fan tutte since World War II. This led to further engagements at Covent Garden, including Le Nozze di Figaro, La Boheme and Semele out of 16 new productions and various revivals. His La Boheme ran from 1974 till 2015.

Copley also directed 13 productions for Sadler’s Wells Opera and English National Opera – as it became. He frequently collaborated with Dame Janet Baker. Their productions of Julius Caesar and Mary Stuart were filmed for television. Furthermore, he worked with the Welsh National Opera, including their production of Falstaff for Prince Charles’ investiture as Prince of Wales.

John Copley produced 21 productions for Opera Australia, including the official opening of the Sydney Opera House (The Magic Flute), the official opening of the Opera Centre, Melbourne (Don Carlo) and the Australian premier of Leoš Janáček's Jenůfa in 1974^{[1][2]}.

His career also took him to America where he directed 120 new productions in houses across the country from New York to Los Angeles. He worked frequently for San Francisco Opera, Santa Fe Opera, New York City Opera and the Metropolitan Opera and many of his productions were syndicated around the states, particularly his Eugene Onegin and Il Barbiere di Siviglia, inspired by Magritte.

Copley worked less frequently in Europe. However, he did produce work for Athens Opera Festival, Greek National Opera, Aix-en-Provence Festival, the Bayerische Staatsoper and the Deutsche Oper in Berlin. It was while in his production of L’elisir d’amore at the Deutsche Oper that Pavarotti broke the world record for Most Curtain Calls (165), which he still holds.

In 1965, he performed the role of Ferdy in A Patriot for Me by John Osborne, who wrote the role for John. The play was controversial as it featured not just the first 'gay kiss' in recorded West End history, but also a drag ball. Copley was central to both scenes, kissing Maximilian Schell nightly and singing opera excerpts in falsetto and rococo drag. Consequently, the Royal Court Theatre had to be converted into a private club to get round the censor. As John was working at Covent Garden, he performed under his mother's maiden name as John Forbes.

For over 50 years Copley was the partner of John Hugh Chadwyck-Healey (1922–2014), grandson of Charles Chadwyck-Healey, 1st Baronet. In 2006, they contracted a civil partnership, which Copley described when he was a guest on the BBC Radio 4 Desert Island Discs programme on 3 January 2010.

Copley was appointed Commander of the Order of the British Empire (CBE) in the 2014 New Year Honours for services to opera.

In January 2018, during choir rehearsals for a revival of Copley's 1990 production of Rossini's Semiramide at the Metropolitan Opera in New York City, Copley coached the singers to show reactions to the appearance of Nino's ghost at the end of act 1. He suggested that he would "imagine the character naked" which prompted a complaint from a chorister. The Met's manager Peter Gelb then fired Copley, citing a different account of the complaint. Gelb's action has been described as a "witch hunt" and been widely criticised by other cast members, opera singers and managers. The American Guild of Musical Artists also considered Gelb's response to be inappropriate, and "believed the episode could have been resolved amicably". At the time of Copley's firing, the Met was investigating allegations of sexual misconduct made by four former students against former music director James Levine, details of whose private life were said to have been widely known; in these circumstances the company made sure in reporting on its decision regarding Copley to emphasise its "strong policies in place relating to workplace behaviour (placing) paramount importance on the welfare of its artists and staff".
