= General Burke =

General Burke may refer to:

- John Burke (spy) (1830–1871), Confederate Adjutant General of Texas
- Rosetta Burke (born 1937), U.S. Army Reserve major general

== See also ==
- Edward Burke-Gaffney (1900–1981), British Army major general
- Attorney General Burke (disambiguation)
