= Bernard Penfold =

British Army officer (1916–2015)

Major-General Bernard Penfold CB LVO
- Born: Robert Bernard Penfold; 19 December 1916
- Died: 22 April 2015 (aged 98)
- Military career
- Allegiance: United Kingdom
- Branch: British Army
- Service years: 1936-1972
- Rank: Major-General
- Commands: 6th Bn King's African Rifles; 127th Infantry Brigade; South East District
- Awards: Companion of the Order of the Bath; Lieutenant of the Royal Victorian Order

Major-General Robert Bernard Penfold CB LVO (19 December 1916 – 22 April 2015) was a British Army officer who commanded South East District.

== Military career ==
Penfold was commissioned into the Leicestershire Regiment in 1936 and then transferred to the Indian Army. He served in World War II as an officer in Iraqforce and after the War transferred to the Royal Artillery. He became commanding Officer of 6th Battalion King's African Rifles in Tanganyika in 1959. He was appointed commander of 127th Infantry Brigade in 1962, Security Operations Advisor to the High Commissioner in Aden during the Aden Emergency in 1964 and Chief of Defence Staff, Kenya Defence Forces in 1966. He went on to be general officer commanding South East District in 1969 before he retired in 1972. He was appointed CB in 1969 and died in 2015.

After he retired from the Army, he became the first general manager of the Royal Hong Kong Jockey Club from 1972 to 1979. Penfold Park in the centre of the Sha Tin Racecourse, which was constructed during his term of office as general manager, is named in his honour.

Military offices
Preceded by Charles Stainforth	GOC South East District; 1969–1972	Succeeded by Sir Allan Taylor
