= General McLean =

General McLean may refer to:

- Francis McLean (British Army officer) (c. 1717–1781), British Army brigadier general
- Hugh Havelock McLean (1854–1938), Canadian Army brigadier general (promoted to major general upon retirement)
- Kenneth McLean (1896–1987), British Army lieutenant general
- Nathaniel McLean (1815–1905), Union Army brigadier general

== See also ==
- Jeremiah McLene (1767–1837), Pennsylvania Militia major general in the American Revolutionary War
- Sir Fitzroy Maclean, 1st Baronet (1911–1996), British Army major general
- Sir Fitzroy Maclean, 8th Baronet (c. 1770–1847), British Army general
