= Charles Stainforth =

British Army general

Major-General Charles Stainforth CB OBE
- Born: 12 December 1914
- Died: 22 March 2001 (aged 86)
- Military career
- Allegiance: United Kingdom
- Branch: British Army
- Rank: Major-General
- Service number: 378004
- Commands: Aldershot District; South East District
- Conflicts: World War II; Korean War
- Awards: Companion of the Order of the Bath; Officer of the Order of the British Empire

Major-General Charles Herbert Stainforth CB OBE (12 December 1914 – 22 March 2001) was General Officer Commanding Aldershot District.

== Military career ==
Stainforth was commissioned into the Indian Army in 1936 and fought in World War II: he transferred to the Royal Army Service Corps in 1948.

He also fought in Korea being appointed an Officer of the Order of the British Empire for his services there in 1955. In 1965, as a Brigadier, he was appointed Chief of Staff at Southern Command.

He became General Officer Commanding Aldershot District in 1966 and General Officer Commanding South East District in 1967. In 1969 he was invited to become Chairman of the Committee reviewing the UK Army Command Structure. He retired later that year.

He lived at Farnham in Surrey and died in 2001 aged 86.

Military offices
Preceded by Patrick Man	GOC Aldershot District; 1966–1967	Succeeded by Command disbanded
New title	GOC South East District; 1967–1969	Succeeded by Bernard Penfold
