= Richard Craddock =

British Army general (1910–1977)

Lieutenant-General Sir Richard Craddock KBE CB DSO
- Born: Richard Walter Craddock; 3 August 1910; Calcutta, British India
- Died: 14 February 1977 (aged 66); Andover, Hampshire, England
- Military career
- Allegiance: United Kingdom
- Branch: British Army
- Service years: 1930–1966
- Rank: Lieutenant-General
- Service number: 47540
- Unit: Buffs (Royal East Kent Regiment)
- Commands: 2nd Battalion, South Wales Borderers; 1st Battalion, Suffolk Regiment; Commander of British Forces in Hong Kong; Western Command
- Conflicts: World War II
- Awards: Knight Commander of the Order of the British Empire; Companion of the Order of the Bath; Distinguished Service Order

Lieutenant-General Sir Richard Walter Craddock KBE CB DSO (3 August 1910 – 14 February 1977) was a senior officer of the British Army who achieved high office in the 1960s.

== Military career ==
Educated at Charterhouse School and the Royal Military College, Sandhurst, Richard Craddock was commissioned into the Royal East Kent Regiment (Buffs) in 1930.

He served in the Second World War, initially in the British Expeditionary Force (BEF) in the Battle of France; in 1943 he was a member of the Prime Minister Winston Churchill's delegation to Washington, D.C., Quebec, and Cairo. In 1944 he became Commanding Officer of the 2nd Battalion, South Wales Borderers, fighting in North West Europe, in which capacity he earned a DSO, before moving on to be Commanding Officer of the 1st Battalion, Suffolk Regiment, which was also serving in North West Europe, later that year. He was wounded in action several times, losing one foot and part of a leg.

After the War he remained in the Army and in 1949 became Military Assistant to the Chief of the Imperial General Staff, moving on to a posting as Director of Plans at the War Office in 1951.

He was appointed Major General in charge of Administration for the British Army of the Rhine (BAOR) in West Germany in 1957 and became Director of Military Operations at the War Office in 1959. He served as Commander of British Forces in Hong Kong from 1963 to 1964, when he became GOC Western Command; he retired in 1966.

In 1965 he was made Colonel of the Queen's Own Buffs, The Royal Kent Regiment, becoming colonel of the Queen's Regiment in 1966 after amalgamation, a position he held until 1973.

Military offices
Preceded by Sir Reginald Hewetson	Commander of British Forces in Hong Kong; 1963–1964	Succeeded by Sir Denis O'Connor
Preceded by Sir Edward Howard-Vyse	GOC-in-C Western Command; 1964−1966	Succeeded by Sir Antony Read
