= Ronald Bramwell-Davis =

English cricketer and Major-General

Major-General Ronald Bramwell-Davis CB DSO
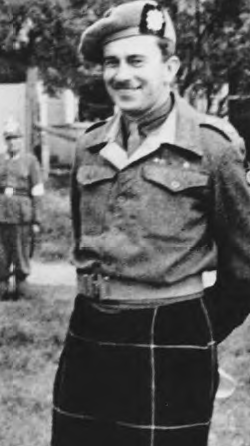
- Colonel Ronald Bramwell Davis in 1945.
- Born: 8 October 1905; Scotland
- Died: 12 May 1974 (aged 68); Andover, Hampshire
- Burial place: Aldershot Military Cemetery
- Military career
- Allegiance: United Kingdom
- Branch: British Army
- Service years: 1925−1960
- Rank: Major-General
- Service number: 33622
- Units: Highland Light Infantry; Royal Highland Fusiliers
- Commands: Aldershot District
- Conflicts: World War II
- Awards: Companion of the Order of the Bath; Distinguished Service Order

Major-General Ronald Albert Bramwell-Davis CB DSO (8 October 1905 – 12 May 1974) was a keen cricketer as well as General Officer Commanding Aldershot District.

== Family ==
Bramwell-Davis was born in Scotland in 1905, the son of Captain Percy Bramwell-Davis and his wife, Evelyn Mary, the daughter of Albert Richard Tull of Crookham House at Thatcham in Berkshire.

== Military career ==
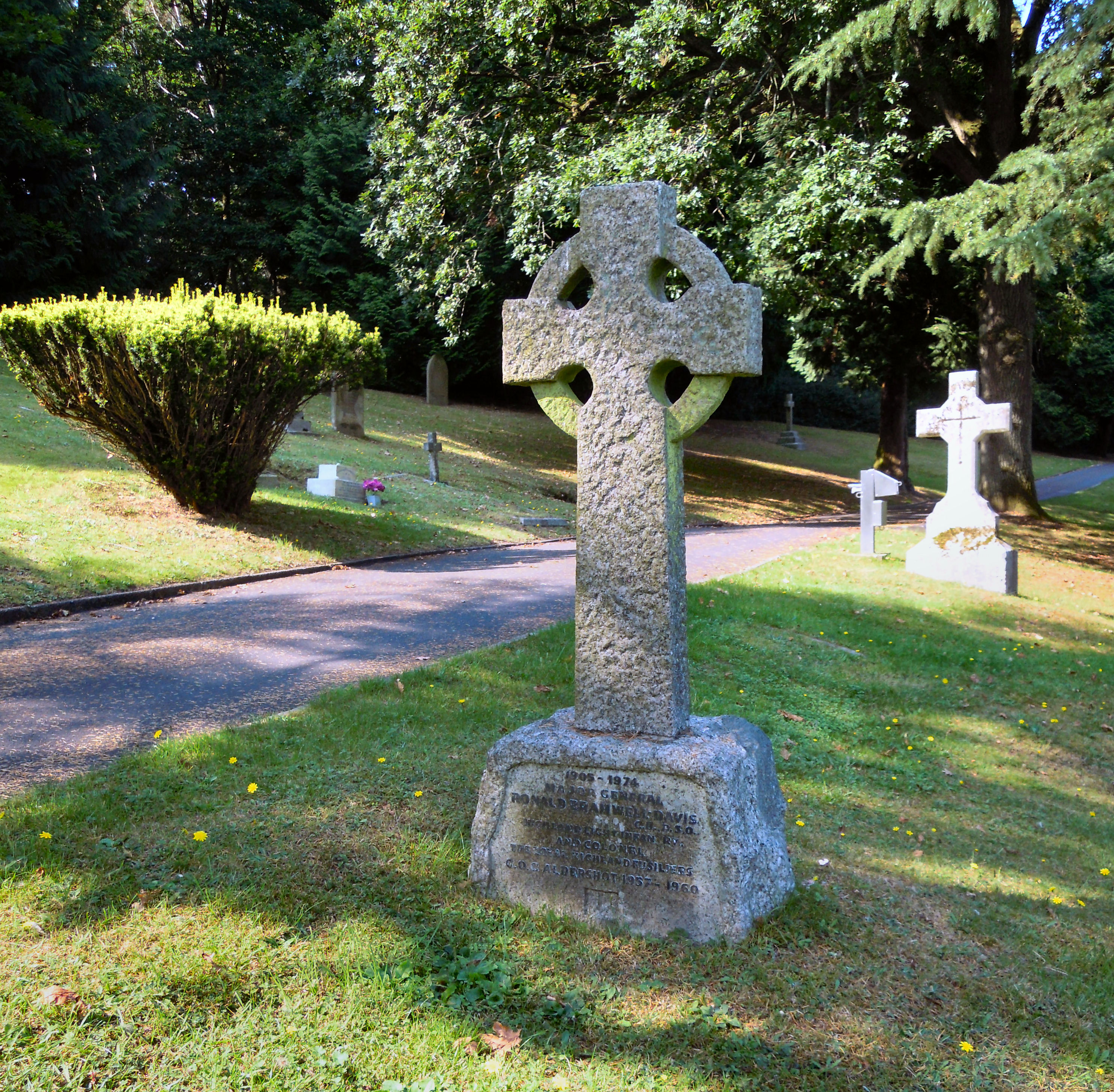
The grave of Major-General Ronald Bramwell-Davis.

Bramwell-Davis was commissioned into the Highland Light Infantry on 3 September 1925, after graduating from the Royal Military College, Sandhurst. He played for Berkshire County Cricket Club in the Minor Counties Cricket Championship in 1933. He served in the Second World War and then went on to be Brigadier with responsibility for Infantry matters in Asmara in Eritrea in the late 1940s. Returning to the United Kingdom, he was appointed Chief of staff at Southern Command.

Bramwell-Davis became General Officer Commanding (GOC) Aldershot District in 1956 and was appointed CB in 1957. He retired in 1960.

He was also Colonel of the Royal Highland Fusiliers.

Ronald Bramwell-Davis is buried in Aldershot Military Cemetery.

Military offices
Preceded by Sir Douglas Campbell	GOC Aldershot District; 1956–1960	Succeeded by Sir Denis O'Connor
