= Douglas Campbell (British Army officer) =

British Army general (1899–1980)

Major-General Sir Douglas Campbell KBE CB DSO MC
- Born: 20 June 1899; Kashmir, India
- Died: 3 April 1980 (aged 80); Aldershot, Hampshire, England
- Military career
- Allegiance: United Kingdom
- Branch: British Army
- Rank: Major-General
- Service number: 5768
- Unit: Royal Engineers
- Commands: Aldershot District
- Conflicts: World War I World War II
- Awards: Knight Commander of the Order of the British Empire; Companion of the Order of the Bath; Distinguished Service Order; Military Cross

Major-General Sir Alexander Douglas Campbell (20 June 1899 – 3 April 1980) was General Officer Commanding Aldershot District.

== Military career ==
Educated at Cheltenham College, Queens' College, Cambridge, and the Royal Military Academy Woolwich, Campbell was commissioned into the Royal Engineers 1917 and served in World War I.

He also served in World War II becoming Assistant Director for Bomb Disposal in 1940. He was appointed Chief Engineer for IX Corps in North Africa in 1943 and successively for I Corps in Normandy in 1944, for 2nd Army also in 1944 and for 14th Army in 1945.

After the War he was made Deputy Director of Tactical Investigation and then transferred to Middle East Land Forces in 1947. He became Engineer-in-Chief at the War Office in 1948 and Vice Adjutant-General to the Forces in 1952. He was appointed General Officer Commanding Aldershot District in 1954 and retired in 1957.

In retirement he was Lieutenant Governor of the Royal Hospital Chelsea from 1957 to 1962 and Colonel Commandant of the Royal Engineers from 1958 to 1964.

In 1969, he acted as the military advisor to Richard Attenborough's film production of Oh! What a Lovely War.

He lived at Shipley near Horsham in Sussex.

== Family ==
In 1923 he married Patience Loveday Carlyon.

Military offices
Preceded by Edward Burke-Gaffney	GOC Aldershot District; 1954–1956	Succeeded by Ronald Bramwell-Davis
