= 182nd (2nd Warwickshire) Brigade =

2/1st Warwickshire Brigade 182nd (2/1st Warwickshire) Brigade 182nd Infantry Brigade
- Active: 1914–1919; 1939–1945
- Country: United Kingdom
- Branch: British Army
- Type: Infantry
- Size: Brigade
- Part of: 61st (2nd South Midland) Division; 61st Infantry Division
- Engagements: First World War; Second World War

Commanders
- Notable commanders: Cyril Blacklock; Charles Hudson

The 182nd (2/1st Warwickshire) Brigade was an infantry brigade of the British Army that saw active service in the First World War with the 61st (2nd South Midland) Division. It remained in the United Kingdom throughout the Second World War, serving with the 61st Infantry Division.

== First World War ==
The brigade was formed as a duplicate of the 143rd (1/1st Warwickshire) Brigade and consisted of those men in the Territorial Force who did not wish to serve overseas. The brigade was assigned to the 61st (2nd South Midland) Division. With the division, the brigade served on the Western Front from May 1916 onwards.

=== Order of battle ===
- 2/5th Battalion, Royal Warwickshire Regiment (disbanded February 1918)
- 2/6th Battalion, Royal Warwickshire Regiment
- 2/7th Battalion, Royal Warwickshire Regiment
- 2/8th Battalion, Royal Warwickshire Regiment (disbanded February 1918)
- 182nd Machine Gun Company, Machine Gun Corps (formed 19 June 1916, moved to 61st Battalion, Machine Gun Corps 1 March 1918)
- 182nd Trench Mortar Battery (formed 13 June 1916)
- 2/8th Battalion, Worcestershire Regiment (from February 1918)

== Second World War ==
The brigade was disbanded after the war in 1919. It was, however, reformed again in 1939 in the Territorial Army, now as the 182nd Infantry Brigade, prior to the outbreak of the Second World War when war with Nazi Germany was becoming increasingly obvious. It was assigned to the 61st Infantry Division. However, the brigade never saw active service overseas and remained in the United Kingdom throughout the war.

=== Order of battle ===
182nd Infantry Brigade was constituted as follows during the war:

- 2/7th Battalion, Royal Warwickshire Regiment
- 9th Battalion, Royal Warwickshire Regiment (disbanded 25 July 1944)
- 9th Battalion, Worcestershire Regiment
- 182nd Infantry Brigade Anti-Tank Company (formed 2 September 1940, left 6 October 1941 to join 61st Reconnaissance Battalion)
- 1st Battalion, South Wales Borderers (from 2 September 1944)

=== Commanders ===
The following officers commanded 182nd Infantry Brigade during the war:

- Brigadier R.J. Cash (until 15 February 1940)
- Brigadier E.S.B. Williams (from 15 February 1940 until 31 July 1941)
- Brigadier C.E. Hudson (from 31 July 1941 until 27 November 1943)
- Brigadier J.S. Nichols (from 27 November 1943 until 28 March 1945)
- Brigadier T.B.L. Churchill (from 28 March 1945)

== Bibliography ==
- Joslen, H. F. (2003) [1960]. Orders of Battle: Second World War, 1939–1945. Uckfield, East Sussex: Naval and Military Press. ISBN 978-1-84342-474-1.
