= Patrick Man =

British Army general (1913–1979)

Major-General Patrick Man CB CBE DSO MC
- Born: 17 March 1913; Kent, England
- Died: 10 October 1979 (aged 66)
- Military career
- Allegiance: United Kingdom
- Branch: British Army
- Service years: 1933−1968
- Rank: Major-General
- Service number: 58144
- Unit: Royal Hampshire Regiment
- Commands: Aldershot District
- Conflicts: World War II; Malayan Emergency
- Awards: Companion of the Order of the Bath; Commander of the Order of the British Empire; Distinguished Service Order; Military Cross

Major-General Patrick Holberton Man CB CBE DSO MC (17 March 1913 – 10 October 1979) was General Officer Commanding Aldershot District.

== Military career ==
Man was commissioned into the Hampshire Regiment (later the Royal Hampshire Regiment) in 1933.

He served in World War II initially as a Staff Captain with 22nd Infantry Brigade and then as a General Staff Officer with 4th Infantry Division, with the War Office and then with the Staff College, Camberley. In 1943 he was appointed Assistant Quartermaster General at the Headquarters of the Supreme Allied Commander for South East Asia Command moving on to be Director of Administration Planning there in 1944.

After the War he became Assistant Adjutant General at the War Office before becoming a General Staff Officer at the Imperial Defence College in 1952. He served in Malaya during the Malayan Emergency from 1954 and then became Director of Administration Planning at the War Office in 1956. In 1958 he moved to the War Office and in 1959 he went to the British Army of the Rhine. He was made General Officer Commanding Aldershot District in 1963 and Director of Personal Services (Army) at the Ministry of Defence in 1966; he retired in 1968.

He was also Colonel Commandant of the Military Provost Staff Corps from 1967 to 1972.

In retirement he wrote The Great Rebellion of Queen Boudicca, a historical novel about Queen Boudica.

He lived at Wickham Market in Suffolk where he died in 1979.

Military offices
Preceded by John Francis Metcalfe	GOC Aldershot District; 1963−1966	Succeeded by Charles Stainforth
