= Charles Hudson (British Army officer) =

British military officer

Brigadier Charles Hudson VC CB DSO* MC
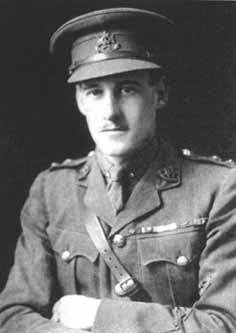
- Hudson in 1918
- Born: 29 May 1892; Derby, Derbyshire, England
- Died: 4 April 1959 (aged 66); St Mary's, Isles of Scilly, England
- Burial place: St Mary's Churchyard, Denbury, Devon, England
- Military career
- Allegiance: United Kingdom
- Branch: British Army
- Service years: 1914–1946
- Rank: Brigadier
- Service number: 10029
- Units: Sherwood Foresters; King's Own Scottish Borderers
- Commands: 182nd Infantry Brigade (1941–1943); 159th Infantry Brigade (1941); 46th Infantry Division (1940–1941); 2nd Infantry Brigade (1938–1940); 2nd Battalion, Sherwood Foresters (1918); 11th (Service) Battalion, Sherwood Foresters (1918)
- Conflicts: First World War; Russian Civil War; Second World War
- Awards: Victoria Cross; Companion of the Order of the Bath; Distinguished Service Order & Bar; Military Cross; Mentioned in Despatches (5); Croix de Guerre (France); Silver Medal of Military Valor (Italy)

Brigadier Charles Edward Hudson, VC, CB, DSO & Bar, MC (29 May 1892 – 4 April 1959) was a British Army officer and an English recipient of the Victoria Cross (VC), the highest award for gallantry in the face of the enemy that can be awarded to British and Commonwealth forces.

== Early life ==
Charles Edward Hudson was born in Derby on 29 May 1892, Oak Apple Day, the second son and third child of Lieutenant-Colonel Herbert Edward Hudson of the Sherwood Foresters and his wife . He was educated at a preparatory school in East Grinstead, Surrey, and later at Sherborne School, Dorset, which he attended from September 1905 to July 1910. Charles did not stand out during his time at Sherborne School. He later recounted, in his journal published in the biography by his son, Miles Hudson, Two Lives 1892–1992, that being morbidly afraid of physical pain he was "terribly conscious of being a coward on the football field" and that it was not until he had been at Sherborne for some years that he was able to overcome these physical fears.

After leaving Sherborne, Hudson went to the Royal Military College at Sandhurst, where he encountered Harold Alexander and admired him greatly, with the two becoming great friends, but was unable to finish the one-year course owing to the death of his father. Instead he went to Ceylon and from 1912 to 1914 worked as an apprentice tea planter, also engaged in the first experimental rubber planting on the island. There, he served part-time in the Ceylon Mounted Rifles, in an independent section formed of six young Europeans in the district he was working.

== First World War ==
On the outbreak of the First World War in August 1914, Hudson returned to England and was granted a commission as a temporary second lieutenant in his father's regiment, the Sherwood Foresters, on 17 November 1914. He was made a temporary lieutenant on 8 February 1915, and a temporary captain on 11 October 1915, acting major on 21 November 1916, permanent captain in the Regular Army on 13 May 1917 and temporary lieutenant-colonel on 8 March 1918, ending the war as an acting lieutenant-colonel, having been promoted on 29 September.

He was posted to the newly raised 11th (Service) Battalion, a Kitchener's Army unit, with whom he served in France and Belgium, most notably during the Battle of the Somme, and Italy from 1917, ending the war with the rank of temporary lieutenant-colonel, having been promoted to that rank on 23 November 1917, shortly after becoming commanding officer (CO) of his battalion, aged just 25. The battalion, composed largely of civilian volunteers from coalfields in the counties of Derbyshire and Nottinghamshire, formed part of the 70th Brigade of the 23rd Division and left for France in August 1915.

During the conflict he received numerous military honours: in 1916 he was awarded the Military Cross (MC), in 1917 the Distinguished Service Order (DSO) and Bar, and in 1918 the Victoria Cross (VC). He was also mentioned in despatches five times, on 15 June 1916, 30 May 1916, 21 December 1917, 6 January 1919, 9 July 1919 and 3 February 1920, and was awarded the Croix de Guerre and the Italian Silver Medal of Military Valor. He was awarded a Bar to his DSO on 23 November 1917. The bar's citation reads as follows:

For conspicuous gallantry and devotion to duty. He was in command of a sector of the front line for several days during an action, and organised and carried out the defence of the position under continuous and violent enemy shelling. It was entirely due to his organisation and personal supervision of the work that the line was able to resist heavy enemy counter-attacks. He showed splendid leadership and great energy and courage.

At the age of just 26, Hudson was one of the youngest Old Shirburnians to be awarded the VC.

In Testament of Youth, Vera Brittain describes several meetings with the convalescent Hudson while she was trying to discover the circumstances of the death of her brother, Captain Edward Brittain, who had served under Hudson, and was killed on 15 June 1918 in the attack in which Hudson won his VC.

=== VC action ===
Hudson was awarded the Victoria Cross for his actions on 15 June 1918 near Asiago, Italy, during the Second Battle of the Piave River, as a 26-year-old temporary lieutenant-colonel in command of the 11th Battalion Sherwood Foresters. The citation appeared in a supplement to The London Gazette on 11 July 1918.

Capt. (T./Lt.-Col.) Charles Edward Hudson, D.S.O., M.C., Notts. & Derby. R.

For most conspicuous bravery and devotion to duty when his battalion was holding the right front sector during an attack on the British front.

The shelling had been very heavy on the right, the trench destroyed, and considerable casualties had occurred, and all the officers on the spot were killed or wounded. This enabled the enemy to penetrate our front line.

The enemy pushed their advance as far as the support line which was the key to our right flank. The situation demanded immediate action. Lt.-Col. Hudson, recognising its gravity, at once collected various headquarter details, such as orderlies, servants, runners, etc., and, together with some Allies, personally led them up the hill.

Driving the enemy down the hill towards our front line, he again led a party of about five up the trench, where there were about 200 enemy, in order to attack them from the flank. He then with two men got out of the trench and rushed the position, shouting to the enemy to surrender, some of whom did. He was then severely wounded by a bomb which exploded on his foot. Although in great pain, he gave directions for the counter-attack to be continued, and this was done successfully, about 100 prisoners and six machine-guns being taken.

Without doubt the high courage and determination displayed by Lt.-Col. Hudson saved a serious situation, and had it not been for his quick determination in organising the counter-attack a large number of the enemy would have dribbled through, and counter-attack on a larger scale would have been necessary to restore the situation.

== Between the wars ==
After the war, Hudson, against advice and having embarked with a US Navy ship, volunteered to serve in the North Russia Intervention during the Allied intervention in the Russian Civil War, where he was deployed as a brigade staff officer under the command of Brigadier-General Edmund Ironside at Archangel.

Returning to England, in 1920 Hudson married Gladys Lee, from Glendale, Northumberland, who he had first met in London after having been wounded in Italy in 1918. They had two sons, John Patrick Charles, born on 11 April 1922, who was killed in North Africa in 1943, and Miles Matthew Lee, born on 17 August 1925. Their first years of marriage, spent in Derby, were difficult, and Hudson, initially unwilling to do so, chose to remain in the army, although the pay was barely sufficient, and both he and his wife had to live on army rations.

The first few years of Hudson's service as a Regular Army officer were spent mainly on regimental duties, initially as adjutant to his regiment's 3rd (Militia) Battalion, holding this post from 11 March 1920 until 10 March 1923. He attended the Staff College, Camberley from 1926 to 1927, where his fellow students included Harold Alexander, William Holden, Douglas Wimberley, Rob Lockhart, Richard Lewis, Roy Bucher, George Clark, Richard Bond, Eric Harrison, Sidney Archibald, George Wood, Reginald Nolder, Euan Miller, Brian Robertson and Noel Holmes, all of whom were to become general officers in the upcoming war. His instructors included men such as Wilfrid Lindsell, Bernard Paget, Ronald Adam, Alan Brooke and Bernard Montgomery, Robert Gordon-Finlayson, Henry Pownall and Harold Franklyn. Hudson's time there was not particularly distinguished, and by the end of his first year he was almost dropped from the course, for being either consistently lazy or lacking in interest. Hudson was critical of, and often rebelled against, the methods his instructors used, believing them to not differ significantly from the methods used by the senior commanders in the Great War, which often failed with a heavy cost in human life. He furthermore believed that the Staff College's training was inadequate if the army was to fight another major European war. His attitude was described by his instructors as awkward and often inclined to be pig-headed. Nevertheless, Hudson, for the most part, enjoyed his time there and he was recommended for future employment.

Soon after graduating from the Staff College, Hudson returned to his regiment's 1st Battalion, then stationed in Northern Ireland, serving there for six months, before he transferred on 27 July 1928 to the King's Own Scottish Borderers (KOSB), with the rank of major, after being told that there was little chance of promotion in his own regiment. After serving with Malaya Command as a staff officer from 1930 to 1932, he was promoted to brevet lieutenant-colonel on 1 January 1932. He became a Chief Instructor in the grade of General Staff Officer Grade 3 (GSO3) at the Royal Military College, Sandhurst from 31 January 1933 until 31 January 1937. He then returned to the 2nd Battalion of his regiment, serving in the Catterick Garrison, North Yorkshire, before moving down to Portsmouth to become part of the 9th Infantry Brigade, commanded by Brigadier Bernard Montgomery, who had been one of Hudson's Staff College instructors.

Hudson was promoted to brevet lieutenant-colonel on 30 April 1938 and, on 2 June, to the temporary rank of brigadier (and full colonel on the same date) and took command of the 2nd Brigade. The brigade was one of three which formed part of the 1st Infantry Division, whose general officer commanding (GOC) was Major-General Harold Alexander, an old friend from Sandhurst and Camberley days. This move was initiated by Leslie Hore-Belisha, the new Secretary of State for War, who wanted to promote younger officers.

== Second World War ==
Soon after the outbreak of the Second World War in September 1939, Hudson led his brigade overseas to France as part of the British Expeditionary Force (BEF). The brigade, after several months of relative inactivity during the "Phoney War" period, saw action throughout May 1940, when the German Army launched its invasion of France, which resulted in the brigade, along with the rest of the BEF, being forced to retreat to Dunkirk, from where it was evacuated to England in late May/early June.

For his services in France and Belgium Hudson was made a Companion of the Order of the Bath (CB) on 11 July. With the threat of a German invasion of the United Kingdom, Hudson's brigade, along with the rest of the division, now commanded by Major-General Kenneth Anderson after Alexander was promoted to command I Corps, commenced anti-invasion duties, including beach defence, until mid-December when Hudson received his first divisional command.

Promoted to the acting rank of major-general on 14 December, Hudson became GOC of the 46th Infantry Division, a second-line Territorial Army (TA) formation, taking over from Major-General Desmond Anderson. Formed in October 1939 as a duplicate of the 49th (West Riding) Infantry Division, the 46th Division comprised the 137th, 138th and 139th Infantry Brigades, along with supporting divisional troops. The division, minus its divisional troops, had fought in France with the BEF, sustaining extremely heavy casualties due to its poor level of training, and after being evacuated, was then serving in Scotland under Scottish Command, reorganising after its heavy losses. Soon after Hudson became GOC, in early January 1941 the 46th Division moved to Cambridgeshire, then Norfolk, where it came under the command of Lieutenant-General Edmund Osborne's II Corps, serving under Eastern Command and, like it had in Scotland, focused on reorganising and training to repel a German invasion, although then considered unlikely in winter. Hudson only held the command for just over five months, until May 1941, after a dispute with Osborne, his senior officer, which resulted in his demotion to the substantive rank of colonel, and he never again held a divisional command, nor regained his rank of major-general. Osborne, who, possibly envious of Hudson being the holder of a VC, interfered with Hudson's command, writing to his battalion and brigade commanders without Hudson knowing, organising exercises, and visiting the division without informing its GOC. Hudson wrote an official letter of complaint. Osborne arrived, apologised and promised that he would no longer interfere, and went away on two weeks' leave. However, when he returned Hudson received an official report that he was, in his corps commander's opinion, unfit to command a division. Hudson, following Osborne's own advice, appealed, unsuccessfully, and he lost command of the division. He was succeeded as GOC of the 46th Division by Major-General Douglas Wimberley, a fellow student at the Staff College in the mid-1920s, who was sympathetic to Hudson's plight. Hudson wrote that "There are few blows in life which are more shattering than wounded pride. I felt personally shamed and disgraced. I had worn the insignia of a general long enough to become known to relatives, friends and acquaintances as such, and now I had to tell them that I had dropped to a rank lower than that I held before the war".

After his demotion, he briefly commanded the 159th Infantry Brigade, part of the TA 53rd (Welsh) Infantry Division, then serving in Northern Ireland, but was soon sent to command the 182nd Brigade, part of the 61st Infantry Division, another TA formation which was also serving as British Troops in Northern Ireland. The division returned to the mainland in February 1943, moving to Essex and took part in Exercise Spartan, and moved to Kent in May, and the division was initially selected to play a role in Operation Overlord, the Allied invasion of Normandy, only to be reduced to the Lower Establishment soon after, becoming essentially a training formation with the intention of supplying replacements to overseas units. Handing over command of the 182nd Brigade to Brigadier John Nichols in late November, he became aide-de-camp to King George VI from 1944 until his retirement from the army in 1946.

== Postwar ==
He was awarded the Order of St John of Jerusalem (Commander). He died on holiday in the Scilly Isles on 4 April 1959, at the age of 66, with the cause of death being coronary thrombosis. Hudson was buried at St Mary's Church, Denbury in South Devon.

An obituary for Brigadier Charles Edward Hudson was published in the Old Shirburnian Society Annual Report in September 1959, reading:

The decorations bestowed on Charles Edward Hudson themselves give proof of his calibre as a soldier: V.C., C.B., D.S.O and bar, M.C., Croix de Guerre, and Italian Silver Medal for Valour. He was a graduate of the Staff College, had been the Chief Instructor at the Royal Military College, Sandhurst from 1933 to 1936, had commanded a Battalion and Infantry Brigade and from 1944 to 1946 was an A.D.C. to the King. In 1949 he became the Devon County Commissioner of St Johns Ambulance Brigade and later, Chairman of the Order of St John in Devon. His two sons were both Shirburnians – J.P.C. Hudson (Harper House 1936–1940) was killed in action in North Africa in 1943, and M.M.L. Hudson (Harper House 1939–1943) is a Major in the 12th Royal Lancers. His brother T.H. Hudson was at The Green from 1903 to 1906. It was most fitting that such a distinguished Shirburnian whose own son was amongst those whose memory was there to be perpetuated, should perform the ceremony opening the Big Schoolroom on 10 November 1956. His speech on that occasion will still be fresh in the minds of those who heard it.

His medals are on display at Nottingham Castle.

== Writings ==
Hudson wrote his memoirs in a 730-page journal later published by his son Miles in 1992. He also wrote many poems based on experiences as far back as childhood that were also unpublished in his lifetime, as were two radio plays (never produced), ten short stories and many reflections on secular subjects. His only work published in his lifetime were several chess problems that appeared in chess magazines.

== Bibliography ==
- Gliddon, Gerald (2005). The Sideshows. VCs of the First World War. Gloucestershire, England: Sutton Publishing. ISBN 978-0-7509-2084-1.
- Smart, Nick (2005). Biographical Dictionary of British Generals of the Second World War. Barnesley: Pen & Sword. ISBN 1844150496.
- Miles Hudson, Soldier, Poet, Rebel: The Extraordinary Life of Charles Hudson VC (The History Press Ltd., 2007). ISBN 978-0-7509-4436-6

Military offices
Preceded by Desmond Anderson	GOC 46th Infantry Division; 1940–1941	Succeeded by Douglas Wimberley
