= Attorney General Burke =

Attorney General Burke may refer to:

- Denis Burke (Australian politician) (born 1948), Attorney-General of the Northern Territory
- T. J. Burke (born 1972), Attorney General of New Brunswick

== See also ==
- General Burke (disambiguation)
