= Denis O'Connor (British Army officer) =

British Army general

Lieutenant-General Sir Denis O'Connor KBE CB
- Born: 2 July 1907; Simla, British India
- Died: 18 January 1988 (aged 80); Surrey, England
- Military career
- Allegiance: United Kingdom
- Branch: British Army
- Service years: 1927–1966
- Rank: Lieutenant-General
- Service number: 38415
- Unit: Royal Artillery
- Commands: British Forces in Hong Kong; Aldershot District; 6th Armoured Division; 63rd Medium Artillery Regiment
- Conflicts: Second World War
- Awards: Knight Commander of the Order of the British Empire; Companion of the Order of the Bath; Mentioned in Despatches

Lieutenant-General Sir Denis Stuart Scott Rory O'Connor, KBE, CB (2 July 1907 – 18 January 1988) was a senior British Army officer who served as general officer commanding Aldershot District from 1960 to 1961.

== Military career ==
After attending the Royal Military Academy, Woolwich, O'Connor was commissioned into the Royal Artillery in September 1927, and was deployed in India from 1929 to 1935.

O'Connor served in the Second World War, initially as an instructor at the Staff College, Camberley, and then with the 11th Armoured Division. He was appointed commanding officer of 63rd Medium Artillery Regiment in North West Europe in 1944 and was then deployed with the Fourteenth Army to Burma in 1945.

After the war O'Connor became director of plans to the Supreme Allied Commander for South East Asia Command before becoming a brigadier on the general staff of Middle East Command in 1946. After attending the Imperial Defence College in 1950, he was appointed chief instructor at the Royal School of Artillery in 1951 and commander Royal Artillery for 11th Armoured Division in 1953.

O'Connor became director of plans at the War Office in 1955 and general officer commanding 6th Armoured Division in 1957. He was made chief army instructor at the Imperial Defence College in London in 1958 and GOC Aldershot District in 1960. He was appointed Deputy Chief of the Defence Staff in 1962 and commander of British Forces in Hong Kong in 1964. He retired in 1966.

Military offices
Preceded by Roderick McLeod	GOC 6th Armoured Division; 1957–1958	Post disbanded
Preceded by Ronald Bramwell-Davis	GOC Aldershot District; 1960–1961	Succeeded by John Francis Metcalfe
Preceded by Sir Richard Craddock	Commander of British Forces in Hong Kong; 1964–1966	Succeeded by Sir John Worsley
