= John Metcalfe (British Army officer) =

British Army general (1908–1975)

Major-General John Metcalfe CB CBE
- Born: 30 June 1908; Berwick-upon-Tweed, Northumberland, England
- Died: 11 June 1975 (aged 66); New Romney, Kent, England
- Military career
- Allegiance: United Kingdom
- Branch: British Army
- Service years: 1928–1963
- Rank: Major-General
- Service number: 41781
- Units: Queen's Royal Regiment (West Surrey); East Surrey Regiment
- Commands: Aldershot District (1961–1963); 2nd Federation Infantry Brigade (1955–1957); 1st Battalion, East Surrey Regiment (1949–1951); 2nd Battalion, Queen's Royal Regiment (West Surrey) (1944)
- Conflicts: Second World War; Malayan Emergency
- Awards: Companion of the Order of the Bath; Commander of the Order of the British Empire; Mentioned in Despatches

Major-General John Francis Metcalfe, CB, CBE (30 June 1908 – 11 June 1975) was a British Army officer who served in the Second World War and later became General Officer Commanding Aldershot District.

== Military career ==
Educated at Radley College and the Royal Military College, Sandhurst, Metcalfe was commissioned into the Queen's Royal Regiment (West Surrey) in 1928.

By the outbreak of the Second World War in September 1939, Metcalfe was attending the Staff College, Quetta, later becoming an instructor at the college, in 1942. He was appointed commanding officer of the 2nd Battalion, Queen's Royal Regiment in 1944 and brigadier responsible for maintenance at Headquarters Allied Land Forces in South East Asia in 1945.

After the war Metcalfe became colonel in charge of administration for the South Wales District from 1946, then an instructor at the Joint Services Staff College from 1947. He was appointed commanding officer of the 1st Battalion the East Surrey Regiment in 1949 and then became a brigadier on the General Staff at Western Command in 1951. He attended the Imperial Defence College in 1954. He was made commander of the 2nd Federation Infantry Brigade in Malaya during the Malayan Emergency in 1955 and Director of Personnel Administration at the War Office in 1958. He was appointed General Officer Commanding Aldershot District in 1961 and retired in 1963.

Metcalfe was also Colonel of the Queen's Royal Surrey Regiment from 1959 to 1964.

Military offices
Preceded by Sir Denis O'Connor	GOC Aldershot District; 1961–1963	Succeeded by Patrick Man
