= Edward Burke-Gaffney =

British Army general (1900–1981)

Major-General Edward Burke-Gaffney CBE
- Born: 1900
- Died: 1981 (aged 80−81)
- Military career
- Allegiance: United Kingdom
- Branch: British Army
- Service years: 1920–1954
- Rank: Major-General
- Service number: 19140
- Commands: Aldershot District
- Conflicts: World War II

Major-General Edward Sebastian Burke-Gaffney (1900–1981) was a British Army officer who commanded Aldershot District.

== Military career ==
Burke-Gaffney was commissioned into the Royal Artillery in 1920. In 1933 he became the Officer Commanding the Gentleman Cadets at the Royal Military Academy, Woolwich. He served in World War II as a staff officer responsible for co-ordination and supply at Army Headquarters in India. After the War became a brigadier at Scottish Command. He was appointed General Officer Commanding Aldershot District in 1953 and retired in 1954.

Military offices
| Preceded by John Eldridge | GOC Aldershot District; 1953−1954 | Succeeded by Douglas Campbell |
