= Kenneth McLean =

British Army general

Lieutenant-General Sir Kenneth McLean KCB KBE
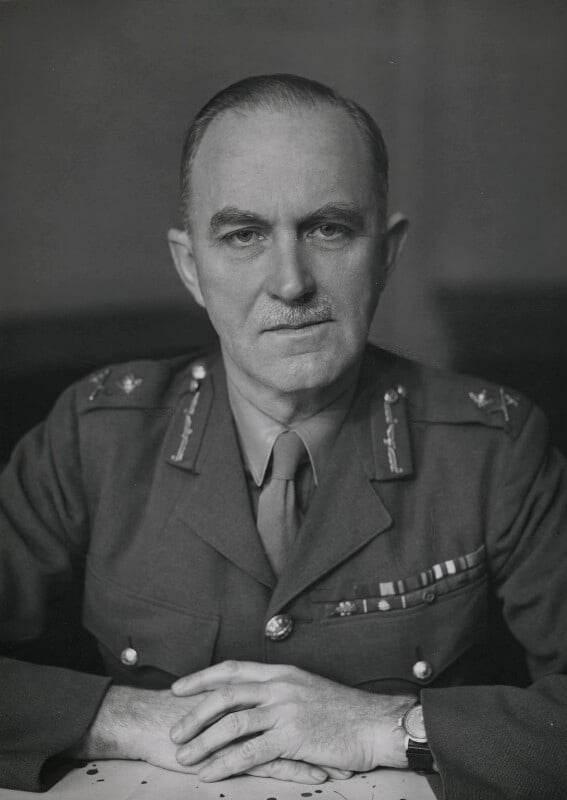
- McLean in 1949
- Born: 11 December 1896; Corstorphine, Midlothian, Scotland
- Died: 5 June 1987 (aged 90); Galashiels, Selkirkshire, Scotland
- Military career
- Allegiance: United Kingdom
- Branch: British Army
- Service years: 1914–1954
- Rank: Lieutenant-General
- Service number: 15991
- Unit: Royal Engineers
- Conflicts: First World War; Anglo-Irish War; Second World War
- Awards: Knight Commander of the Order of the Bath; Knight Commander of the Order of the British Empire; Mentioned in Despatches

Lieutenant-General Sir Kenneth Graeme McLean, KCB, KBE (11 December 1896 – 5 June 1987) was a senior British Army officer who served as Military Secretary from 1949 to 1951.

== Military career ==
McLean served in the ranks during the First World War and was commissioned into the Royal Engineers in 1918. After the war he served in Ireland from 1919 and then with King George's Own Bengal Sappers and Miners in India from 1923. He went to the Staff College in Quetta in 1930 and was then a General Staff Officer at Army Headquarters, India, from 1932. He was appointed Assistant Secretary for the Committee of Imperial Defence in 1938.

McLean served in the Second World War in France and Germany. Promoted to colonel on 18 October 1940, with seniority backdated to 1 January 1939, in 1943 he became Chief Operations Officer for the 21st Army Group and, in this capacity, was involved in the planning of Operation Overlord. He was promoted to the acting rank of major-general on 26 April 1945, shortly before the end of the war in Europe.

After the war McLean became Deputy Adjutant General at General Headquarters Far East Land Forces and then at General Headquarters Middle East Land Forces. He was made Vice Adjutant General at the War Office in 1947 and chief of staff at the Control Commission in Germany and Deputy Military Governor for the British Zone in Germany in 1949. He was made Military Secretary in 1949 and Chief Staff Officer at the Ministry of Defence in 1951. McLean led the Committee of Inquiry into the conduct of the Army during the campaign against the Mau-Mau in Kenya and found that the troops had shown "a high sense of responsibility and application to duty" but also reported that "two instances of serious misconduct had occurred." He retired in 1954.

In retirement McLean was a member of the Central Advisory Council on Education, the authors of the Crowther Report: Fifteen to Eighteen, the publication that eventually led, in 1972, to the raising of the school leaving age to 16. He also raised money for the repair of St Paul's Cathedral.

Military offices
Preceded by Sir Robert Mansergh	Military Secretary; 1949–1951	Succeeded by Sir Euan Miller
