= Achalader =

Coordinates: 56.594150°N 3.423271°W

Achalader: Scottish Gaelic: Achadh Chaladair
- Location within Perth and Kinross
- OS grid reference: NO127456
- Council area: Perth and Kinross
- Lieutenancy area: Perth and Kinross
- Country: Scotland
- Sovereign state: United Kingdom
- Post town: BLAIRGOWRIE
- Postcode district: PH10
- Dialling code: 01250
- Police: Scotland
- Fire: Scottish
- Ambulance: Scottish
- UK Parliament: Angus and Perthshire Glens
- Scottish Parliament: Perth Mid Scotland and Fife

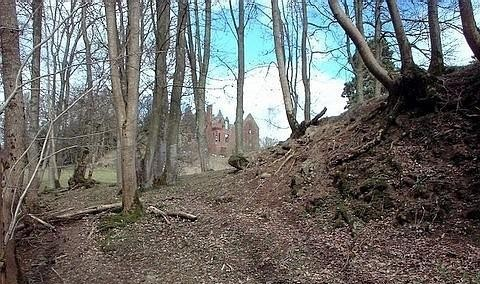
The ruins of Achalader House.

Achalader (Scottish Gaelic: Achadh Chaladair) is a settlement in the council area of Perth and Kinross, Scotland.

Achalader is situated 3 miles (5 kilometres) west of Blairgowrie, north of the A923 road.
