= Warren Melville Anderson =

Australian Army general

Warren Anderson
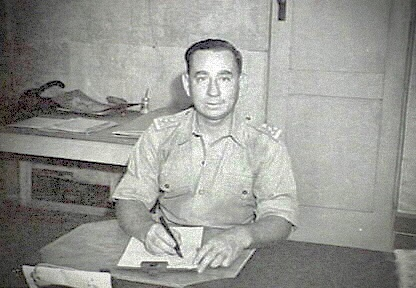
- Anderson, then a brigadier, at Northern Territory Force HQ in 1944
- Born: 31 August 1894; Singleton, New South Wales
- Died: 10 February 1973 (aged 78); Darling Point, New South Wales
- Education: Royal Military College, Duntroon
- Spouse: Violet Clark (m. 1928)
- Military career
- Allegiance: Australia
- Branch: Australian Army
- Service years: 1914–1951
- Rank: Major General
- Service number: VX60298
- Conflicts: First World War; Second World War
- Awards: Commander of the Order of the British Empire; Distinguished Service Order; Mentioned in Despatches (2)

Major General Warren Melville Anderson CBE, DSO (31 August 1894 – 10 February 1973) was a general officer in the Australian Army who served in both the First and Second World Wars.

== Early life ==
The eldest son of Marsham Ambrose Anderson, Warren was born in Singleton, New South Wales, on 31 August 1894.

== Military career ==
Anderson was educated at the Royal Military College, Duntroon, and commissioned as a lieutenant on 3 November 1914 in B Squadron, 6th Light Horse Regiment.

=== First World War ===
Following the outbreak of the First World War, Anderson and his squadron sailed from Sydney on board HMAT (A29) Suevic on 21 December 1914, and arrived in Egypt on 1 February 1915. After serving as infantry in the Gallipoli Campaign between May and December 1915, the light horsemen were stationed in Egypt as part of the ANZAC Mounted Division. They played an important role in the advance into Palestine, taking part in several major actions up until the Armistice of 30 October 1918. In the course of the war Anderson was advanced to the acting rank of captain and then major, serving as brigade major in the 3rd Light Horse Brigade, part of the Australian Mounted Division. Anderson received two Mentions in Despatches (in January 1918 and January 1919), and was awarded the Distinguished Service Order in the 1919 New Year Honours.

=== Inter-war years ===
From February 1920 Anderson served as a general staff officer, 3rd grade (GSO3) in the 6th Military District, receiving promotion to captain on 30 September, and subsequently serving as a staff officer in the 1st Cavalry Division from May 1921, and then in the 2nd Division from August 1922. Between December 1922 and December 1924 he served as the Brigade Major of the 1st Infantry Brigade, before attending the Staff College, Quetta until February 1927. He then served in the Inspector General's Branch until May 1928, then as a general staff officer in charge of Training, based at Army Headquarters until January 1932. He served as brigade major in the 3rd Cavalry Brigade between February and August 1932, finally receiving promotion to the rank of major on 1 September 1932. He then served as a temporary staff officer in the 2nd Cavalry Division, before becoming brigade major in the 5th and then the 6th Cavalry Brigades. In November 1936 Anderson was appointed to the staff of the 1st Cavalry Division, and was promoted to lieutenant colonel on 3 July 1938.

=== Second World War ===
Between March 1939 and January 1940 Anderson served on exchange in the Meerut district of India, returning to Australia on 8 January 1940 to join the staff of the 4th Division. In April 1940 he was appointed director of staff duties, with the rank of temporary colonel. On 1 July 1941 he was promoted to colonel and transferred to the Australian Armoured Corps, part of the Second Australian Imperial Force, serving as assistant adjutant and quartermaster-general of the 1st Armoured Division until January 1942. After a brief term as director of military training in early 1942, he returned to staff duties with the rank of brigadier, serving with III Corps until June 1943, Second Army until August 1943, then at the Advanced Land HQ at St Lucia, Queensland, until January 1944. Anderson was on the staff of the Northern Territory Force until August 1944, with two brief periods as acting general officer commanding in February/March and August. From September 1944 until the end of the war in August 1945 he was attached as brigadier in charge of administration to the Eighth United States Army.

=== Post-war ===
Anderson was appointed a Commander of the Order of the British Empire in November 1946, and from 1947 he served as adjutant-general of the Australian Military Forces and Second Member of the Military Board until he retired with the rank of major general in 1951.

== Personal life ==
Anderson married Violet Clark in 1928. He died at his home in Darling Point, New South Wales on 10 February 1973.
