= Charles Chadwyck-Healey =

British lawyer and baronet

Sir Charles Edward Heley Chadwyck-Healey, 1st Baronet KCB KC DL JP (26 August 1845 – 5 October 1919) was a British lawyer and baronet.

== Background ==
He was born Charles Healey, the only son of Edward Charles Healey. After his father's death, he succeeded him in the control of the magazine The Engineer. Chadwyck-Healey was called to the bar by Lincoln's Inn in 1872, was appointed a Queen's Counsel in 1891 and became a bencher four years later.

== Career ==
In 1903, Chadwyck-Healey was nominated chairman of the Admiralty Volunteers Committee, an office he held until 1914. Subsequently, he was member of the Admiralty Transport Arbitration Board, for which he was created a baronet, of Wyphurst, in the County of Surrey on 6 May 1919. Chadwyck-Healey served as High Sheriff of Somerset in 1911 and served in the county as a Deputy Lieutenant as well as Justice of the Peace, exercising the latter post also in the county of Surrey. He was a county alderman for Somerset and sat in its Quarter Sessions.

Chadwyck-Healey was an honorary captain in the Royal Navy Reserve and commanded the hospital ship Queen Alexandra. In 1905, he was appointed to the Royal Commission on the Care and Control of the Feeble Minded and was appointed a Companion of the Order of the Bath. After his resignation four years later, he was promoted to Knight Commander. Chadwyck-Healey served as chancellor first of the Diocese of Salisbury, then of Bath and Wells and lastly of Exeter. He was a Fellow of the Society of Antiquaries.

== Family ==
On 6 February 1872, he married firstly Rosa Close, daughter of John Close, and had by her a son. She died in 1880 and on 17 May 1884 Chadwyck-Healey married Frances Katharine Wait, eldest daughter of William Killigrew Wait. By his second wife, he had two further sons and a daughter. His daughter married Edward Williams, an officer of the British Army, in 1925. Chadwyck-Healey died in 1919 and was succeeded in the baronetcy by his eldest son Gerald.

Honorary titles
Preceded by Henry Herbert Wills	High Sheriff of Somerset; 1911	Succeeded by William Bucknell Broadmead
Baronetage of the United Kingdom
New creation	Baronet (of Wyphurst); May – Oct 1919	Succeeded by Gerald Chadwyck-Healey
