= Chadwyck-Healey baronets =

Baronetcy in the Baronetage of the United Kingdom

The Chadwyck-Healey Baronetcy, of Wyphurst in the parish of Cranleigh in the County of Surrey and of New Place in the Parish of Luccombe in the County of Somerset, is a title in the Baronetage of the United Kingdom. It was created on 6 May 1919 for the lawyer Charles Chadwyck-Healey. He died in the same year and his eldest son inherited the baronetcy, becoming the second Baronet. His eldest son, the third Baronet, died childless in 1979 and was in his turn succeeded by his younger brother, the fourth Baronet. He was a Lieutenant Colonel of the Royal Artillery. As of 2010, the baronetcy is held by the fourth Baronet's son, who succeeded in 1986.

The television presenter Cherry Healey is descended from the 4th Baronet, her grandfather.

== Chadwyck-Healey baronets, of Wyphurst and New Place (1919) ==
- Sir Charles Edward Heley Chadwyck-Healey, 1st Baronet (1845–1919)
- Sir Gerald Edward Chadwyck-Healey, 2nd Baronet CBE, DL (16 May 1873 – 2 February 1955). Chadwyck-Healey was a soldier. The son of Sir Charles Chadwyck-Healey, 1st Baronet, and Rosa Close, he was educated at Eton College, Berkshire and Trinity College, Oxford, where he graduated with a Bachelor of Arts in 1896 and a Master of Arts in 1900. Chadwyck-Healey served in the Royal Naval Volunteer Reserve, reaching the rank of Lieutenant. He fought in the First World War and was made a Commander of the Order of the Crown of Italy and a Commander of the Order of the British Empire in 1919. In the same year, he succeeded to his father's baronetcy. Chadwyck-Healey was further a Deputy Lieutenant for Ayrshire. On 2 March 1897, he married Mary Verena Watson, daughter of George Arthur Watson. They had three children: Sir Edward Randal Chadwyck-Healey, 3rd Baronet (1898–1979); Rosa Mary Philippa Chadwyck-Healey (1907–1997), married Cyril George Holland-Martin, son of Robert Martin Holland-Martin on 21 July 1933; Lieutenant-Colonel Sir Charles Arthur Chadwyck-Healey, 4th Baronet (1910–1986).
- Sir Edward Randal Chadwyck-Healey, 3rd Baronet (1898–1979)
- Sir Charles Arthur Chadwyck-Healey, 4th Baronet (1910–1986)
- Sir Charles Edward Chadwyck-Healey, 5th Baronet (born 1940), educated Eton College 1953–1958, Trinity College, Oxford, Honours degree in Geography 1958–1961. Founder of Chadwyck-Healey group of academic publishing companies 1973 which were sold to Bell & Howell Inc (now ProQuest) in 1999. Also founded Micropatent Inc and Geosure Inc, both sold successfully in 1997 and 1999. Member of the Marshall Aid Commemoration Commission in the 1990s; Honorary Fellow of Trinity College, Oxford, High Sheriff of Cambridgeshire 2004–2005, Deputy Lieutenant of Cambridgeshire 2004-, chairman, Wildlife Trust of Bedfordshire, Cambridgeshire and Northamptonshire, 2009–2015. Author of A Walk along Hadrian’s Wall, Bassingbourn, Penchant Press, 2007, Publishing for Libraries at the Dawn of the Digital Age, London, Bloomsbury Academic, 2020. Donor to Cambridge University Library of the Liberation Collection 1944-1946 and to the Bodleian Library, University of Oxford, the Chadwyck-Healey Collection of Photo Books. Creator of the exhibition Machu Picchu and the camera from 2002 to 2012 at the Oxford Museum of Natural History, the Cambridge Museum of Archeology and Anthropology, the British Museum, the Sainsbury Centre, University of East Anglia, the Royal Geographical Society.

The heir apparent is Edward Alexander Chadwyck-Healey (born 1972).
