= Aldershot Command =

Former British Army command

- Active: 1881–1941
- Country: United Kingdom
- Branch: British Army
- Type: Command
- Garrison/HQ: Aldershot

Aldershot Command was a Home Command of the British Army.

== History ==
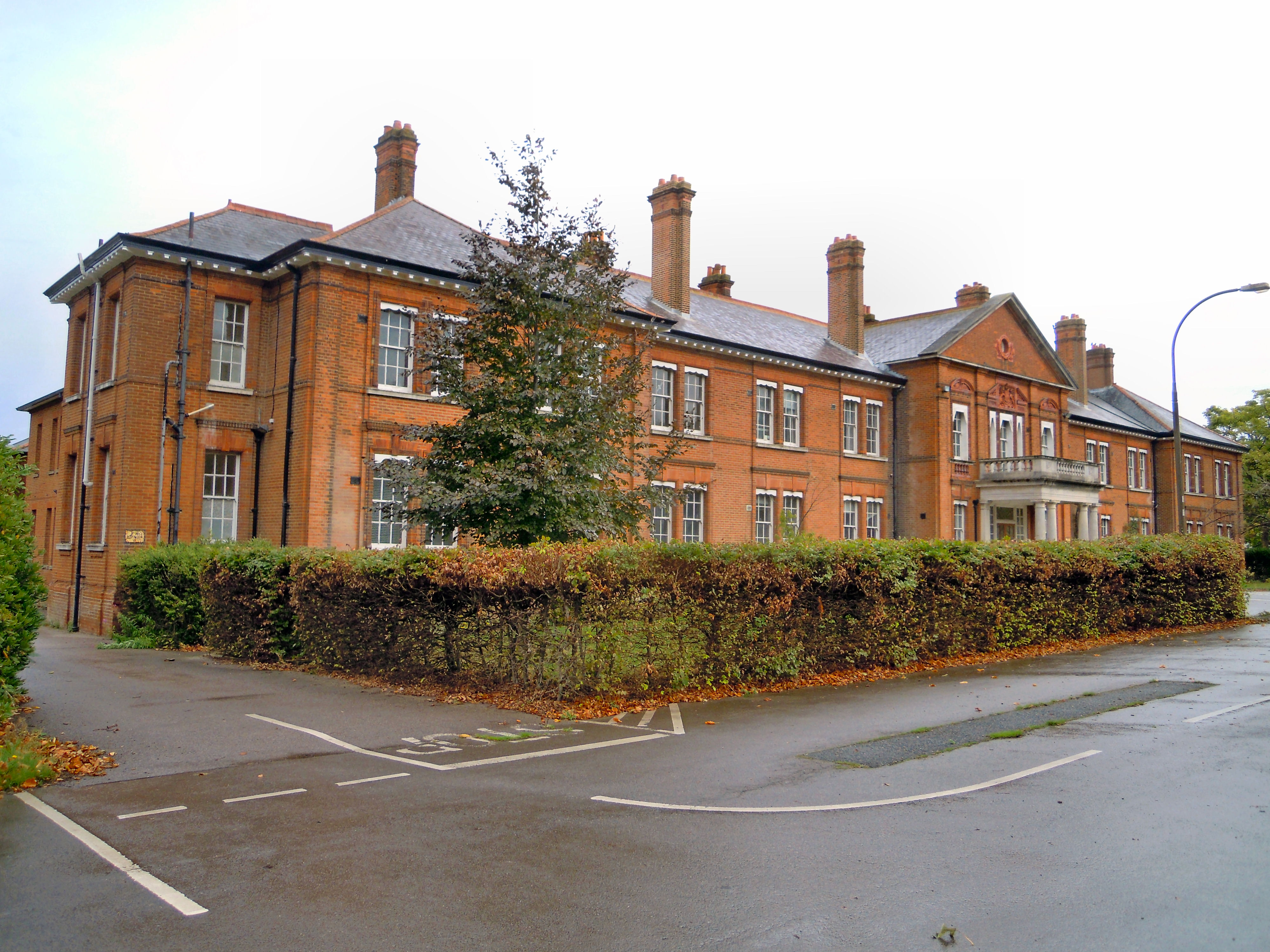
Military Headquarters Building, in use 1895 to 1995 (when it was handed over to 4th Division)

After the success of the Chobham Manoeuvres of 1853, reformers of the British Army decided to create a permanent training camp at Aldershot. To begin the preliminary work a small party of NCOs and men of the Royal Engineers arrived in November 1853 on the site of the present Princes Gardens in the town making them the first soldiers to arrive in Aldershot. These engineers were responsible for surveying and making the preliminary arrangements for The Camp at Aldershot. The Camp was established at Aldershot in 1854 on the recommendation of the commander-in-chief, Viscount Hardinge. During the Crimean War, regiments of Militia embodied for home defence were housed at the camp, and the Brigade of Guards used it for summer training, and were reviewed by Queen Victoria.

After the Crimean War, a division of Regular troops was permanently based at Aldershot, and ‘the division at Aldershot’ (including artillery at Christchurch, Hampshire, and cavalry at Hounslow, Middlesex), became one of the most important home commands of the British Army.

In January 1876 a ‘Mobilization Scheme for the forces in Great Britain and Ireland’ was published, with the ‘Active Army’ divided into eight army corps based on the major Commands and Districts. 2nd Corps was to be formed within Aldershot Command, based at Aldershot. This scheme disappeared in 1881, when the districts were retitled ‘District Commands’. In 1898 (when Queen Victoria's son, the Duke of Connaught, was general officer commanding (GOC)) Aldershot Command was ranked I on the list. A purpose-built command headquarters was completed in 1895.

The 1901 Army Estimates introduced by St John Brodrick allowed for six army corps based on six regional commands. As outlined in a paper published in 1903, I Corps was to be formed in a reconstituted Aldershot Command, with HQ at Aldershot. General Sir Redvers Buller was appointed acting general officer commanding-in-chief (GOCinC) of I Corps in April 1903.

Under Army Order No. 28 of 1907 the Home Commands were reorganised to provide a basis for the British Expeditionary Force (BEF).

=== Composition of Aldershot Command 1907 ===
The composition was as follows:

1st Cavalry Brigade (Brig-Gen Hon Julian Byng)

1st Division (Maj-Gen James Grierson)

- 1st Brigade Aldershot
- 2nd Brigade Blackdown
- 3rd Brigade Bordon
- Three Field Artillery Brigades (each of three batteries) Royal Field Artillery
- One Field Artillery (Howitzer) Brigade RFA
- Two Field Companies Royal Engineers
- Two Divisional Telegraph Companies RE

2nd Division (Maj-Gen Bruce Hamilton)

- 4th (Guards) Brigade London
- 5th Brigade Aldershot
- 6th Brigade Aldershot
- Three Field Artillery Brigades RFA
- Two Field Companies RE

Army Troops

- 1st & 2nd Air Line Companies, RE
- 1st & 2nd Cable Telegraph Companies RE
- 1st & 2nd Wireless Telegraph Companies RE
- 1st & 2nd Balloon Companies RE
- 1st & 3rd Bridging Train RE

== First World War ==
When the BEF was sent to France on the outbreak of the First World War in August 1914, Aldershot Command provided the basis for I Corps under Lieutenant-general Sir Douglas Haig. The Territorial Force and Special Reserve then took over home defence, with the assembly of Central Force beginning on 18 August 1914. First Army of Central Force was headquartered at Aldershot, with the Highland Division (later 51st (Highland) Division) and Highland Mounted Brigade of the TF under command. For the first two years of the war, command at Aldershot was divided between the major-general, administration (Major-general Alexander Hamilton-Gordon) and the commander of Aldershot Training Centre (General Sir Archibald Hunter). Aldershot Command was reinstated in 1916 under Hunter.

== Second World War ==
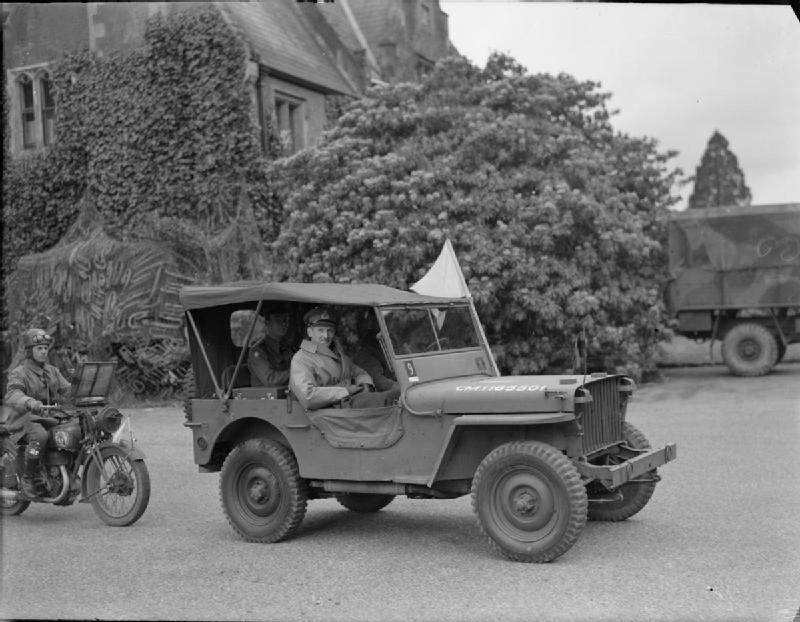
Promoted to GOC-in-C South Eastern Army on 19 November 1941, Lieutenant-General Bernard Montgomery is seated in a jeep during one of his military exercises.

In August 1939 its geographical area encompassed parts of the following four counties: Berkshire, Hampshire, Surrey, and Sussex. The exact boundaries were as follows: "From the River Loddon where crossed by the Southern Railway at Loddon Bridge (south-east of Reading) along the railway through Wokingham, Bracknell and Ascot to Sunningdale–thence the eastern boundaries of the parishes of Chobham and Horsell to the railway at Woking–thence southward along the railway (omitting the portions of the parishes of Guildford and Artington to the west of the railway and the three small portions of Sussex lying to the north of the railway) to Liss–thence northward along the road leading to Reading, through Selborne, Alton and Odiham (but inclusive of the portions of the parishes of Alton and Chawton lying west of that road)–to Swallowfield–thence along the River Loddon to Loddon Bridge."

On the outbreak of the war in September 1939, the General Officer Commanding Aldershot Command was Lieutenant-general Sir John Dill. Regular troops in the command included the 1st Infantry Division and 2nd Infantry Division. A similar process to August 1914 was repeated when Dill became GOC I Corps in the new British Expeditionary Force which was despatched to France. In the event of an invasion of the UK, it was intended that each command could form the basis for a field army. However, on the outbreak of the war, Aldershot Command was used to form I Corps and then became responsible for providing drafts for British Expeditionary Force.

Unlike the other Home Commands, Aldershot had no Coast divisions or other defence forces under its command, and was solely responsible for providing drafts and reserve formations.

In September 1939 there were five companies of the Royal Army Medical Corps in the command, the 1st and 2nd Companies, and the A, B, and C Companies (Depot). The Royal Army Ordnance Corps had Nos 1 and 5 Sections in the Command; the Royal Army Pay Corps had a Detachment at Aldershot and a detachment at Woking; and the Royal Army Veterinary Corps had a detachment at Camberley. The Army Tank Brigade was headquartered at Aldershot with the 4th, 7th, and 8th Battalions of the Royal Tank Regiment, later, in 1940, to become 4th, 7th and 8th Royal Tank Regiments.

Following defeat during the Battle of France, the Army reorganised its forces based in the UK. For Aldershot Command, this resulted in being downgraded into Aldershot Area within the new South Eastern Command on 15 February 1941. The new formation was formed by the splitting of Eastern Command and absorbing Aldershot's geographical area. South Eastern Command ceased to exist at the end of 1944, and Aldershot was transferred to Southern Command, without its own GOC.

== Post-War ==
GOCs were appointed to Aldershot District from 1944 to 1967, when it disappeared in the reorganisation that led to Southern Command being redesignated GHQ UK Land Forces. From 1968, the HQ of South East District was at Aldershot; it was renamed Southern District in 1992, and HQ 4th Division in 1995.

== General Officers Commanding-in-Chief ==
Appointments as General Officers Commanding (GOC) and General Officers Commanding-in-Chief (GOC-in-C) have included:

The division at Aldershot

- 1857 Lieutenant General Sir William Knollys
- 1 July 1860 Lieutenant General Sir John Pennefather
- 1 October 1865 Lieutenant General Sir James Scarlett
- 1 November 1870 General Sir James Grant
- 14 April 1875 General Sir Thomas Steele

Aldershot District Command

- 1 July 1880 General Sir Daniel Lysons
- 1 August 1883 Lieutenant General Sir Archibald Alison
- 1 January 1889 Lieutenant General Sir Evelyn Wood VC
- 9 October 1893 (GOC-in-C) General the Duke of Connaught
- 9 October 1898 General Sir Redvers Buller VC
  - temporary appointments while Buller commanded in South Africa:
  - 9 October 1899 Lieutenant General Thomas Kelly-Kenny CB
  - 15 December 1899 General Alexander Moore
  - 17 September 1900 Lieutenant General Sir William Butler KCB

Lieutenant-general Commanding Troops at Aldershot, and 1st Army Corps

- 10 January 1901 General Sir Redvers Buller VC GCB KCMG (on his arrival back from South Africa)
  - 25 October 1901 Lieutenant General Sir Henry Hildyard, KCB (temporary when Buller was dismissed, pending the return from South Africa of French)
- 15 September 1902 Lieutenant General Sir John French

In 1905 title changed to GOC-in-C.
In 1907 title changed to Aldershot Corps.
In 1908 became Aldershot Command again.

Aldershot Command

- 1 December 1907 Lieutenant General Sir Horace Smith-Dorrien
- 1 March 1912 Lieutenant General Sir Douglas Haig

GOC and Major General Administration, Aldershot Command

- 1914-16 Major General Alexander Hamilton-Gordon

GOC Aldershot Training Centre

- 1914-16 General Sir Archibald Hunter

Aldershot Command

- April 1916 General Sir Archibald Hunter
- 1 October 1917 General Sir Archibald Murray
- 15 November 1919 General Lord Rawlinson
- 2 November 1920 General The Earl of Cavan
- 1922 to 1923 Lieutenant General Sir Thomas Morland
- 1 March 1923 Lieutenant General Sir Philip Chetwode
- 1 March 1927 Lieutenant General Sir David Campbell
- 30 June 1931 Lieutenant General Sir Charles Harington
- 12 October 1933 Lieutenant General Sir Francis Gathorne-Hardy
- 12 October 1937 Lieutenant General Sir John Dill
- 3 September 1939 to 1940 Lieutenant General Sir Charles Broad
- 7 March 1940 Lieutenant General Michael Barker
- 21 May 1940 Major General Geoffrey Raikes
- 25 June 1940 Major General Dudley Johnson VC

South Eastern Command
Commanders included:

- 15 February 1941 Lieutenant General Sir Bernard Paget
- 25 December 1941 Lieutenant General Sir Bernard Montgomery
- 7 August 1942 Lieutenant General Sir John Swayne
- 19 March 1944 Lieutenant General Sir Edmond Schreiber
- 25 September 1944 Lieutenant General Eric Miles

Aldershot District

- September 1944 Major General Charles Norman
- December 1944 Major General Henry Curtis
- September 1945 Major General Robert Ross
- September 1946 Major General Sir Noel Holmes
- November 1946 Major General Joseph Baillon
- November 1948 Major General William Dimoline
- 1 September 1951 Major General John Eldridge
- 1953 Major General Edward Burke-Gaffney
- 8 February 1954 Major General Sir Douglas Campbell
- 7 February 1956 Major General Ronald Bramwell-Davis
- 7 February 1960 Major General Sir Denis O’Connor
- 8 November 1961 Major General John Francis Metcalfe
- 7 November 1963 Major General Patrick Man
- 4 July 1966 Major General Charles Stainforth
