= Noel Holmes =

British Army officer and tennis player

Major-General Sir Noel Holmes KBE CB MC
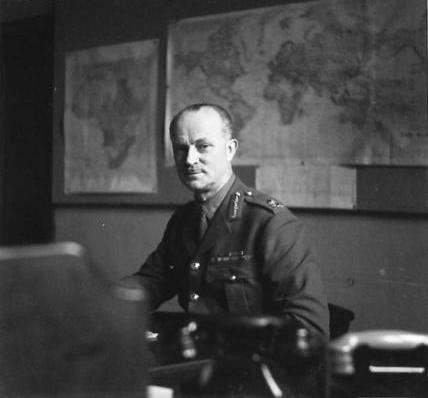
- Holmes in 1944
- Born: 25 December 1891; Galway, Ireland
- Died: 24 December 1982 (aged 90)
- Military career
- Allegiance: United Kingdom
- Branch: British Army
- Service years: 1912–1946
- Rank: Major-General
- Service number: 4842
- Units: Royal Irish Regiment; East Yorkshire Regiment
- Commands: Aldershot District (1946); 1st Battalion, East Yorkshire Regiment (1937–39)
- Conflicts: First World War; Second World War
- Awards: Knight Commander of the Order of the British Empire; Companion of the Order of the Bath; Military Cross; Commander of the Legion of Merit (United States); Officer of the Legion of Honour (France); Croix de Guerre (France)

Major-General Sir Noel Galway Holmes, KBE, CB, MC (25 December 1891 – 24 December 1982) was a senior British Army officer during the Second World War and a Davis Cup tennis player for Ireland in 1930.

== Military career ==
Born in Galway, Ireland, on 25 December 1891, Holmes was educated at Bedford School. He joined the Royal Irish Regiment in 1912 and served in India between 1912 and 1914. During the First World War he served in France, winning the Military Cross in 1917. He served in Upper Silesia between 1921 and 1922. In 1922 he joined the East Yorkshire Regiment and, after attending the Staff College, Camberley from 1926 to 1927, served in India from 1933 to 1937.

During the Second World War, Holmes was Director of Movements at the War Office, from 1939 to 1943. He attended the conferences of allied war leaders in Casablanca, Washington, D.C., Quebec City, Cairo, Tehran, Yalta and Potsdam. He was Deputy Quartermaster General at the War Office from 1943 to 1946 and, briefly, General Officer Commanding Aldershot Command from September to November 1946.

Holmes was invested as a Commander of the Order of the British Empire in 1940, a Companion of the Order of the Bath in 1943, and a Knight Commander of the Order of the British Empire in 1946. He was also made a Commander of the US Legion of Merit, an Officer of the French Legion of Honour and received the Croix de Guerre.

== Personal life ==
Holmes married Mary Clifford, daughter of Sir Hugh Clifford, on 19 June 1920 and they had two children. He retired from the British Army in 1946 and died on 24 December 1982.

== Bibliography ==
- Smart, Nick (2005). Biographical Dictionary of British Generals of the Second World War. Barnsley: Pen and Sword Books. ISBN 1844150496.

Military offices
Preceded by Robert Ross	GOC Aldershot District; September–November 1946	Succeeded by Joseph Baillon
